= Big Snow Mountain (British Columbia) =

Mountain in Western Canada

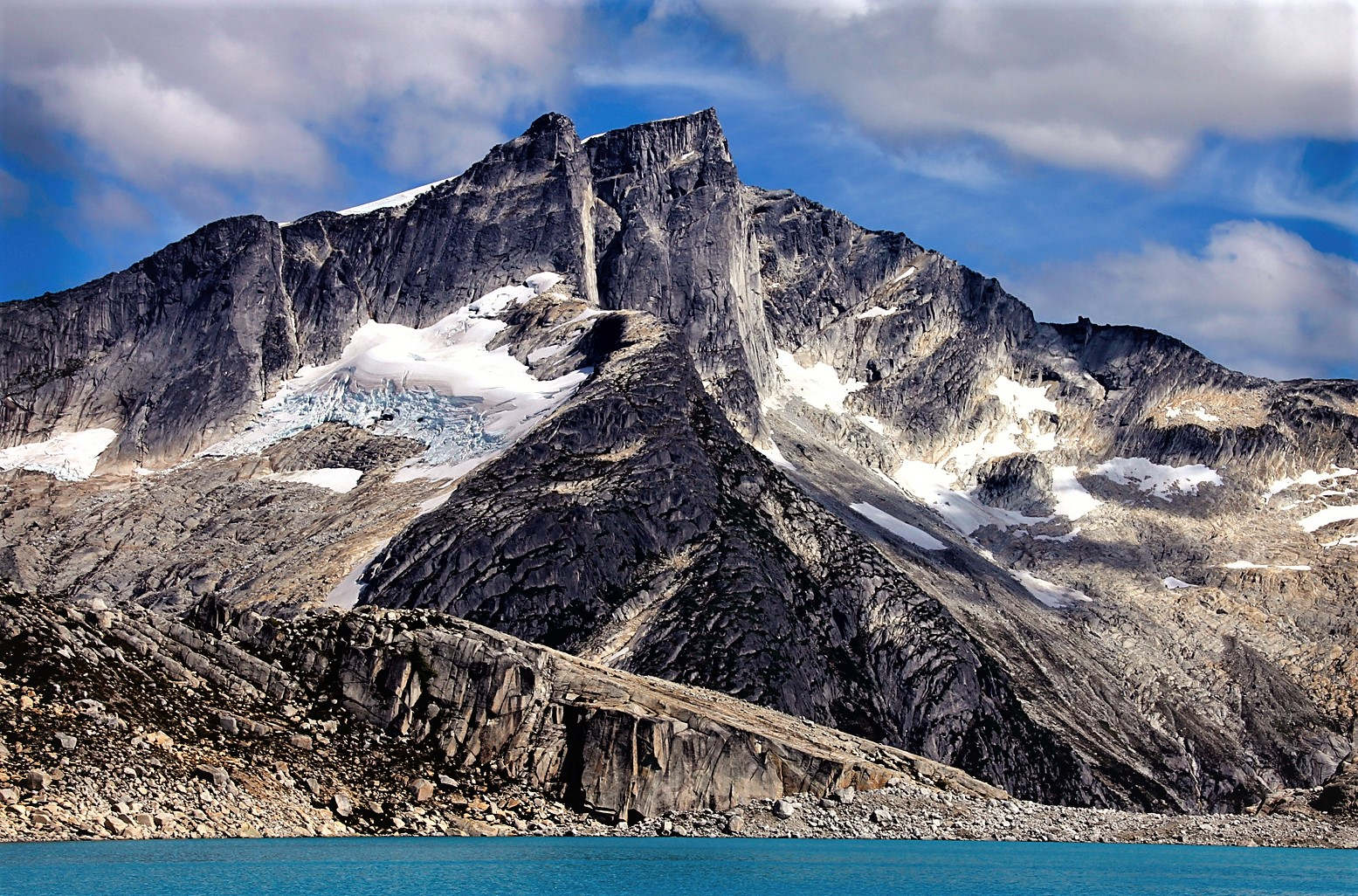
- Southwest aspect

Highest point
- Elevation: 2,357 m (7,733 ft)
- Prominence: 1,196 m (3,924 ft)
- Parent peak: Mount Saugstad (2,908 m)
- Isolation: 8.2 km (5.1 mi)
- Listing: Mountains of British Columbia
- Coordinates: 52°14′17″N 126°41′15″W

Geography
- Location within British Columbia Location within Canada
- Interactive map of Big Snow Mountain
- Country: Canada
- Province: British Columbia
- District: Range 3 Coast Land District
- Parent range: Coast Mountains
- Topo map: NTS 93D2 South Bentinck Arm

Big Snow Mountain is a 2,357-metre (7,733-foot) mountain summit located in British Columbia, Canada.

== Description ==
Big Snow Mountain is a glaciated peak situated in the Coast Mountains, in a remote wilderness area that few visit. Big Snow is set 16 km (9.9 mi) south-southeast of Bella Coola and 430 km (270 mi) northwest of Vancouver. Precipitation runoff and glacier meltwater from Big Snow drains to Thorsen Creek → Bella Coola River → North Bentinck Arm, and to South Bentinck Arm via Brynildsen Creek → Smitley River → Noeick River. Topographic relief is significant as the summit rises 1,550 meters (5,085 feet) above Brynildsen Creek in 2.5 kilometers (1.55 mile). The mountain was named by a 1951 climbing party, and the landform's toponym was officially adopted April 15, 1984, by the Geographical Names Board of Canada.

== Climate ==
Based on the Köppen climate classification, Big Snow Mountain is located in the marine west coast climate zone of western North America. Most weather fronts originate in the Pacific Ocean, and travel east toward the Coast Mountains where they are forced upward by the range (Orographic lift), causing them to drop their moisture in the form of rain or snowfall. As a result, the Coast Mountains experience high precipitation, especially during the winter months in the form of snowfall. Temperatures can drop below −20 °C with wind chill factors below −30 °C. This climate supports glaciers on the north, east and west slopes of Big Snow.

== Gallery ==
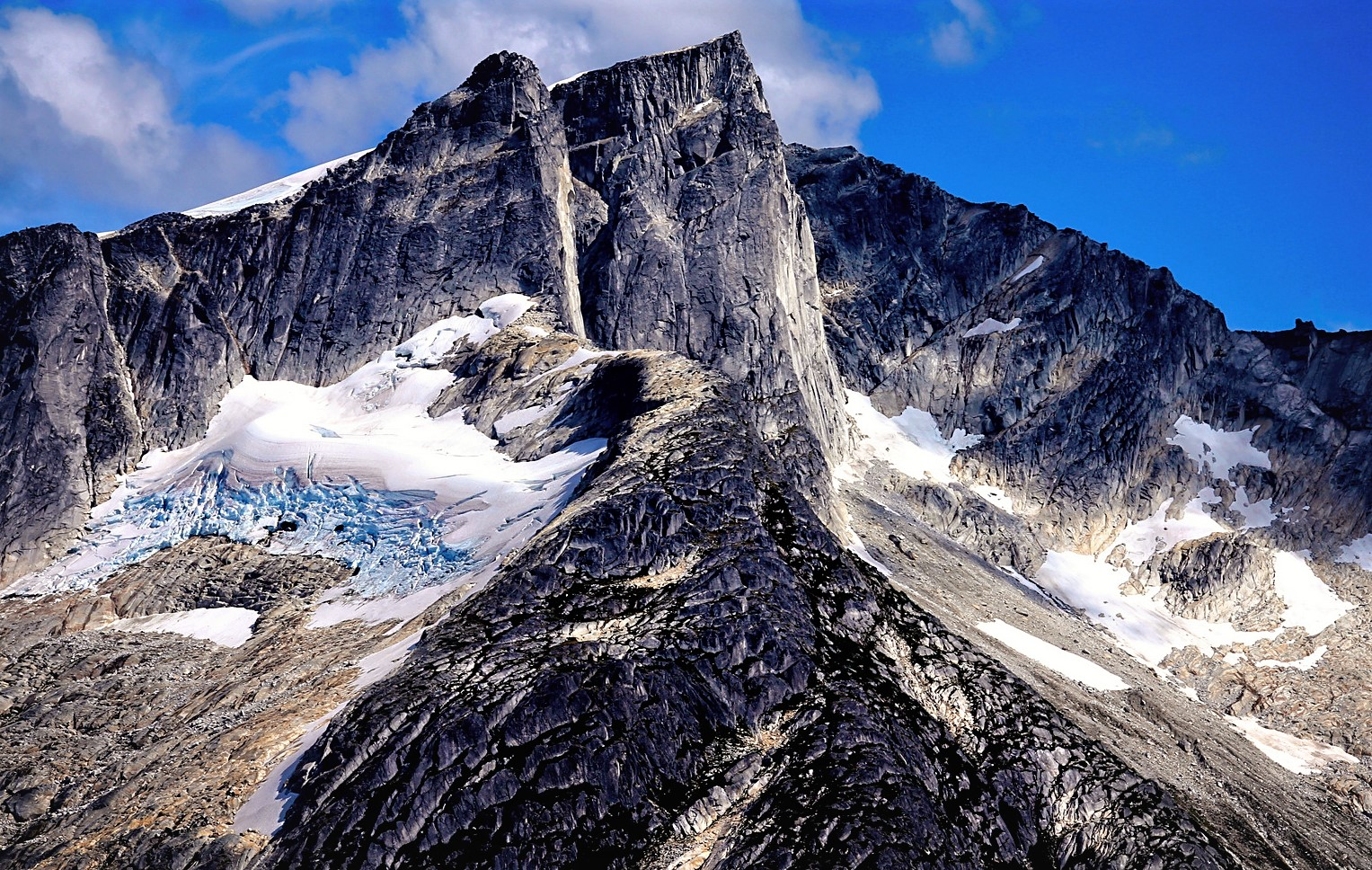
Southwest aspect

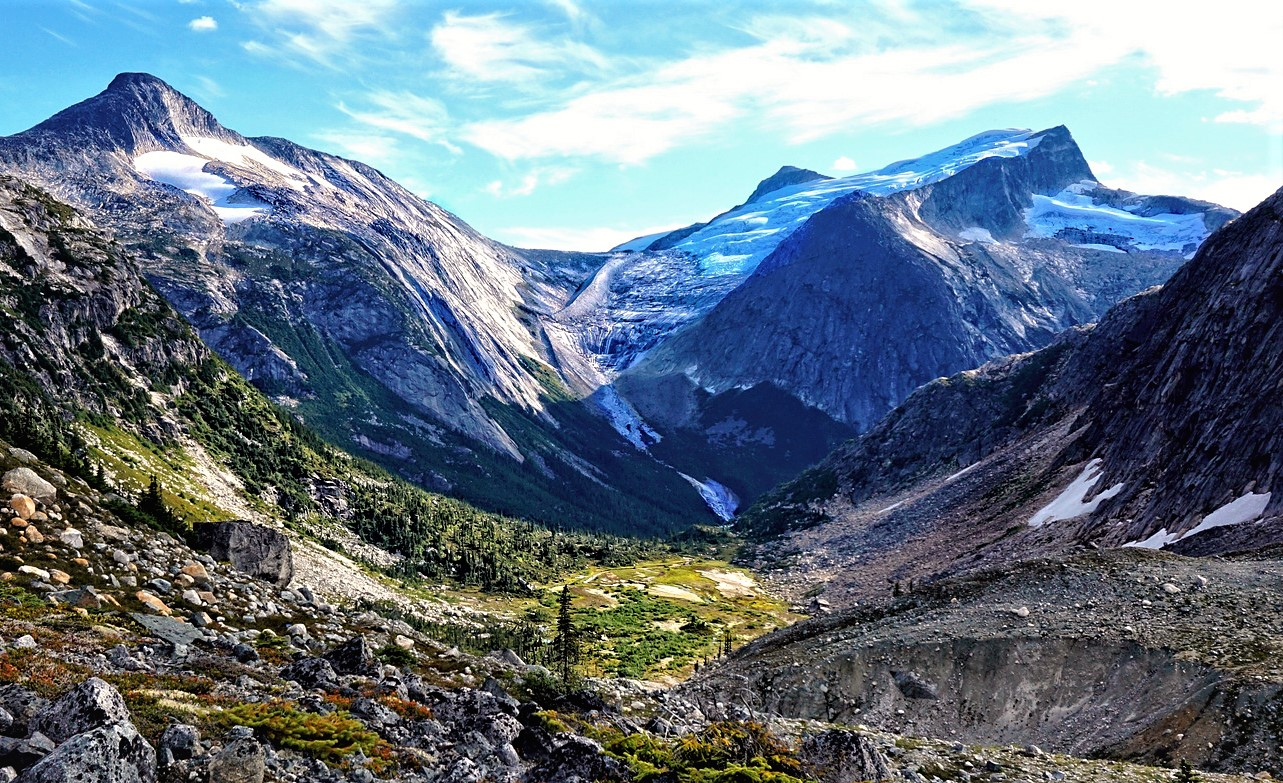
Big Snow (right)

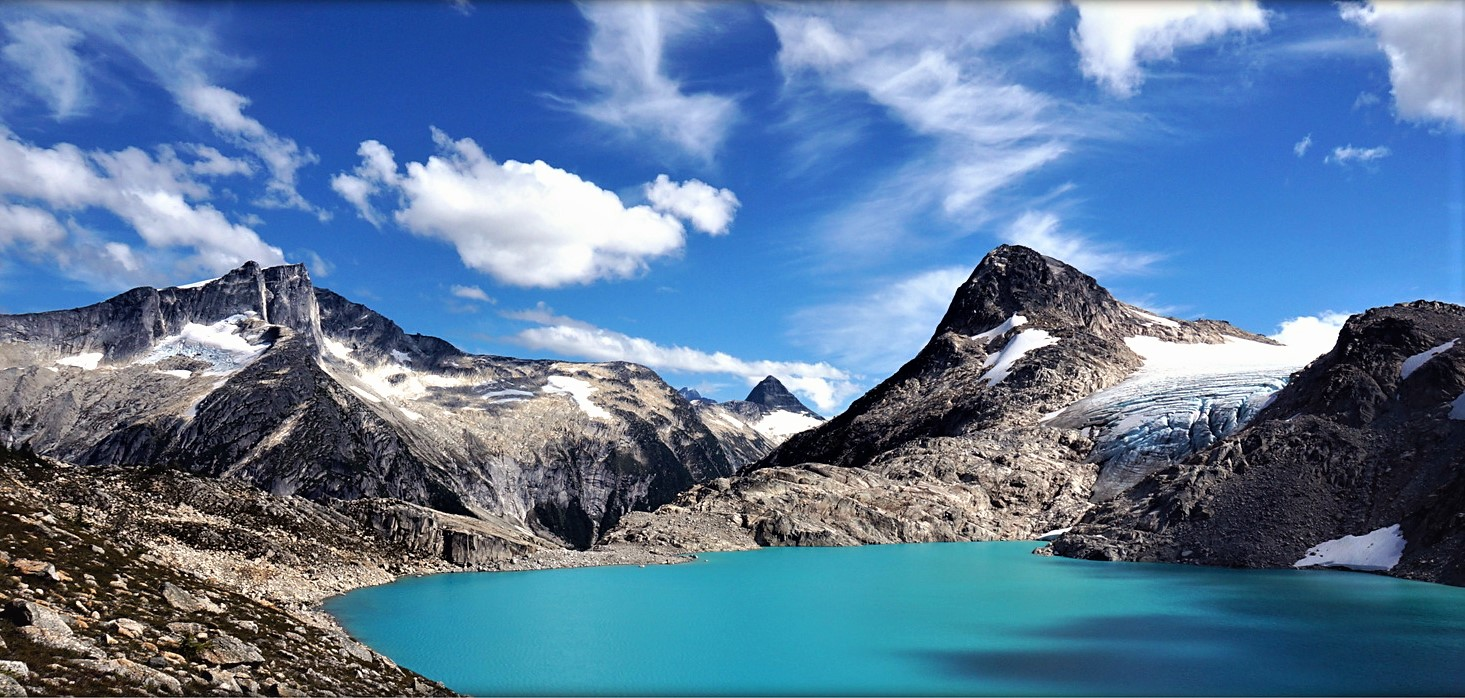
Big Snow (left) from Emerald Lake

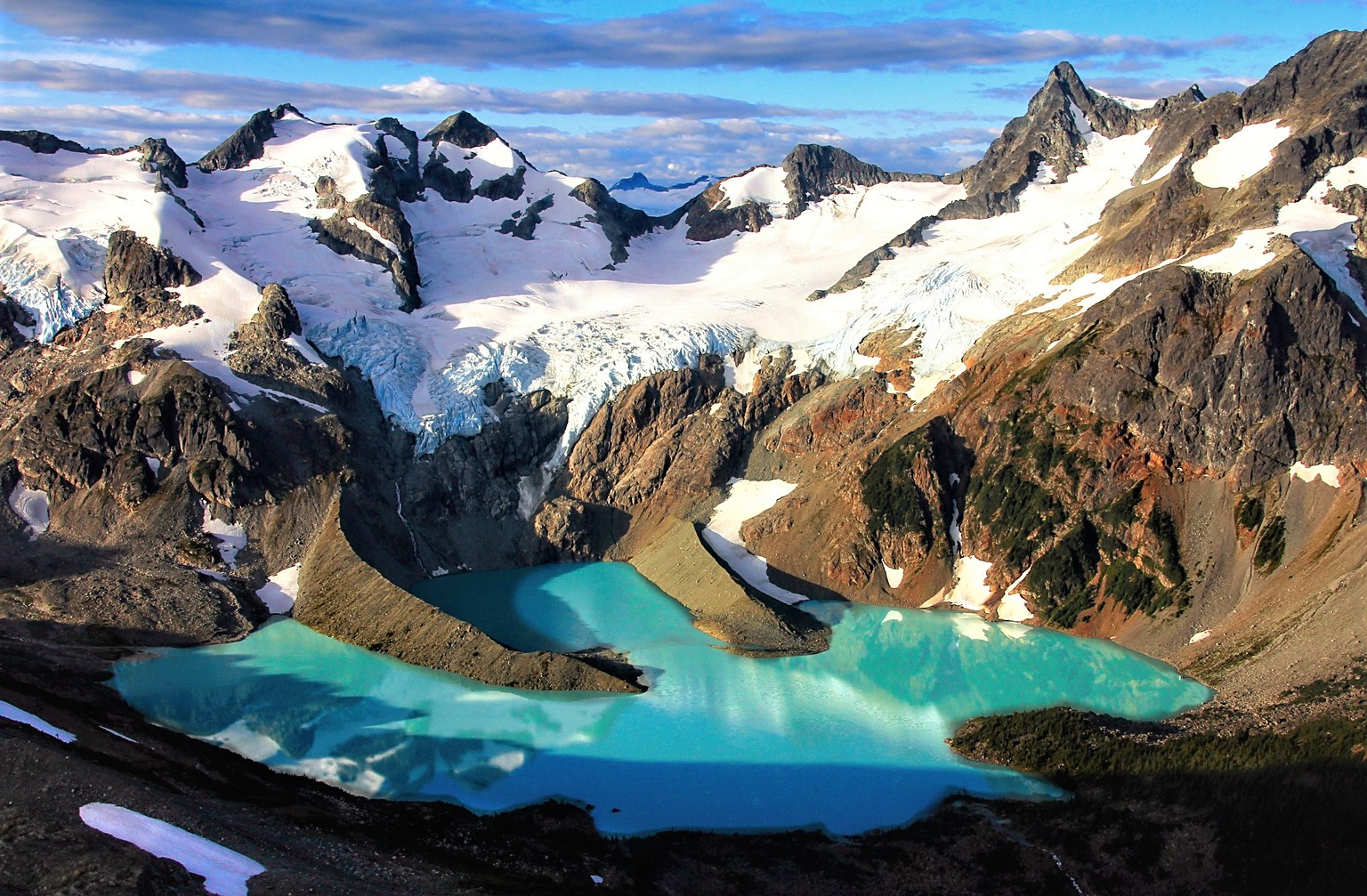
Howe Lake is located 6 km west of Big Snow

== See also ==
- Geography of British Columbia
