= List of Nuxalk villages =

This is a list of Nuxalk villages.

By 1953 there were only two bodies of Nuxalk left: The Kimsquit, on Dean Inlet; and the Bella Coola, at the mouth of Bella Coola River. Older writers speak of the Nuhalk (Nuxalk), which was the name of the Bella Coola Valley; Talyumc, whose village at the head of South Bentinck Arm (Ats'aaxlh) was abandoned about 1933; and the Noothlakamishb (Nuxalkmc) on North Bentinck Arm, reported by Tolmie, and by Dawson in 1884.

Today Nuxalkmc live primarily in two villages, the village of Bella Coola, and the village of Snxlhh, also known as 4-mile, but continue to use their entire territory.

== Villages ==
(as given by McIlwraith, cited by John Reed Swanton)

Modern Nuxalk language orthography is in brackets, as is the meaning of the name.

- Aimats (Aymats), north of Ahutskwakstl (Anutsqaaxlh) near the Peisela River (Piisla).
- Aketi (Acati), on the south side of the Dean River (about 1 mile from the sea)
- Anutlitlk, near the mouth of Dean River, still occupied (Anutl'lhlc - abandoned almost a hundred years now)
- Anutskwakstl (Anutsquutslh or anutsqaaxlh), an eastern extension of Tlokotl (Tl'uk'uulh).
- Aseik, (Asiiqw - head of channel) on a stream flowing into a bay at the southwest end of South Bentinck Arm (Ats'aaxlh).
- Asenane, (Asanani/Asinani) on the shore of a bay on the south side of the Bella Coola River (Nuxalk).
- Asktlta (Asklhta), at Salmon House on the Upper Dean River.
- Atlklaktl, (Alhqlaaxlh - fenced village) near the south bank of the Peisela River (Piisla) about ¼-mile from the sea.
- Ikwink, on the Dean River 28 miles from the sea.
- Kadis, (Q'xtis) on the east side of South Bentinck Arm, about ¼-mile from the Noieck River (actually located closer to Ts'awlhmim than to Nuwikw').
- Kameik, (Qamiix) on the west bank of the Necleetsconnay River (Nutcictskwani) about ¾-mile from the sea (also the name of the creek and mountain, and matches the location of the village of Ts'alh)
- Kantkilsk, (Qnklst - rocky-below / island) on the east side of South Bentinck Arm "slightly north of Bensins Island (also called Qnklst), which is opposite the hot springs (Icp'iixm) on the west side of the fjord (Ats'aaxlh)."
- Kimsquit (K'mckw'itxw), village in the Kimsquit region.
- Koapk, (Qw'apx) on the east side of the mouth of a creek (Asiixw) entering the head of South Bentinck Arm (Ats'aaxlh) from the south.
- Komkutis, (Q'umk'uts) the upper (eastern) continuation of Stskeitl (Sts'kiilh).
- Kwiliutl, (Qwlyulh) on the north side of the Atnarko (Lhaaxlc) a few hundred yards above the forks (the fork with the Talchako or Whitewater).
- Nuekmak, (Nu7iixmaqw's) near some stagnant pools on the north side of Bella Coola River a short distance above Snoönikwilk (Snu7unikwlxs) (though the pools are known to have been on the south side).
- Nuhwilst, (Nucwlst) on the shore of Dean Channel six miles from Satsk (Satskw).
- Nuiku, (Nuwikw') on a raised mound on South Bentinck Arm (Ats'aaxlh) south of the mouth of the Noieck River (Nuwikw').
- Nukaakmats, (Snuqaaxmats') on the north shore of the Bella Coola River about a mile above Tsilkt (Ts'lkt - alternatively, Ts'likt).
- Nukits, (Nukits' - twisted water) on the south side of the Bella Coola River 11¼ miles from the sea, upper end of site of the modern village of Hagensborg.
- Nuskapts, (Nusqap'ts) on the south bank of the Dean River about 25 miles from the sea.
- Nuskek, (Nusxiq') on the shore of North Bentinck east of the creek that flows into it at Green Bay (Nusxiq').
- Nuskelst, (Nusq'lst) on the north side of the Bella Coola River (Nuxalk) opposite the mountain of the same name (Nusq'lst).
- Nutal, (Nutl'l) on the bank of the Dean River at the bottom of the canyon (Nutl'l).
- Nutltleik, (Nutl'lhiixw - dry headwaters, modern day Burnt Bridge) 200 yards from the Bella Coola River on a creek flowing in from the north and about 31 miles from the sea.
- Nutskwatlt, on the south side of the Dean River about 1¼-miles from the sea.
- Okmikimik, (Uqmikmc) at the present village of Hagensborg 11 miles from the sea.
- Ososkpimk, on the north shore of the Bella Coola River about ½-mile above Aimats.
- Satsk, (Satskw) at the mouth of the Kimsquit River, today Chatscah Indian Reserve No. 2.
- Senktl, (Snxlhh) on the south side of the Bella Coola River opposite Tciktciktelpats (Sts’icts’icwtalhp)
- Setlia, (Salhya - Tallio Point) on the east side of South Bentinck Arm about ¼-mile from its junction with North Bentinck.
- Siwalos, (Siwalusim - where the canoes were left) on the north side of the Dean River about 35 miles from the sea, where the trail to the Interior (Sutkalhta - winter trail) left the river valley.
- Skomeltl, (Squmalh - the name of a site, creek and valley) on the south side of the Bella Coola River about 3 miles from the sea (the upper end of Snxlhh and Tsumuulh).
- Snoönikwilk, (Snu7unikwlxs - West Point) on a curving promontory on the south bank of the Bella Coola River about 4 miles from the sea (actually the name of the ridge on the north side of the river).
- Snutele, (Snut'li - place of dog salmon) on the south bank of the Bella Coola River above Nukaakmats (Also the name of the creek and valley that begin there).
- Snutlelelatl, on the north side of the Atnarko River about 10 miles from the forks.
- Stskeitl, (Sts'kiilh) on the south bank of the Bella Coola River about ¼-mile from the sea.
- Stuik (Stuwic, Stwic)(Stuie, on the point between the Atnarko and Whitewater (Talchako) Rivers, which join to form the Bella Coola.
- Talio, (Talyuu) on the west side of the mouth of the Nuwikw river, last location, which was frequently changed.
- Tasaltlimk, (ts'alh or ts'alhmc) on the shore of North Bentinck Arm west and north of the mouth of the Necleetsconnay river (Nutcictskwani).
- Tciktciktelpats, (Possibly Tsipscaaxuts) some distance from the north bank of the Bella Coola River, the river course having changed.
- Tlokotl, (Tl'uk'uulh - high mound) above Atlkaktl (Alhqlaaxlh) on the Peisela Creek (Piisla).
- Tsaotltmem, (Ts'awlhmim - Camp 2 bay) on the east side of South Bentinck Arm about 4 miles from Kankilst (Qnklst).
- Tsilkt, (Ts'lkt or Ts'likt) on the north shore of the Bella Coola River above Tsomootl (Tsumuulh - noisy rock).
- Tsomootl, (Tsumuulh - Sound of water over a rock) the upper continuation of Skomeltl (Squmalh).

Boas (1898) gives also the following names, most of which are probably synonyms for some of the above:

- Koatlna (Kwalhna - inlet south of South Bentinck)
- Nusatsem (Nusats'm - place of dried up humpies, village and creek at Noosatsum creek and synonym to Asinani)
- Osmakmiketlp (Usmicmikalhp - place of harvesting spruce trees - unknown location)
- Peisela (Piisla)
- Sakta
- Selkuta
- Slaaktl (Slaaxlh - likely the name of the Talchako river)
- Sotstl (Sutslh - the village at mouth of Kimsquit River)
- Tkeiktskune (Nu-tcictskwani - River running north at the mouth of the Bella Coola river)
- Tskoakkane

From other sources:

- Noosgulch (Nus’qulst): Village near the confluence of the Noosgulch River and Bella Coola River, near Nusatsum Mountain. Abandoned around 1880.

== Sources ==
- The Indian Tribes of North America, John Swanton, 1953, quoted in canadiangeneaology.net website
- A Concise Nuxalk-English Dictionary, Hank Nater, 1990. Canadian Museum of Civilization.
