= Noohalk Mountain =

Mountain in the country of Canada

Coordinates: 52°20′00″N 126°37′45″W

Highest point
- Elevation: 2099 m

Geography
- Countries: Pacific Ranges of the Coast Mountains in British Columbia, Canada

Noohalk Mountain 2099 m (6886 feet) is a mountain in the northernmost Pacific Ranges of the Coast Mountains in British Columbia, Canada. It is located on the south side of the Bella Coola Valley between Hagensborg and Bella Coola. Noohalk Mountain is part of the rugged landscape of central coastal British Columbia. The surrounding area features high mountains, temperate rainforests, and deep valleys, making it popular with hikers and nature lovers.

== Name origin ==
"Noohalk" is an older transliteration of the local native name for the valley and the river, which has been adopted as the modern name of that people, the Nuxalk, who once had villages all through the adjoining inlets and islands of North and South Bentinck Arms, Dean Channel, Burke Channel and on King Island.
