= Asseek River =

River in British Columbia

Coordinates: 51°57′44″N 126°40′42″W

The Asseek River is a river in the Central Coast region of British Columbia, Canada, flowing north out of the Pacific Ranges to enter saltwater at the head of South Bentinck Arm. The name has been used since 1930, but an earlier map from 1913 shows it as the Talolail River. Also entering South Bentinck Arm a few miles north on the east side of the inlet is the Taleomey River, whose estuary forms Taleomey Narrows, a constriction of the inlet, and also where is the location of Taleomy Indian Reserve No. 3 of the Nuxalk Nation. Another constriction south of the Taleomey estuary, and immediately north of the Asseek's mouth is Bentinck Narrows, which is formed by the alluvial fan of Ickna Creek.

There was a Nuxalk village named Aseik in the area of the Asseek's mouth, as was also Koapk.

== See also ==
- List of rivers of British Columbia
