= Taleomey River =

River in British Columbia

Coordinates: 52°01′36″N 126°40′58″W

The Taleomey River is a river in the northernmost Pacific Ranges of the Coast Mountains in the Central Coast region of British Columbia, Canada, flowing west to South Bentinck Arm where its waters enter the sea a few miles north of the head of that inlet. The Asseek River also enters the head of South Bentinck Arm, flowing into its head from the south.

Immediately north of the Taleomey estuary, the Noeick River also enters South Bentinck Arm. On the north side of that river's mouth is the locality of South Bentinck.

Taleomy Indian Reserve No. 3, which is governed by the Nuxalk Nation, is located at the mouth of the Taleomey River. South Bentinck Arm is narrowed offshore from the estuary of the river by Taleomey Narrows.

== See also ==
- Tallheo
- Tallheo Hot Springs
- List of rivers of British Columbia
