= Tallheo =

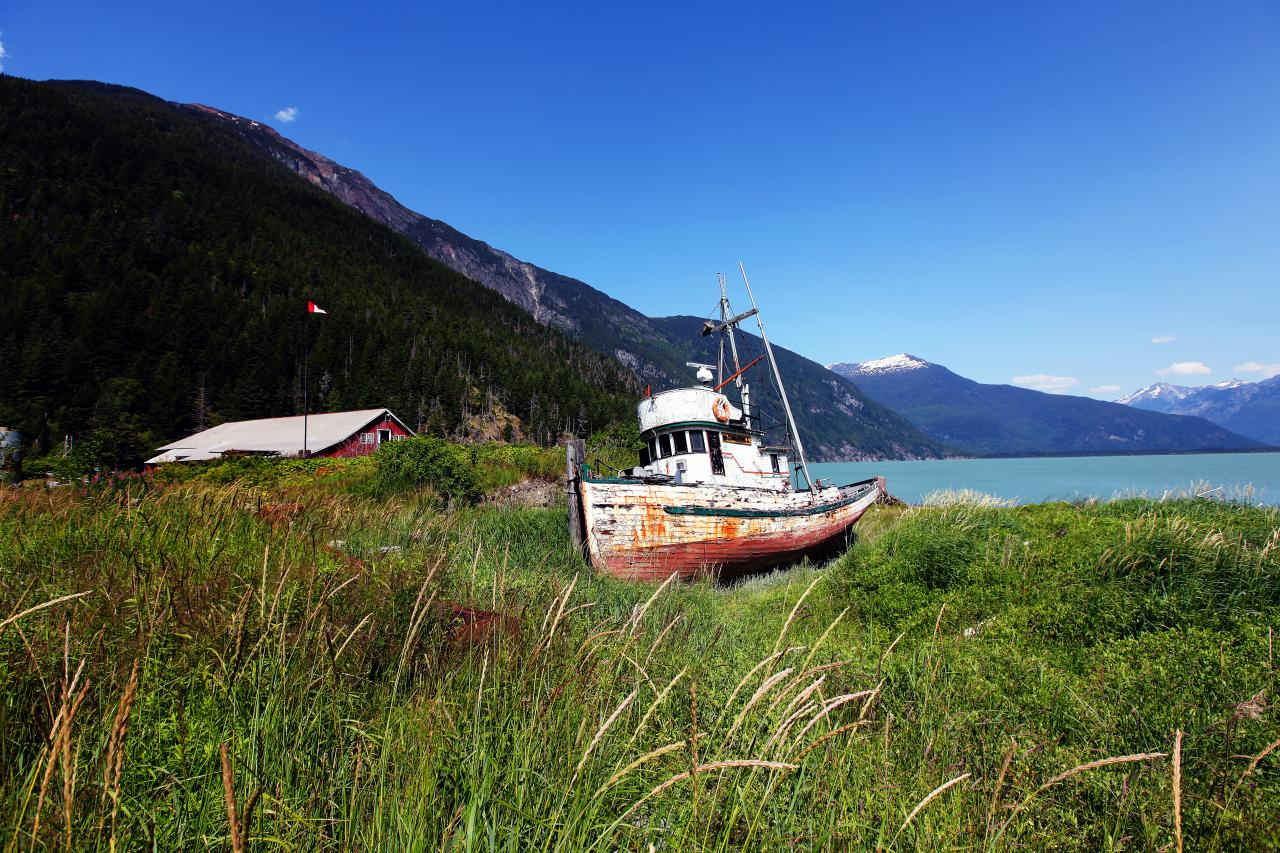

- Location of Tallheo in British Columbia
- Coordinates: 52°23′39″N 126°49′57″W
- Country: Canada
- Province: British Columbia
- Time zone: UTC−07:00 (PT)
- Area codes: 250, 778

Tallheo is the location of a former village of the Nuxalk known as Talyu, and is a former cannery town near Bella Coola, British Columbia, Canada, on North Bentinck Arm. Tallheo is also the name of the dialect of the Nuxalk language spoken by the Talhyumc, the particular subgroup of the Nuxalk who live there.

In 1905 the Tallheo Cannery was started by a Norwegian immigrant, a member of the block settlement at what became Hagensborg in the Bella Coola Valley nearby, employing members of the Talhiyumc and local Norwegian-Canadian community and many others. The cannery specialized in sockeye, coho, pink, chum, and spring salmon and was owned by the Canadian Fishing Company, whose headquarters were in Vancouver.

Tallheo Cannery now operates as a bed and breakfast.

Tallheo should not be confused with Tallheo Hot Springs, which is located on the west bank of South Bentinck Arm.

== See also ==
- List of canneries in British Columbia
