= Hotnarko River =

River in British Columbia, Canada

Coordinates: 52°21′34″N 125°46′54″W

The Hotnarko River is a river in the Bella Coola Valley subregion of the Central Coast region of British Columbia, Canada. It is a tributary of the Atnarko River flowing southwest to meet that river a few miles upstream from the locality of Atnarko, which is southeast up the Atnarko River from Stuie, which is at the base of the "Big Hill" down from the Chilcotin Plateau into the Bella Coola Valley.

== See also ==
- List of rivers of British Columbia
