= Atnarko =

Settlement in British Columbia, Canada

Coordinates: 52°24′00″N 125°50′00″W

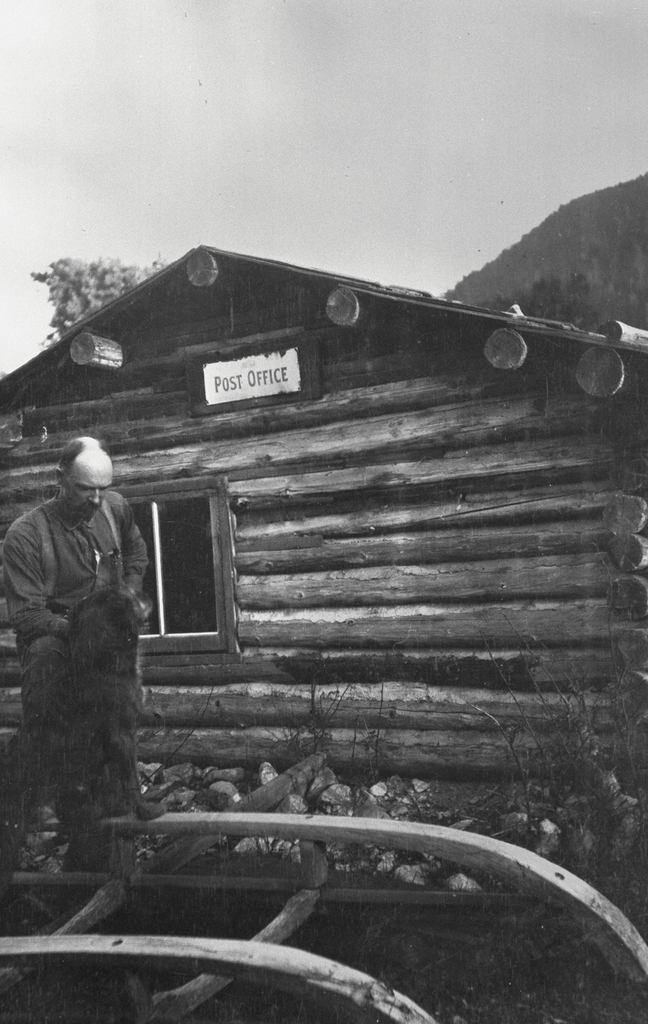
Old post office, Atnarko

Atnarko is a locality on the Atnarko River, at the south end of Tweedsmuir Provincial Park in the Bella Coola Valley region of British Columbia, Canada. The original name of the post office located here was Anaham, a name associated with the Tsilhqot'in people of the neighbouring Chilcotin Country region. Opened under that name in 1907, it was changed to Atnarko in 1913, with the post office itself closing in 1932.

== Location ==
It is located southeast of the community of Stuie, which is at the base of the "Big Hill" where BC Hwy 20 descends from the Chilcotin Plateau into the Bella Coola Valley. The Hotnarko River joins the Atnarko River a few miles further upstream to the southeast.
