= Horribilis Peak =

Mountain in British Columbia, Canada

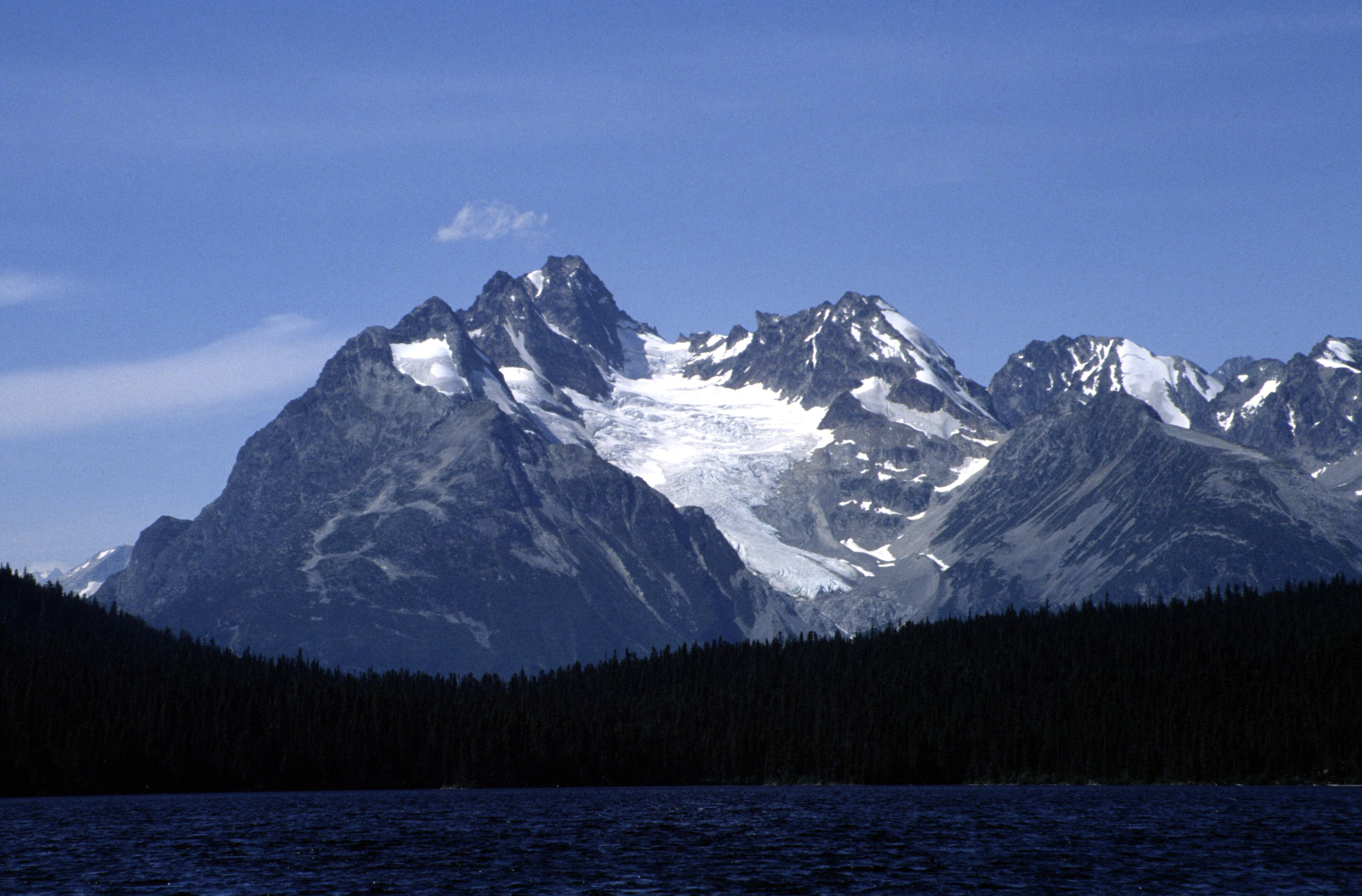
- Horribilis Peak from Kidney Lake

Highest point
- Elevation: 2,654 m (8,707 ft)
- Prominence: 584 m (1,916 ft)
- Parent peak: Utan Peak (2747 m)
- Listing: Mountains of British Columbia
- Coordinates: 52°08′19″N 126°02′10″W

Naming
- Etymology: Ursus arctos horribilis

Geography
- Location within British Columbia Location within Canada
- Interactive map of Horribilis Peak
- Location: Range 3 Coast Land District; British Columbia, Canada
- District: Range 3 Coast Land District
- Parent range: Pacific Ranges; Coast Mountains
- Topo map: NTS 93D1 Jacobsen Glacier

Climbing
- First ascent: 1964

Horribilis Peak is a 2,597-metre (8,520-foot) mountain summit located in the Coast Mountains of the Pacific Ranges in British Columbia, Canada. The mountain is situated 5.5 km (3.4 mi) north of Talchako Mountain, and 28 km (17 mi) south of Stuie. Its nearest higher peak is Utan Peak, 4 km (2.5 mi) to the northwest. The peak was named in 1964 by a George Whitemore mountaineering party in recognition of the grizzly bears upon whose territory the mountaineers were trespassing. The mountain's name was officially adopted April 15, 1984, by the Geographical Names Board of Canada. Precipitation runoff from the mountain drains into Ape Creek which is a tributary of the Talchako River.

== Climate ==
Based on the Köppen climate classification, Horribilis Peak is located in the marine west coast climate zone of western North America. Most weather fronts originate in the Pacific Ocean, and travel east toward the Coast Mountains where they are forced upward by the range (Orographic lift), causing them to drop their moisture in the form of rain or snowfall. As a result, the Coast Mountains experience high precipitation, especially during the winter months in the form of snowfall. Winter temperatures can drop below −20 °C with wind chill factors below −30 °C.

== Gallery ==
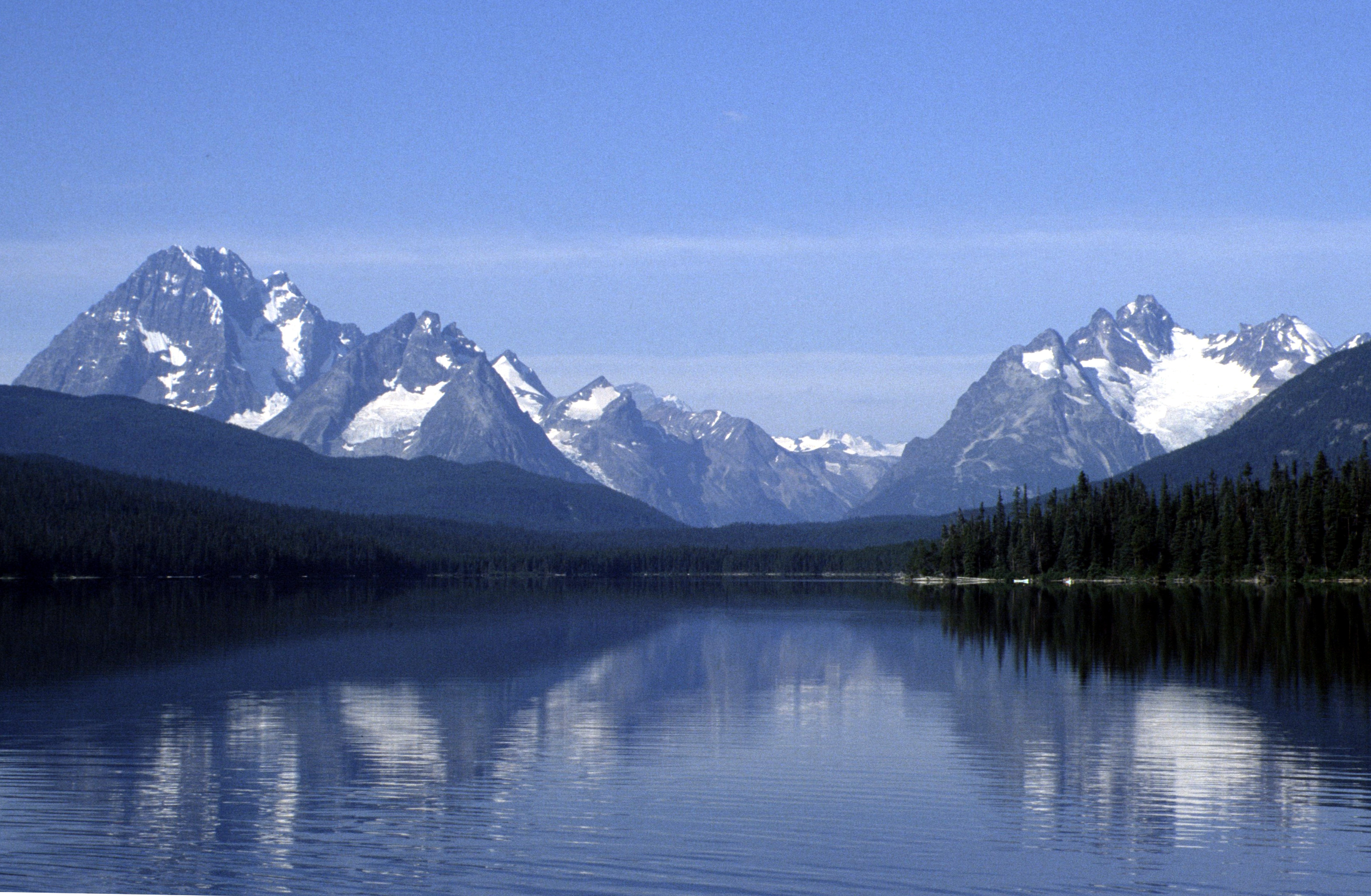
Talchako Mountain (left) and Horribilis Peak (right) seen from Junker Lake

== See also ==
- Geography of British Columbia
