= Bensins Island =

Island in British Columbia, Canada

Coordinates: 52°13′01″N 126°55′17″W

- Interactive map of Bensins Island

Geography
- Location: Canada
- Total islands: 1

Demographics
- Population: 0

Bensins Island is the only island in South Bentinck Arm, an inlet (fjord) in the Central Coast region of British Columbia, Canada. It is located across the inlet from Tallheo Hot Springs. Slightly north of the island on the shore of the inlet was Qnklst, a Nuxalk village. Qnklst is a Nuxalk name for "island" meaning "stone bottom" or "a bottom of stone".

== Name origin ==
The name is a corruption of "Menzies", in reference to Archibald Menzies, the naturalist of Captain Vancouver's expedition to the Pacific Northwest.

== See also ==
- List of islands of British Columbia
