= Nuxalk =

Salishan ethnic group of British Columbia, Canada

Nuxalkmc
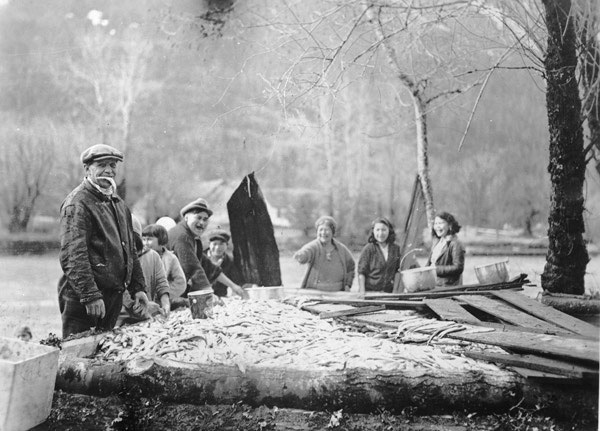
- Nuxalk people gathered around an eulachon stink box near the Bella Coola River.

Regions with significant populations
- Bella Coola, British Columbia

Languages
- English, Nuxalk

Religion
- Nuxalk religion, Christianity, other

Related ethnic groups
- other Coast Salish peoples

Nuxalk
- Person: Nuxalkmc
- People: Nuxalkmc
- Language: It7Nuxalkmc
- Country: Kulhulmcilh (Nuxalkulmc)

The Nuxalk people (Nuxalk: Nuxalkmc; pronounced [ʔnuχalcmç]), also referred to as the Bella Coola, Bellacoola or Bilchula, are a First Nation of the Pacific Northwest Coast, centred in the area in and around Bella Coola, British Columbia within their wider traditional territory: Kulhulmcilh. They speak the Nuxalk language (Nuxalk: It7Nuxalkmc). Their on-reserve tribal government is the Nuxalk Nation.

== Name and tribes/groups ==
The name "Bella Coola", often used in academic writing, is not preferred by the Nuxalk; it is a derivation of the neighbouring Wakashan-speaking coastal Heiltsuk people's name for the Nuxalk as bəlxwəlá or bḷ́xʷlá, meaning "stranger" (rendered plxwla in Nuxalk orthography). Within the Nuxalk language, "Nuxalkmc" is the term for the people, and "It7Nuxalkmc" is the term for the language, and these terms are increasingly being used in English locally.

The Nuxalk peoples, known today collectively as Nuxalkmc, are made up of lineages representing several ancestral villages within their territory. From Kimsquit, known as Sutslhm in the Nuxalk language, come the Sutslhmc. From the Dean River come the Nutl'lmc, as well as lineages from the upper Dean River. From South Bentinck Arm (Atsʼaaxlh) come the Talyumc of Tallheo, from the villages at the Nuwikw, Talyu and Asiiqw rivers. From Kwatna Inlet (Kwʼalhna) come the Kwalhnmc, from several villages. From King Island (Ista) come the Istamc, and from the Bella Coola River (Nuxalk) come the Nuxalkmc, from some twenty five Nuxalk villages extending all the way up to Stuwic and beyond up both the Atnarko and Talchako rivers. These were all gathered in their current location in the Bella Coola Valley (Nuxalk) by a combination of negotiation with Chief Pootlass and through government pressure, settling together based on cultural and linguistic similarities, reinforced by a large number of marriages arranged to ease the transition. As all these communities now resided on area of the lower Bella Coola river known as Nuxalk, they took the collective name of Nuxalkmc, and their language has also come to be known as It7Nuxalkmc. Not everyone settled within the current communities in that valley, and as such the Nuxalk share many family ties with their neighbours and beyond, most extensively with the Heiltsuk in Waxvwuisaxv and with the Ulkatchot’en.

== History and culture ==
Before contact, the Nuxalk population is estimated to have been approximately 35,000, according to oral histories and academic research, although Mooney in 1928 estimated that there were 1,400 Nuxalk in 1780. The 1862 Pacific Northwest smallpox epidemic (Usqalitsʼ txw) reduced the Nuxalk to only 300 survivors by 1864. In 1902, according to Mooney, there were 302. Nuxalk people were scattered throughout the territory and either relocated on their own to survive, or were forcibly removed by the Department of Indian Affairs (once that institution was created a few decades later), to form a settlement in what is now known as the Bella Coola Valley (the reserve is a mile or so upriver and east from the town of Bella Coola).

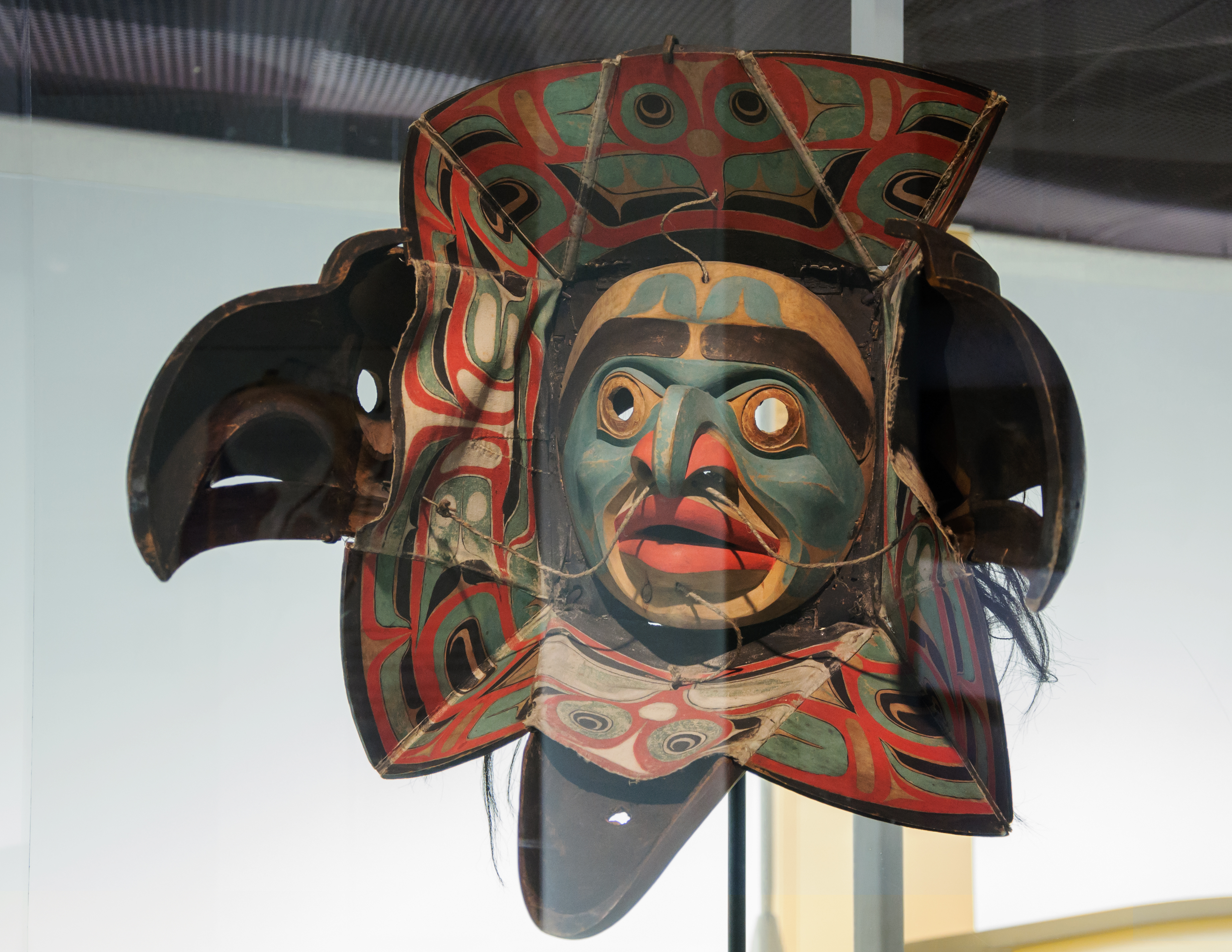
Nuxalk transformation mask, 19th century

Knowledge of family ancestry remains strong among the Nuxalk, including villages of descent, family crests, as well as songs and dances that recount the history and myth in smayusta. Nuxalk religion includes belief in a creator god (Alhkwʼntam), a war goddess (Qamaits) and a sea god (Qʼumakwa), among others. Nuxalk society remains close-knit and embraces traditional beliefs.

The Nuxalk as a people and via their established and titles to their traditional territory continue to maintain their traditional systems of governance, based on their long and rich cultural history and continued use and occupation.

The Nuxalk Nation has long asserted its rights and obligations and has never ceded, sold, surrendered, nor lost traditional lands through act of war or by treaty. The Nuxalk remain strongly against entering any treaty process.

Current Indian and Northern Affairs Canada (INAC) population estimates indicate a total Nuxalk population of approximately 1400 with nearly 900 of those living on the Nuxalk reserve in Bella Coola. However, according to the traditional Nuxalk government, the true Nuxalk population is closer to 3,000. This number includes people of Nuxalk ancestry who are not registered with the Nuxalk Nation or may be registered to another band government.

Nuxalk culture and society have been profiled in the documentary films of Banchi Hanuse, most notably Nuxalk Radio (2020) and Ceremony (2026).

== See also ==
- Fort McLoughlin
- List of Nuxalk villages
