= Mount Jacobsen =

Mountain in British Columbia, Canada

- Location within British Columbia
- Interactive map of Mount Jacobsen

Highest point
- Elevation: 3,031 m (9,944 ft)
- Coordinates: 52°03′29″N 126°11′19″W

Geography
- Location: British Columbia, Canada
- District: Range 3 Coast Land District
- Parent range: Pacific Ranges
- Topo map: NTS 93D1 Jacobsen Glacier

Mount Jacobsen, 3,031 m (9,944 ft), is a mountain in the northernmost Pacific Ranges of the Coast Mountains in the Central Coast region of British Columbia, Canada, located to the south of the Bella Coola Valley and immediately south of Ape Lake, to the west of the valley of the Talchako River.

The Noeick River begins at the Noeick Glacier on the northwest side of the peak at 52°06′00″N 126°16′00″W. In the same massif and immediately west of the peak of Mount Jacobsen is West Jacobsen Peak, 2971 m (9747 feet) at 52°03′25″N 126°12′09″W. Ape Glacier, named in association with Ape Lake and Ape Mountain, is on the north side of the Jacobsen massif. at 52°05′00″N 126°12′00″W.

== Name origin ==
Mount Jacobsen and West Jacobsen Peak are named for B.F. Jacobsen, who settled in the Bella Coola Valley prior to 1890 and was who encouraged the Reverend Christian Saugstad, the namesake of Mount Saugstad, to move his colony of Norwegian immigrants to Bella Coola from Minnesota.
