= Talchako Mountain =

Mountain in British Columbia, Canada

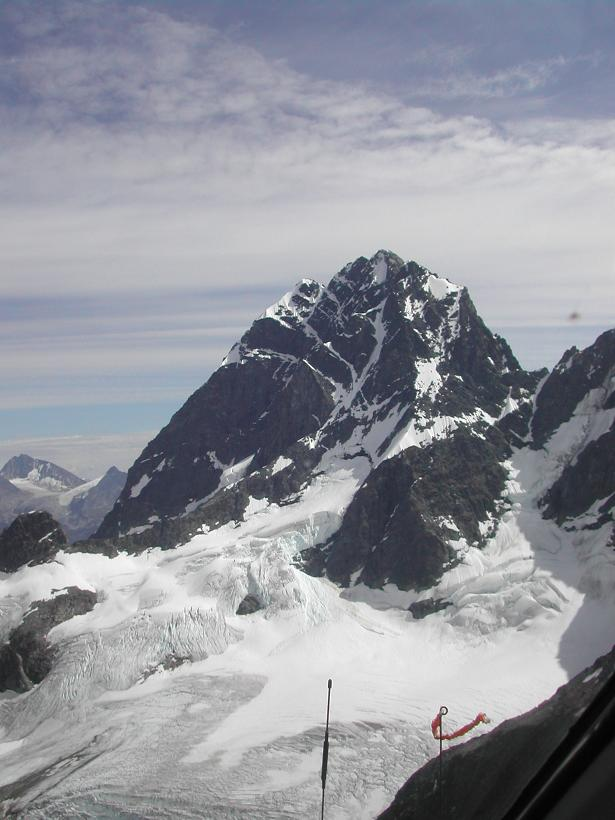
- Talchako Mountain from the northwest

Highest point
- Elevation: 3,037 m (9,964 ft)
- Listing: Mountains of British Columbia
- Coordinates: 52°05′31″N 126°00′57″W

Geography
- Location within British Columbia Location within Canada
- Location: Range 3 Coast Land District; British Columbia, Canada
- District: Range 3 Coast Land District
- Parent range: Pacific Ranges ← Coast Mountains
- Topo map: NTS 93D1 Jacobsen Glacier

Climbing
- First ascent: 1961 by G. Whitemore, J. Wilson, R. Houston
- Easiest route: rock scramble

Talchako Mountain is one of the principal summits of the Pacific Ranges subdivision of the Coast Mountains in southern British Columbia. It stands west of the Talchako River, and north of the Monarch Icefield. The mountain is situated 5.5 km (3.4 mi) south of Horribilis Peak, and 33 km (20 mi) south of Stuie.

The north face is composed of steep rock and snow with a glacier and the south portion of the mountain is composed of rock gullies and snow. The east face has an impressive relief of 1000 or more meters of technical terrain.

== Climate ==
Based on the Köppen climate classification, Talchako Mountain is located in the marine west coast climate zone of western North America. Most weather fronts originate in the Pacific Ocean, and travel east toward the Coast Mountains where they are forced upward by the range (Orographic lift), causing them to drop their moisture in the form of rain or snowfall. As a result, the Coast Mountains experience high precipitation, especially during the winter months in the form of snowfall. Temperatures can drop below −20 °C with wind chill factors below −30 °C.

== Gallery ==
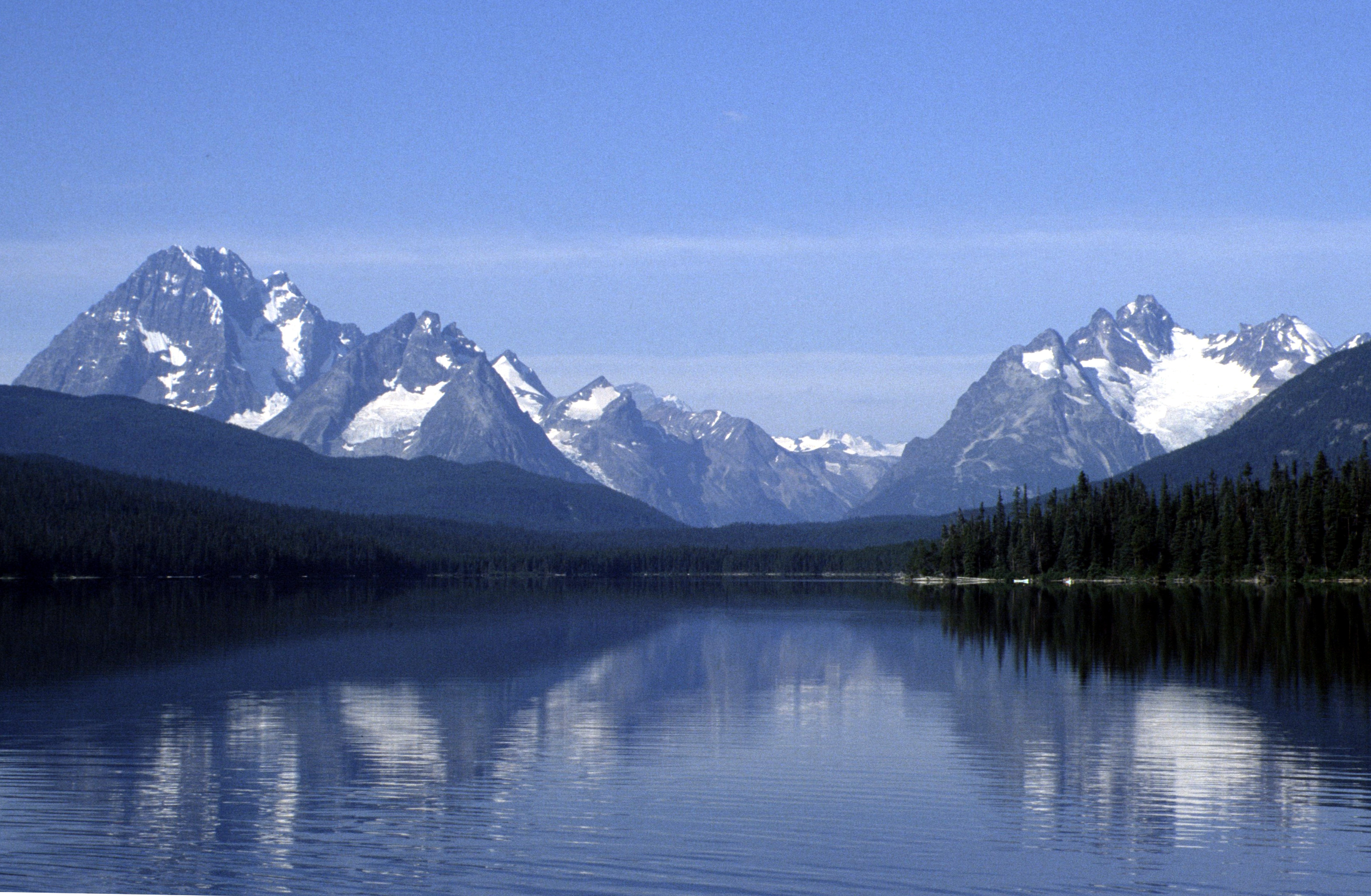
Talchako Mountain (left) and Horribilis Peak (right) seen from Junker Lake

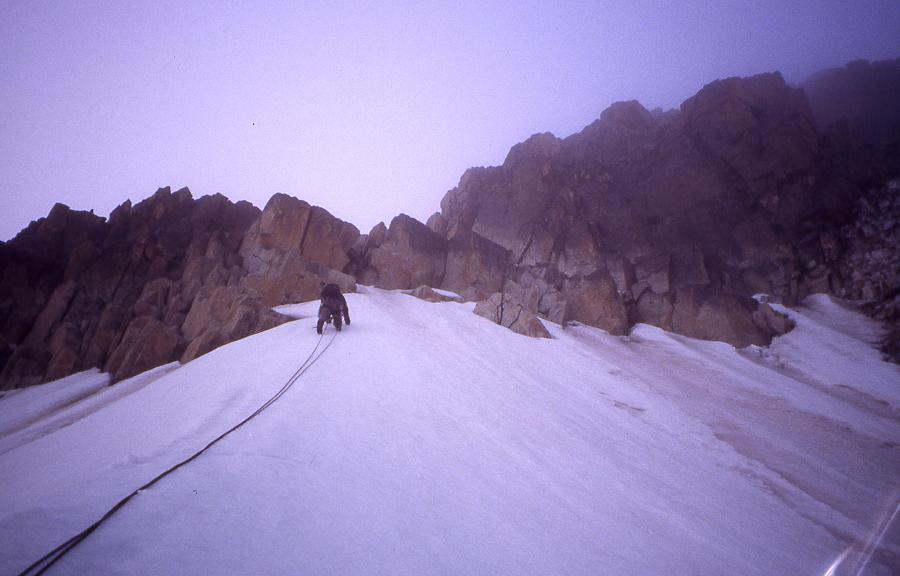
Talchako NE Ridge

== See also ==
- Geography of British Columbia
