= Taleomy Indian Reserve No. 3 =

Coordinates: 52°02′00″N 126°40′00″W

Taleomy Indian Reserve No. 3, officially Taleomy 3, is an Indian reserve under the governance of the Nuxalk Nation, located at the mouth of the Taleomey River on the east shore of South Bentinck Arm in the Central Coast region of British Columbia, Canada.

== See also ==
- Tallheo Hot Springs
- List of Indian reserves in British Columbia
