= Smitley River =

Coordinates: 52°04′04″N 126°34′58″W

The Smitley River is a river in the northernmost Pacific Ranges of the Coast Mountains in British Columbia, Canada, flowing southeast to join the Noeick River a few miles above its outlet into South Bentinck Arm. The Smitley begins on the east flank of Mount Saugstad.

== See also ==
- List of rivers of British Columbia
