= Takia River =

Coordinates: 52°44′47″N 126°20′30″W

The Takia River is a tributary of the Dean River in British Columbia, Canada, flowing northwest to meet the Dean to the south of Sigutlat Lake. Salmon House Falls is located at the confluence of the two rivers, which is to the northwest of Tsitsutl Peak.

There was a Nuxalk village, Asktlta, located at this spot, which was known also as Salmon House.

== See also ==
- List of rivers of British Columbia
