= Mount Saugstad =

Mountain in the country of Canada

- Location within British Columbia
- Interactive map of Mount Saugstad

Highest point
- Elevation: 2,908 m (9,541 ft)
- Prominence: 1,850 m (6,070 ft)
- Listing: Mountains of British Columbia
- Coordinates: 52°15′47″N 126°31′41″W

Geography
- Location: British Columbia, Canada
- District: Range 3 Coast Land District
- Parent range: Pacific Ranges
- Topo map: NTS 93D7 Bella Coola

Mount Saugstad is a mountain in the northernmost Pacific Ranges of the Coast Mountains in the Central Coast region of British Columbia, Canada. It is located just south of the community of Hagensborg in the Bella Coola Valley and is immediately southeast of Snootli Peak and also southeast of Big Snow Mountain. The Smitley River has its origins on the west side of the summit at the Saugstad Glacier, which is at 52°15′48″N 126°31′36″W

== Name origin ==
Mount Saugstad was named for the Reverend Christian Saugstad, the leader of a Norwegian colony in Minnesota who was encouraged to move the colony to Bella Coola by settler B.F. Jacobsen, who had moved to the area prior to 1890. The Reverend Saugstad was the pastor of the local congregation until his death in 1897. Mount Jacobsen to the southeast was named for B.F. Jacobsen, as was the adjacent West Jacobsen Peak in the same massif following suit.

== See also ==
- Hagensborg
