= Noosgulch River =

Coordinates: 52°26′01″N 126°23′30″W

The Noosgulch River is a river in the Bella Coola Valley of the Central Coast region of British Columbia, Canada, flowing southwest from the southernmost Kitimat Ranges to meet the Bella Coola River just north of Nusatsum Mountain.

== See also ==
- List of rivers of British Columbia
