= Tallheo Hot Springs =

Thermal spring in British Columbia, Canada

Coordinates: 52°12′18″N 126°56′23″W

Tallheo Hot Springs is a hot spring located on the west shore of South Bentinck Arm, an inlet on the Central Coast of British Columbia, Canada, located southwest of the community of Bella Coola. The hot springs, which are known as Ix7piixm in the Nuxalk language, are located opposite Bensins Island, the only island in South Bentinck Arm.

== See also ==
- Taleomey River
- List of hot springs
