= Charlotte Lake (British Columbia) =

Lake in British Columbia, Canada

- Location within British Columbia
- Location: British Columbia
- Coordinates: 52.196°N 125.32°W
- Primary inflows: Atnarko River
- Primary outflows: Atnarko River
- Basin countries: Canada
- Max. length: 16 kilometres (9.9 mi)
- Max. width: 5.5 kilometres (3.4 mi)
- Surface area: 65.96 km^{2} (25.47 sq mi)
- Average depth: 40.6 m (133 ft)
- Max. depth: 100.9 m (331 ft)
- Water volume: 2.67 km^{3} (0.64 cu mi)
- Shore length^{1}: 42.565 km (26.449 mi)
- Surface elevation: 1,175 m (3,855 ft)
- Islands: 20
- ^{1} Shore length is not a well-defined measure.

Charlotte Lake is the second largest freshwater lake in the Chilcotin area of British Columbia, Canada. It is situated southwest of Nimpo Lake. BC Parks maintains a small camp site and boat launch on the southeast end of the lake.

== See also ==
- List of lakes of British Columbia
