= Salmon House Falls =

Waterfall in British Columbia, Canada

Coordinates: 52°44′57″N 126°20′19″W

Salmon House Falls is a waterfall at the confluence of the Takia and Dean Rivers at the western edge of the Interior Plateau, northwest of Tsitsutl Peak.

Asklhta was a Nuxalk village was located at this spot, which was known also as Salmon House.

== See also ==
- List of waterfalls in British Columbia
