= Talchako River =

Coordinates: 52°22′35″N 126°05′44″W

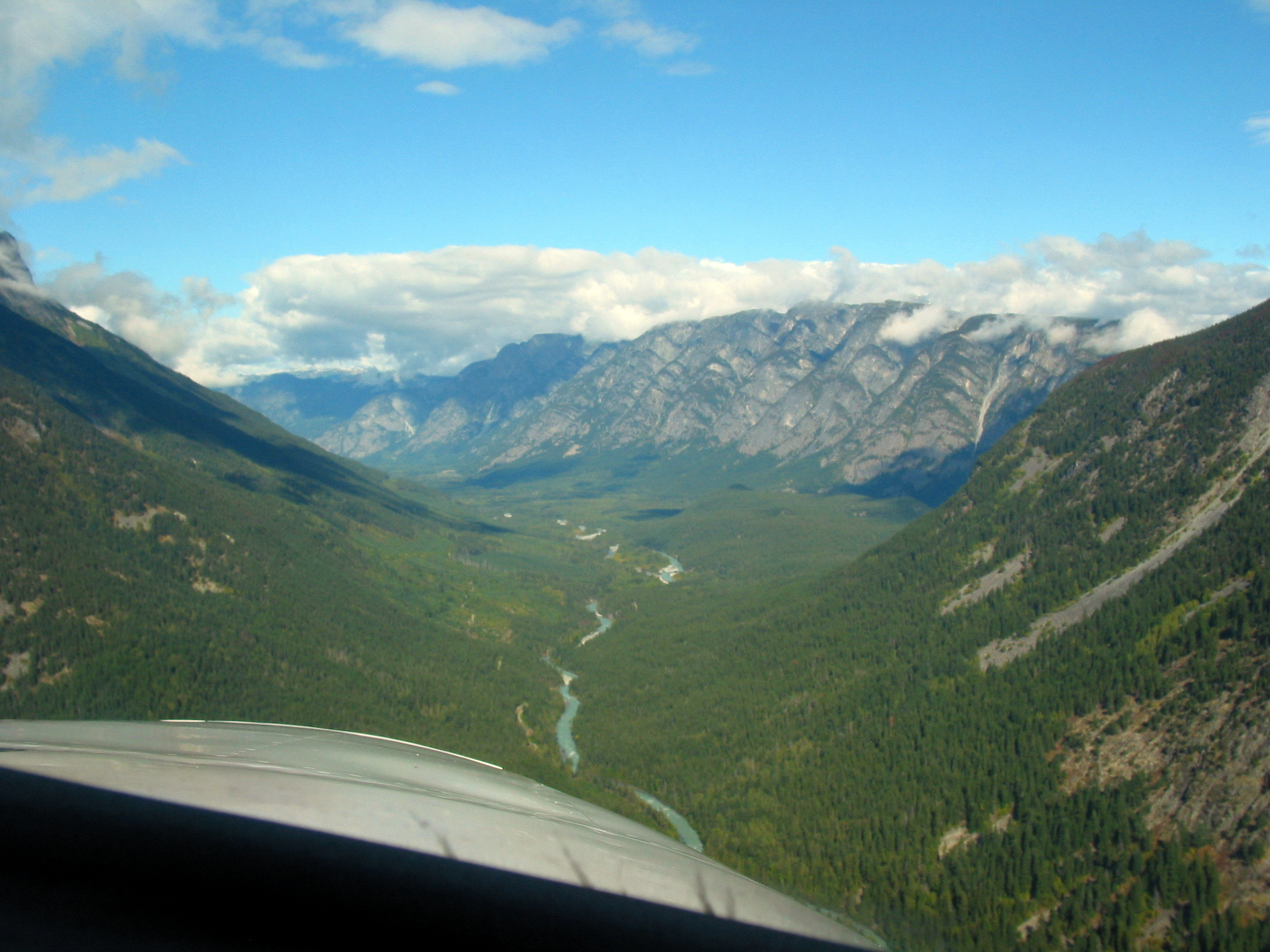
View of the Talchako Valley of the Talchako River

The Talchako River is a river in the Bella Coola Valley of the Central Coast region of British Columbia, Canada. It meets the Atnarko River at the community of Stuie to form the Bella Coola River.

== See also ==
- List of rivers of British Columbia
