= Nuxalk language =

Salishan language of British Columbia

Nuxalk
- Bella Coola
- It7Nuxalkmc
- Native to: Canada
- Region: Bella Coola area, Central Coast region, British Columbia
- Ethnicity: 1,762 Nuxalk (2022, FPCC)
- Native speakers: 3 (2022)
- Language family: Salishan: Nuxalk
- Writing system: Latin

Language codes
- ISO 639-3: blc
- Glottolog: bell1243
- ELP: Nuxalk
- Nuxalk is classified as Critically Endangered by the UNESCO Atlas of the World's Languages in Danger.

Nuxalk "Bella Coola Valley"
- Person: Nuxalk
- People: Nuxalkmc
- Language: It7Nuxalkmc
- Country: Kulhulmcilh (Nuxalkulmc)

Nuxalk (/ˈnuːhɒlk/ NOO-halk), also known as Bella Coola (/ˌbɛlə ˈkuːlə/), is a Salishan language spoken by the Nuxalk people. Today, it is an endangered language in the vicinity of the Canadian town of Bella Coola, British Columbia. While the language is still sometimes called Bella Coola by linguists, the native name Nuxalk is preferred by the Nuxalk Nation's government.

Though the number of truly fluent speakers has not increased, the language is now taught in both the provincial school system and the Nuxalk Nation's own school, Acwsalcta, meaning 'a place of learning'. Nuxalk language classes, if taken to at least the Grade 11 level, are considered adequate second-language qualifications for entry to the major B.C. universities. CKNN-FM Nuxalk Radio is also working to promote the language.

== Name ==
The name Nuxalk for the language comes from the native Nuxalk, referring to the Bella Coola Valley. Bella Coola is a rendering of the Heiltsuk bḷ́xʷlá, meaning 'stranger'.

== Geographical distribution ==
Nowadays, Nuxalk is spoken only in Bella Coola, British Columbia, surrounded by Wakashan- and Athabascan-speaking tribes. It was once spoken in over 100 settlements, with varying dialects, but in the present day most of these settlements have been abandoned and dialectal differences have largely disappeared.

== Classification ==
Nuxalk forms its own subgroup of the Salish language family. Its lexicon is equidistant from Coast and Interior Salish, but it shares phonological and morphological features with Coast Salish (e.g., the absence of pharyngeals and the presence of marked gender). Nuxalk also borrows many words from contiguous North Wakashan languages (especially Heiltsuk), as well as some from neighbouring Athabaskan and Tsimshianic languages.

== Phonology ==
=== Consonants ===
The consonants of Nuxalk are depicted below in IPA and Hank Nater's practical orthography.

		Labial	Alveolar			Velar		Uvular		Glottal
		Labial	plain	lateral	sibilant	palatal	labial	plain	labial	Glottal
Plosive/ Affricate	pulmonic	p ⟨p⟩	t ⟨t⟩		t͡s ⟨ts⟩	c ⟨k⟩	kʷ ⟨kw⟩	q ⟨q⟩	qʷ ⟨qw⟩	ʔ ⟨7⟩
Plosive/ Affricate	ejective	pʼ ⟨pʼ⟩	tʼ ⟨tʼ⟩	t͡ɬʼ ⟨tlʼ⟩	t͡sʼ ⟨tsʼ⟩	cʼ ⟨kʼ⟩	kʷʼ ⟨kwʼ⟩	qʼ ⟨qʼ⟩	qʷʼ ⟨qwʼ⟩	ʔ ⟨7⟩
Fricative				ɬ ⟨lh⟩	s ⟨s⟩	ç ⟨c⟩	xʷ ⟨cw⟩	χ ⟨x⟩	χʷ ⟨xw⟩	
Sonorant	plain	m ⟨m⟩	n ⟨n⟩	l ⟨l⟩		j ⟨y⟩	w ⟨w⟩			(ɦ) ⟨h⟩
Sonorant	syllabic	m̩ ⟨m̠⟩	n̩ ⟨n̠⟩	l̩ ⟨l̠⟩		(i) ⟨i⟩	(u) ⟨u⟩			(a) ⟨a⟩

Nuxalk is a "vowelless" language, not only because it has voiceless words, phrases and entire sentences, but also because a can be considered a syllabic laryngal (which as such belongs in the same category as m̠, n̠, l̠, i and u).

[...] Other such "vowelless" languages are Heiltsuk and Oowekyala (Kortlandt 1973 and Lincoln & Rath 1980).

— Nater (2022, p. ix)

- /p t/ have voiced [b d] and aspirated [pʰ tʰ] allophones:
  - optionally voiced between sonorants, e.g. /mn̩mn̩ta/ = [mənməndæ]
  - aspirated before stops and word boundaries;
  - optionally aspirated before fricatives, e.g. /pɬt/ = [p(ʰ)ɬtʰ]
- /c cʼ ç/ are cognate with /t͡ʃ t͡ʃʼ ʃ/ in Coast Salish.
- /c kʷ q qʷ/ are affricated [c͡ç k͡xʷ q͡χ q͡χʷ] before stops and word boundaries.
- /c cʼ ç q qʼ χ/ (and clusters thereof) are labialized before /u/:
  - kʼc /cʼç/ 'to see'
  - kʼcusis /kʷʼxʷusis/ 'he looked at his face'
  - qʼx /qʼχ/ 'to carve'
  - qʼxuusnm /qʷʼχʷuːsnm̩/ 'to be carving a face'
- The sibilants may be realized as entirely alveolar [t͡s t͡sʼ s] or postalveolar [t͡ʃ t͡ʃʼ ʃ] (independently of surrounding palatals) by elders; it is unclear if this is a vestige of historical dialectal divergence.
- The absence of a pulmonic lateral affricate /t͡ɬ/ despite the presence of its ejective counterpart, while unusual crosslinguistically, is characteristic of the Salishan family. For Nuxalk, this analysis is supported by the fact that [t͡ɬ] is in free variation with [tʰɬ] ⟨tlh⟩.
- /ɦ/ has a very low frequency (appearing in only 0.16% of vocabulary) and is therefore considered marginal.

=== Vowels ===
==== Phonemes ====
	Front	Back
Close	i, iː	u, uː
Mid	i, iː	u, uː
Open	a, aː	

- The long vowels /aː iː uː/ are pronounced with falling tone and are more open than /a i u/: [âː êː(j) ɔ̂ː(w)].

==== Allophony ====
According to Nater (1984, p. 5), the realizations of the vowels based on their position in a segment are as follows:

Phoneme	Allophone	Occurrence
/a/	[ɑ]	surrounded by postvelars
/a/	[ɐ]	before rounded velars followed by a consonant or word boundary
/a/	[ä(ː)]	before a sonorant followed by a consonant or word boundary
/a/	[æ]	elsewhere
/i/	[ɪ]	before postvelars
/i/	[ɪː~ɛː]	surrounded by postvelars
/i/	[e̞(ː)]	before a sonorant followed by a consonant or word boundary
/i/	[i]	adjacent to palatovelars
/i/	[e]	elsewhere
/u/	[o]	surrounded by postvelars
/u/	[u~ʊ]	before rounded velars followed by a consonant or word boundary
/u/	[o(ː)~ɔ(ː)]	before a sonorant followed by a consonant or word boundary
/u/	[o̞]	elsewhere

Phoneme	QVQ	VW{C,#}	VR{C,#}	VQ	VJ/JV	else
/a/	[ɑ]	[ɐ]	[ä(ː)]	[æ]		
/i/	[ɪː~ɛː]	[e]	[e̞(ː)]	[ɪ]	[i]	[e]
/u/	[o]	[u~ʊ]	[o(ː)~ɔ(ː)]	[o̞]		
Key	V = vowel | C = consonant | # = word boundary J = palatovelar | W = labiovelar | Q = postvelar | R = sonorant					

=== Phonotactics ===
Unlike many of its relatives, Nuxalk lacks phonemic stress. Phonetically, it is to a large extent subject to variation:

- yaki /ˈjaci ~ jaˈci/ 'mountain goat'
- matsʼi /ˈmat͡sʼi ~ maˈt͡sʼi/ 'cured salmon roe'

/ʔ ɦ/ occur only before sonorants. Words that would otherwise begin with a vowel have an epenthetic glottal stop; it is preserved after prefixation, with few exceptions:

- ixw 'far'
- s7ixw 'distance'
- atsʼi 'to fish with a rod'
- satsʼista 'fishing rod' (*s7atsʼista)

Epenthetic [ə] is inserted in sonorant clusters:

- mnmnta [mənməndæ] 'path, road'

/wu/ does not occur, while /ji/ occurs rarely.

==== Syllabic obstruents ====
The notion of syllable is challenged by the Nuxalk language: it allows for the construction of words, phrases and entire sentences using only obstruents, which is typologically extremely rare. Its syllable structure is unlike those of other Salishan languages and has been explained as the result of prolonged contact with Oowekyala, from which many obstruent-only roots were borrowed.

clh- pʼxwlht -lhp -lhh -s =kw =tsʼ
possess- bunchberry -plant -SEP -3SG.SUB =QUOT =PNC
'then she/he had a bunchberry plant'

kʼc -lhh -ts -cw s- lhxwt -lhh -ts
see -PLP -1SG.OBJ -3SG.SUB NMZ- pass.through -PLP -1SG.SUB
'you had seen me go through the passage'

lhxwt -lh -ts -cw
spit.TR -PERF -1SG.OBJ -3SG.SUB
'you spat on me'

For a non-exhaustive list of Nuxalk 'voiceless' words and roots, see the appendix.

There has been some dispute as to how to count syllables in such words; what, if anything, constitutes the nuclei of those syllables; and if the concept of 'syllable' is even applicable to Nuxalk. However, when recordings are available, the syllable structure can be clearly audible, and speakers have clear conceptions as to how many syllables a word contains. In general, a syllable may be C, CF (where F is a fricative), CV, or CVC. When C is a stop, CF syllables are always composed of a pulmonic stop (/p t t͡s c kʷ q qʷ/) plus a fricative (/s ɬ ç xʷ χ χʷ/). For example:

- plht /pɬ.t/ 'thick'
- tʼxt /tʼ.χ.t/ 'stone'
- stʼs /s.tʼ.s/ 'salt'
- qwt /qʷ.t/ 'crooked'
- kʼc /cʼ.ç/ 'to see'
- lhq /ɬ.q/ 'wet'

Stop-fricative sequences can also be disyllabic, however:

- tlh /t.ɬ/ 'strong'
- kws /kʷs ~ kʷ.s/ 'rough'

Syllabification of stop-fricative sequences may therefore be lexicalized or a prosodic tendency. Fricative-fricative sequences also have a tendency toward syllabicity:

- sc /sç ~ s.ç/ 'bad'
- sxs /sχ.s ~ s.χ.s/ 'fat, grease'

Speech rate plays a role, with e.g. lhxwtlhtscw 'you spat on me' consisting of all syllabic consonants in citation form (/ɬ.χʷ.t.ɬ.t͡s.xʷ/) but condensed to stop-fricative syllables (/ɬχʷ.tɬ.t͡sxʷ/) at fast conversational speed. The syllable structures of Nuxalk and Oowekyala may be compared with those of Miyako and Shilha.

==== Syllabic sonorants ====
The linguist Hank Nater has postulated the existence of a phonemic contrast between syllabic and non-syllabic sonorants (the vowel phonemes /i u a/ would then be the syllabic counterparts of /j w ɦ/). Words claimed to have unpredictable syllables include:

- smnmnmuuts /sm̩nm̩nm̩uːt͡s/ '(born) mute'
- smnmntsaw /smn̩mn̩t͡saw/ '(the fact) that they are children'
- ksnmak /csnm̩ac/ 'to work'
- clhmnalc /çɬmn̩alç/ 'to beget a child'
- astsʼlnak /ʔast͡sʼl̩nac/ 'to use a basket'

== Orthography ==
The orthography used in this article is a non-diacritical Bouchard-type practical orthography that originated in Hank Nater's The Bella Coola Language (1984), and was used in his 1990 Nuxalk-English Dictionary. It continues to be used today at Acwsalcta for Nuxalk language learning, as well as in Nuxalk documents and names. The Americanist orthography of Davis & Saunders (1997) is provided in addition. The orthographic variants are summarized below.

Nuxalk alphabet
IPA
a	aː	ç	xʷ	h	i	iː	c	cʼ	kʷ	kʷʼ	l	ɬ	m	n	p	pʼ	q	qʼ	qʷ	qʷʼ	s	t	tʼ	t͡ɬʼ	t͡s	t͡sʼ	u	uː	w	χ	χʷ	j	ʔ
APA
a	ā	x	xʷ	h	i	ī	k	k̓	kʷ	k̓ʷ	l	ł	m	n	p	p̓	q	q̓	qʷ	q̓ʷ	s	t	t̓	ƛ̓	c	c̓	u	ū	w	x̣	x̣ʷ	y	ʔ
Practical
a	aa	c	cw	h	i	ii	k	kʼ	kw	kwʼ	l	lh	m	n	p	pʼ	q	qʼ	qw	qwʼ	s	t	tʼ	tlʼ	ts	tsʼ	u	uu	w	x	xw	y	7

- The trigraph lhh (APA łł) is used for /ɬː/, though not a part of the alphabet.
- The only word where ⟨cw⟩ = /çw/ and not /xʷ/ is icwappattsut 'to constantly turn one's head', from wapat 'to turn s.t. sideways'.
- The only word where ⟨xw⟩ = /χw/ and not /χʷ/ is reduplicated waxwaxtsya 'great-grandchildren'.
- Despite being written the same, /t͡s/ contrasts with /ts/ [tʰs] within morphemes, a trait Nuxalk shares with several other Salishan languages.
  - nutastsiik 'musket' = reduplicated tas 'to poke' + nu- -iik 'half, middle'
- Labialized dorsals (cw, kw, kwʼ, xw, qw, qwʼ) are spelled without w before u since labialization is not contrastive in that position.

Morpheme-initially, the glottal stop is spelled only:

- after prefixes:
  - kʼilh7itsa 'toothless' = kʼilh- '-less' + itsa 'tooth'
  - s7mtsta 'seat, chair' = s- nmz + mt 'to sit' + -sta 'tool, implement'
- in enclitics with initial 7a, 7i and 7l, which glottalize preceding stops:
  - wa qayt 7ats [...tʼæt͡s] 'these hats'
  - qaaxla 7isu! 'have another drink!'
  - wal 7lmitsʼ? 'who might it be now?'
- in the following terms:
  - 7na 'determinative'
  - 7lats 'sea cucumber'
  - 7yanahu 'turnip'
  - 7na 'forgotten'
  - 7nap 'to take'
  - 7nayc 'to accompany'

== Grammar ==
=== Typology ===
Nuxalk is a polysynthetic language with polypersonal agreement and split ergative alignment. Affix order in transitive events is usually verb–object–subject but verb–subject–object with a 2nd person object.

=== Events ===
The first element in a sentence expresses the event of the proposition. It inflects for the person and number of one (in the intransitive paradigm) or two (in the transitive paradigm) participants.

Single-participant event inflections
Person Number	1st	2nd	3rd
sg.	-ts¹²³	-nu¹²³	(-s)¹²³
pl.	-lh¹²/-ilh³	-nap¹²/-ap²³	-naw¹²/-aw²³

The raised numbers refer to three sub-paradigms: stems belonging to sub-paradigm 1 end in a non-nasal sonorant (a, i, u, y, w, l); sub-paradigm 2 stems end in a nasal (m, n); all stems ending in an obstruent belong to sub-paradigm 3. Absence or presence of 3 sg. -s is determined by context (see below), and sub-paradigm 2 -nap/-ap are in free variation, as are sub-paradigm 2 -naw/-aw.

Sub-paradigms
	1 'blow'	2 'capsize'	3 'work'
1sg.	apswats	plikmts	ksnm̠akts
2sg.	apswanu	plikm̠nu	ksnm̠aknu
3sg.	apswa(s)	plikm(s)	ksnm̠ak(s)
1pl.	apswalh	plikmlh	ksnm̠akilh
2pl.	apswanap	plikm̠nap/plikmap	ksnm̠akap
3pl.	apswanaw	plikm̠naw/plikmaw	ksnm̠akaw

As a possessive suffix, nominal -s is compulsory (when the possessor is explicit, it follows the ...-s phrase):

- tsi cnas-s 'his wife'
- ti tqʼlha-s 'his knife'
- ti kwtmts-s Mary 'Mary's husband'
- ti alhqulh-s ti mants tc 'my father's book'

In subordinate clauses, verbal -s is compulsory:

- maaskanmaak 7iks ska tsʼkt-s? 'at what time will he arrive?'
- wika ks wa amats s7apsulh-s? 'where does he live?'
- wic 7itsʼik sklh-s ti snx tʼayc 'and that's when the sun sets'
- wic txw stlʼap-s 'that's when he went'
- s7aymis sksnm̠ak-s 'he always works'
- kʼcim tsʼ stsic-s ilh 'now they saw that it was her'
- anayk tʼayc ska tlʼap-s 'he wants to go'
- tlʼiliwa s7mt-s 'he got up fast'
- yalhkayc tʼayc sxs-s 'this one is too fat'
- kaynucs ma ska putlʼ-s 'maybe he will come tomorrow'

On the inter-sentential level, verbal -s and -∅ ("zero suffix") differ in that -∅ introduces a new topic, while -s links topics. -∅ can be rendered as 'he/she (...)', and -s as '(...), and he/she (...)':

- Smsmayamkits ti Qwaxw tc n ti Tʼuka tc. Alh7ay-∅ kwsu ta Tʼuka tx ala kulhuuts.
  - 'I will tell a story about Raven and Mink. Well, Mink was doing things on a beach.'
- Us7atsyanmaw swntsʼlhtaw. Numawii-∅ kwʼilutsʼik ta Tlʼupana tx sputlʼaylaycs c a pʼwi.
  - 'They boarded the canoe and went halibut-fishing. Eventually, only Cormorant managed to catch some halibut.'
- Lhkwʼmim ta qiqti tx c ta tlʼmsta tx. Alh7ay-s tuu ta qiqti tx slhkwʼmis ta tlʼmsta tx.
  - 'The young boy was loved by the man. And the young boy, too, loved the man.'
- "Tsqm na," tsut kwʼitsʼik tʼayc. Tsqm-s kwtutuu tx.
  - '"Now open your mouth," he then said. And, indeed, he did open his mouth.'

The following are the possible person markers for transitive verbs, with empty cells indications non-occurring combinations and '--' identifying semantic combinations which require the reflexive suffix -tsut- followed by the appropriate intransitive suffix:

Two-participant event inflections
Transitive inflection			Experiencer:					
Transitive inflection			singular			plural		
Transitive inflection			1	2	3	1	2	3
Executor:	singular	1	–	-tsinu	-its		-tulhap	-tits
Executor:	singular	2	-tscw	–	-icw	-tulhnu		-ticw
Executor:	singular	3	-tss	-tst	-is	-tulhs	-tap	-tis
Executor:	plural	1		-tulhnu	-ilh	–	-tulhap	-tilh
Executor:	plural	2	-tsap		-ip	-tulhp	–	-tip
Executor:	plural	3	-tsant	-tst	-it	-tulht	-tap	-tit

E.g. spʼis ti imlk tc ti stn tc 'the man (imlk) struck (spʼ) the tree (stn)'.

Whether a word can serve as an event is not determined lexically, e.g. imlmllki-∅ ti nus7ulxmc tc 'the thief is a boy', nus7ulxmc-∅ ti qʼs tc 'the one who is ill (?) is a thief'.

There is a further causative paradigm whose suffixes may be used instead:

Causative paradigm
Transitive inflection			Experiencer:					
Transitive inflection			singular			plural		
Transitive inflection			1	2	3	1	2	3
Executor	singular	1	–	-tuminu	-tuts		-tumulhap	-tutits
Executor	singular	2	-tumcw	–	-tucw	-tumulhcw		-tuticw
Executor	singular	3	-tum	-tumt	-tus	-tumulhs	-tutap	-tutis
Executor	plural	1		-tumulhnu	-tulh	–	-tumulhap	-tutilh
Executor	plural	2	-tumanp		-tup	-tumulhp	–	-tutip
Executor	plural	3	-tumant	-tumt	-tut	-tumulht	-tutap	-tutit

This has a passive counterpart:

Passive Causative paradigm
Passive Causative	Singular	Plural
1st Person	-tuminits	-tuminilh
2nd Person	-tumt	-tutap
3rd Person	-tum	-tutim

This may also have a benefactive gloss when used with events involving less activity of their participant (e.g. nuyamlh-tus ti imlk tc ti imlmllki tc 'the man made/let the boy sing'/'the man sang for the boy'), while in events with more active participants only the causative gloss is possible. In the later group even more active verbs have a preference for the affix -lc- (implying passive experience) before the causative suffix.

The executor in a transitive sentence always precedes the experiencer. However, when an event is proceeded by a lone participant, the semantic content of the event determines whether the participant is an executor or an experiencer. This can only be determined syntactically if the participant is marked by the preposition ulh, which marks the experience.

Some events are inherently transitive or intransitive, but some may accept multiple valencies (e.g. anayk 'to be needy'/'to want [something]').

Prepositions may mark experiencers, and must mark implements. Any participants which are not marked by prepositions are focussed. There are three voices, which allow either the executor, the experiencer, or both to have focus:

- Active voice – neither is marked with prepositions.
- Passive voice – the event may have different suffixes, and the executor may be omitted or marked with a preposition
- Antipassive voice – the event is marked with the affix -a- before personal markers, and the experiencer is marked with a preposition

The affix -amk- (-yamk- after the antipassive marker -a-) allows an implement to have its preposition removed and to be focused. For example:

- nuyamlh-∅ ti man tc ulh ti mna-s tc c ti syut tc 'the father sang the song to his son'
- nuyamlh-amk-is ti man tc ti syut-tc ulh ti mna-s tc 'the father sang the song to his son'

=== Prepositions ===
In Nuxalk, a structured (location/direction-specific) class of prepositions has evolved. These are of a proclitical nature. Diachronically considered, the "static" ones can be shown to go back to earlier Salish, while the "dynamic" ones are innovative.

Prepositions
	Static	Dynamic
Centripetal	alh 'at'	ulh 'towards'
Centrifugal	c 'via'	...clhh 'away from'

- ...clhh always co-occurs with ti- 'non-female', tsi- 'female', or wi- 'plural'.

Prepositions appear in adjuncts:

- ksnmakts alh Nuxalk 'I work in Bella Coola'
- tlʼapts ulh Tsʼaamas 'I am going to Victoria'
- spʼiixwis ta imlk tx ta watsʼ tx c ta stn 'the man hit the dog with a stick'
- alhkʼctx wiclhh tʼaxw! 'look at it from over there!'

=== Deixis ===
Nuxalk has a set of deictic prefixes and suffixes which serve to identify items as instantiations of domains rather than domains themselves and to locate them in deictic space. Thus the sentences watsʼ-∅ ti tlʼikm tc and ti watsʼ-∅ ti tlʼikm tc, both 'the one that's running (tlʼikm) is a dog (watsʼ)', are slightly different – similar to the difference between the English sentences 'the visitor is Canadian' and 'the visitor is a Canadian' respectively.

The deixis system has a proximal/medial/distal and a non-demonstrative/demonstrative distinction. Demonstratives may be used when finger pointing would be appropriate (or in distal space when something previously mentioned is being referred to).

Proximal demonstrative space roughly corresponds to the area of conversation, and proximal non-demonstrative may be viewed as the area in which one could attract another's attention without raising one's voice. Visible space beyond this is middle demonstrative, space outside of this but within the invisible neighborhood is medial non-demonstrative. Everything else is distal, and non-demonstrative if not mentioned earlier.

The deictic prefixes and suffixes are as follows:

Deictic suffixes
Deictic Suffixes	Proximal		Medial		Distal	
Deictic Suffixes	Non-Demon- strative	Demon- strative	Non-Demon- strative	Demon- strative	Non-Demon- strative	Demon- strative
Masculine	-tc	-tʼayc	-lh	-tʼax	-tx	-tax
Feminine	-tsc	-tsʼayc	-lh	-7ilh7aylh	-7ilh	-7ilh
Plural	-ts	-7ats	-lh	-tʼaxw	-txw	-tux

Female affixes are used only when the particular is singular and identified as female; if not, even if the particular is inanimate, masculine or plural is used.

The deictic prefixes only have a proximal vs. non-proximal distinction, and no demonstrative distinction:

Deictic prefixes
Deictic Prefixes	Proximal	Medial and Distal
Masculine	ti-	ta-
Feminine	tsi-	lha- (7ilh-)
Plural	wa-	ta- (tu-)

tu- is used in earlier varieties and some types of narratives, except for middle non-demonstrative, and the variant 7ilh- may be used "in the same collection of deictic space".

While events are not explicitly marked for tense per se, deixis plays a strong role in determining when the proposition is being asserted to occur. So in a sentence like mus-is ti imlmllkii tc ta qʼlscw tʼax 'the boy (imlmllkii) felt (mus) that rope (qʼlscw)', the sentence is perceived as having a near-past (same day) interpretation, as the boy cannot be touching the rope in middle space from proximal space. However this does not hold for some events, like kʼc 'to see'.

A distal suffix on any participant lends the event a distant past interpretation (before the past day), a medial suffix and no distal suffix lends a near past time, and if the participants are marked as proximal the time is present.

Not every distal participant occurs in past-tense sentences, and vice versa—rather, the deictic suffixes must either represent positions in space, time, or both.

=== Pronouns ===
Pronouns
	sg.	pl.
1st	nts	lhmilh
2nd	inu	lhup

These can be used as a predicate, argument, or member of a prepositional phrase:

- nts ti staltmc 'I am the chief (staltmc)'
- inu tsi cnasts 'you are my wife (cnas)'
- kamalh nts ti ka smlhk 'if (kamalh) I were a fish (smlhk)'

The difference between predicative pronouns and intransitive pronominal suffixes is one of emphasis: staltmcts 'I am a chief' vs. nts ti staltmc 'I am the chief (nobody else is)'.

Pronouns are intransitive stative verbs ('to be me/us/you'):

- in embedded and negative sentences, nts and inu take the ending -s:
  - axw inus ta mnats 'my son (mna) is not you' = 'you are not my son'
- pronouns can be nominalized with s-:
  - alh ti s7inus tc 'on (alh) its being you' = 'on your own'
- pronouns allow limited non-personal suffixation:
  - nts 7lks ta wa? 'it is me beyond my knowledge (7lks) is somebody?' = 'who am I?'

Three elements serve to introduce one or more person(s) or object(s) other than the speaker(s) or addressee(s). These, the identifiers, are:

Identifiers
	sg.	pl.
Female	tsic	wic
Non-f.	tic	wic

Like the pronouns, identifiers pattern as intransitive stative verbs ('to be identical to, the same as'), and can be used predicatively. But unlike pronouns, identifiers can be followed by a "double subject", i.e. (1) the subject proper (the identified person(s) or thing(s)) and (2) the subject's role or function (predicate nominative):

- tic tʼayc ti mants 'this (tʼayc) is my father (man)'
- tsic tsi suuxinu lha kslhtcw 'it is your younger sister (suuxi) who has done (kstu-) it'
- wic ats wa nupts 'these (ats) are my shirts (nup)'

In allegro and informal speech, identifiers are often omitted, in which case the sentence-initial nominal phrase functions as the predicate: tʼayc ti mants, tsi suuxinu lha kslhtcw, ats wa nupts.

=== Numerals ===
Nuxalk numbers and numerical substitutes are, morpho-syntactically considered, of an adjectival nature. With the exception of smaw 'one', all numbers and the numerical substitutes slax 'numerous', acwlh 'some', tscwi 'enough', tsaatsii 'few', tsay 'all' are Salish in origin, while cs 'entire' (root), kp 'each, every', kʼacw 'none', tsatsaslhqʼ 'so many' have no known etymologies.

The numerical system is mostly decimal but vigesimal in the range 10-100: multiples of 20 are formed with the suffix -lxs, while e.g. 120 would be (5 x 20) + 20 instead of 6 x 20.

The numbers kʼilhnus (8) and kʼismaw (9) are prefixed with kʼilh-/kʼis- 'lacking', being derived from '(ten) minus two' and '(ten) minus one' respectively. A similar situation can be observed in the Finnic languages.

1-10
1	smaw
2	lhnus
3	asmus
4	mus
5	tsʼicw
6	tʼxulh
7	nus7alhklhm
8	kʼilhnus
9	kʼismaw
10	tsʼklakt

11-20
11	tsʼklakt putlʼs ti smaw
12	tsʼklakt putlʼs a lhnus
13	tsʼklakt putlʼs a asmus
14	tsʼklakt putlʼs a mus
15	tsʼklakt putlʼs a tsʼicw
16	tsʼklakt putlʼs a tʼxulh
17	tsʼklakt putlʼs a nus7alhklhm
18	tsʼklakt putlʼs a kʼilhnus
19	tsʼklakt putlʼs a kʼismaw
20	mawlxs

10-100
10	tsʼklakt
20	mawlxs
30	mawlxs putlʼs a tsʼklakt
40	lhwaaslxs
50	lhwaaslxs putlʼs a tsʼklakt
60	asmuslxs
70	asmuslxs putlʼs a tsʼklakt
80	muslxs
90	muslxs putlʼs a tsʼklakt
100	tsʼicwlxs

100-1000
100	tsʼicwlxs
200	lhnusam tsʼicwlxs
300	asmusam tsʼicwlxs
400	musam tsʼicwlxs
500	tsʼicwam tsʼicwlxs
600	tʼxulham tsʼicwlxs
700	nus7alhklhmam tsʼicwlxs
800	kʼilhnusam tsʼicwlxs
900	kʼismawam tsʼicwlxs
1000	tsʼklaktam tsʼicwlxs

=== Particles ===
Particles
Particle	Label	Gloss
kw	Quotative	'he said'
ma	Dubitative	'maybe'
7alu	Attemptive	'try'
tsk	Inferential Dubitative	'I figure'
tsakw	Optative	'I wish/hope'
su	Expectable	'again'
tu	Confirmative	'really'
ku	Surprisative	'so'
lu	Expective	'expected'
a	Interrogative	[yes/no questions]
tsʼ	Perfective	'now'
tsʼn	Imperfective	'now'
kwʼ	Usitative	'usually'
mas	Absolutive	'always'
ks	Individuative	'the one'
lhuu	Persistive	'still, yet'
tuu	Non-contrastive conjunction	'and'
7i...k	Contrastive conjunction	'but'

== See also ==
- Coast Salish languages
- Interior Salish

== Bibliography ==
- Bell, Alan; Hooper, Joan B. (1978). Syllables and segments. North-Holland Pub. Co. ISBN 0444852417. OL 4733334M.
- Bagemihl, Bruce (1991a). "Syllable Structure in Bella Coola". Proceedings of the North East Linguistics Society. 21: 16–30. hdl:20.500.14394/36612.
- Bhat, D.N.S. (2004). Pronouns. Oxford: Oxford University Press.
- Hoard, James (1978). "Syllabification in Northwest Indian Languages". In Bell; Bybee-Hooper (eds.). Syllables and Segments. pp. 67–68.
- Davis, Philip W.; Saunders, Ross (1997). A Grammar of Bella Coola. University of Montana Occasional Papers in Linguistics. Vol. 13. Missoula, MT: University of Montana. ISBN 1-879763-13-3.
- Nater, Hank F. (1979). "Bella Coola Phonology". Lingua. 49 (2–3): 169–187. doi:10.1016/0024-3841(79)90022-6.
- Nater, Hank F. (1984). The Bella Coola Language. Mercury Series, Canadian Ethnology Service. Vol. 92. Ottawa: National Museums of Canada. OL 2578559M.
- Nater, Hank (16 January 2022). "The Nuxalk Language : (lexicon, narratives, grammar)". ScienceOpen Preprints. doi:10.14293/S2199-1006.1.SOR-.PPC20XL.v1.
- Nater, Hank (2024). Reisinger, D. K. E.; Griffin, Laura; Hannon, Ella; Mellesmoen, Gloria; Nederveen, Sander; Oliver, Bruce; Schillo, Julia; Schneider, Lauren; Trotter, Bailey (eds.). Voiceless Words in Bella Coola: Fact vs. Fiction (PDF). ICSNL 59. Papers for the International Conference on Salish and Neighbouring Languages 59. Vancouver, BC. pp. 411–422.
- Nater, Hank (12 March 2026). All-Obstruent Words in Bella Coola: Phonotactics, Diachrony, Geography.
