= South Bentinck =

Settlement in British Columbia, Canada

Coordinates: 52°02′40″N 126°40′00″W

South Bentinck is a locality on South Bentinck Arm in the Central Coast region of British Columbia, Canada, located on the north side of the mouth of the Noeick River on the east shore of that inlet.

== See also ==
- List of communities in British Columbia
