= Noeick River =

River in British Columbia

Coordinates: 52°02′28″N 126°40′26″W

The Noeick River is a river in the Central Coast region of British Columbia, Canada, flowing west out of the northernmost Pacific Ranges to enter saltwater on the east side of South Bentinck Arm, immediately to the north of the mouth of the Taleomey River at Taleomey Narrows.

The locality of South Bentinck is located at the river's mouth. There was a Nuxalk village, Nuiku, on a raised mound south of the mouth of the Noieck River. Another village, Kadis, was on the east side of South Bentinck Arm about ¼-mile north of the mouth of the Noieck.

The river originates at the Noeick Glacier, which is to the northwest of Mount Jacobsen.

== See also ==
- List of rivers of British Columbia
