= North Bentinck Arm =

Inlet in the country of Canada

North Bentinck Arm is a short inlet about 17 km (11 mi) in length in the Central Coast region of British Columbia, Canada. It is an arm of Burke Channel and is linked via that waterway and Labouchere Channel to Dean Channel, which is one of the largest inlets of the BC Coast.

North Bentinck Arm is historically significant as the location where North West Company explorer Alexander MacKenzie reached the waters of the Pacific Ocean overland from Lake Athabasca via the Peace and Fraser Rivers, on 20 July 1793. Needing to find an open area to make an astronomical sighting, using the moons of the planet Jupiter to determine his longitude, he went by canoe with four Nuxalk natives the next day to Dean Channel, stopping at a site now part of Sir Alexander Mackenzie Provincial Park. A boulder on the shoreline there is marked with "Alexander MacKenzie, from Canada by land 22d July 1793". By only a few weeks MacKenzie missed meeting James Johnstone, one of Captain George Vancouver's men, who also visited North Bentinck Arm that year.

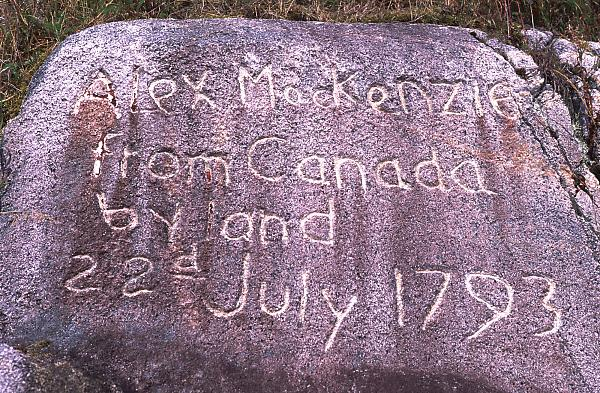
Inscription at the end of the Alexander Mackenzie's Canada crossing located at 52°22′43″N 127°28′14″W

== Name origin ==
North and South Bentinck Arms were named by George Vancouver, as "Bentinck Arms", in 1793, after the House of Portland; the Duke of Portland at the time was William Henry Cavendish Bentinck.

== Indigenous territory ==
The inlet is the territory of the Nuxalk Nation, whose main community adjoins the town of Bella Coola, which is at the head of the inlet. The Nuxalk are also known as the Bella Coola people.

== See also ==
- Alexander MacKenzie Heritage Trail
