= Stuie =

Coordinates: 52°22′11″N 126°03′53″W

Stuie is an unincorporated community in the Bella Coola Valley of the Central Coast Regional District in British Columbia, Canada. It is situated at the confluence of the Atnarko River and Talchako River, where the Bella Coola River begins, and lies east of Hagensborg in Range 3 Coast Land District. The site was historically the location of the Nuxalk village of Stwic and has ancestral connections with Ulkatcho and Tsilhqot'in families.

== Geography and transportation ==
Stuie is located at the junction of the Atnarko and Talchako rivers, where the two rivers form the Bella Coola River. A 1932 account in the Canadian Alpine Journal placed Stuie about 40 miles (64 km) inland from Bella Coola and approximately 600 feet (180 m) above sea level. It referred to the Talchako, then called the White Water River, as joining the Atnarko at Stuie.

Stuie lies along British Columbia Highway 20, also known as the Chilcotin-Bella Coola Highway. The highway crosses the Coast Mountains between the Bella Coola Valley and the Interior Plateau, providing the principal road connection between the valley and the British Columbia Interior. A road connecting the Bella Coola Valley with the Interior was completed in 1953; before its construction, Indigenous trails provided important routes between the coast and the Interior.

The surrounding area formed part of a longstanding network of Indigenous travel and trade routes. Routes known as grease trails connected the Bella Coola Valley with the Interior Plateau and were used to exchange goods including eulachon grease, furs and obsidian. The route east from Stuie followed an older Indigenous trail toward the Interior; its continued use was noted by the Canadian Alpine Journal in 1932.

== Name ==
The site was historically the location of the Nuxalk village of Stwic, also recorded in historical sources as Stuwic and Stuik.

Englishman Tommy Walker, who later established Stuie Lodge, recorded a story in which a wolf carried a small box-like object into the valley. According to Walker's account, the object was dropped at a place where the mountains were farther apart and transformed into a house, forming the beginnings of the village of Stooick. Walker gave the name as meaning "a pleasing place of repose" or "a quiet place".

The modern name Stuie is recorded by the British Columbia Geographical Names Office as an official community name. The office notes that historical origin information for the name has not yet been transferred from its paper records and maps to the online database.

== Indigenous history ==
The Ulkatcho First Nation identifies Stwic as one of its former Nuxalk villages and records ancestral relationships between Ulkatcho and Tsilhqot'in families and the Nuxalk of Stwic. According to an account published by the Ulkatcho First Nation, the Clellamin family's ancestral origins are at Stwic and Chief Tl’alamn was buried there.

The area formed part of a wider network of Indigenous settlements, trails and trading routes connecting the Bella Coola Valley with the Interior. BC Parks states that the Nuxalk and Carrier First Nations have used the park and surrounding area for thousands of years, and that grease trails enabled interior peoples to trade furs and obsidian for coastal products such as eulachon grease.

Archaeological surveys have documented numerous Indigenous sites in the Bella Coola Valley. A survey of the valley's waterways conducted in 1977 extended from the mouth of the Bella Coola River as far as Stuie and recorded two dozen archaeological sites, including a pictograph, a canoe, three village mounds, two fish weirs, a quarry, a culturally modified tree site, seven cultural depressions and eight lithic scatters.

Indigenous use of the site continued into the period of early Euro-Canadian settlement. A 1932 account in the Canadian Alpine Journal described Stuie as consisting of a summer Indigenous encampment alongside a hunting lodge then being completed by two Englishmen, Arnold and Walker.

== Stuie Lodge ==
In 1929, Tommy Walker purchased land at Stuie after seeing its location on a map. He established a wilderness outfitting operation there and built Stuie Lodge in 1931.

The lodge was under construction by 1932. The Canadian Alpine Journal described a hunting lodge at Stuie being completed by Arnold and Walker and noted that the pair had built a trail from the lodge into the surrounding mountain country. A contemporary account published by the American Alpine Club similarly described Stuie as a summer Indigenous encampment where a hunting lodge was being completed by Arnold and Walker.

Stuie Lodge became a base for hunting, fishing, mountaineering and other wilderness activities. Its location at the junction of the Atnarko and Talchako rivers provided access to the surrounding valleys and mountains.

== Tweedsmuir and the development of the area ==
Walker became involved in the development of trails in the region during the 1930s. In 1937, the Canadian Alpine Journal reported that Walker, then proprietor of Stuie Lodge, was away in the mountains working on trail construction in preparation for the visit of Lord Tweedsmuir, the Governor General of Canada, to Tweedsmuir Park and the Bella Coola Valley.

Tweedsmuir and his wife visited the region in August 1937. Tweedsmuir Provincial Park was established on May 21, 1938, by Order in Council 715 and was named for Lord Tweedsmuir.

Stuie Lodge subsequently became known as Tweedsmuir Lodge. An account published in the Canadian Alpine Journal in 1942–43 referred to it as "Stuie Lodge, now known as Tweedsmuir Lodge". The British Columbia Geographical Names Office records that the name Tweedsmuir Peak was adopted following the Tweedsmuir Park expedition of August 1937.

== Later history ==
Walker sold the lodge to Colonel Corbould in 1948. The original lodge was destroyed by fire in 1953, after which Corbould constructed a second lodge on the property.

The lodge continued operating under the Tweedsmuir name and remained associated with wilderness tourism in the Bella Coola Valley. The property changed ownership again in 2008, after which improvements were made to the lodge and its facilities.

== Climate ==
Climate data for Stuie (Tweedsmuir Lodge), 1981–2010
Month	Jan	Feb	Mar	Apr	May	Jun	Jul	Aug	Sep	Oct	Nov	Dec	Year
Record high °C (°F)	16.5 (61.7)	17.0 (62.6)	26.5 (79.7)	31.1 (88.0)	33.5 (92.3)	38.0 (100.4)	42.8 (109.0)	37.5 (99.5)	33.9 (93.0)	26.1 (79.0)	18.3 (64.9)	18.9 (66.0)	42.8 (109.0)
Mean daily maximum °C (°F)	0.7 (33.3)	4.6 (40.3)	9.6 (49.3)	15.9 (60.6)	20.0 (68.0)	22.7 (72.9)	25.2 (77.4)	24.8 (76.6)	20.3 (68.5)	12.5 (54.5)	4.4 (39.9)	0.6 (33.1)	13.4 (56.2)
Daily mean °C (°F)	−1.9 (28.6)	0.6 (33.1)	4.3 (39.7)	9.1 (48.4)	12.9 (55.2)	15.9 (60.6)	18.4 (65.1)	18.0 (64.4)	14.0 (57.2)	8.0 (46.4)	1.8 (35.2)	−1.7 (28.9)	8.3 (46.9)
Mean daily minimum °C (°F)	−4.5 (23.9)	−3.4 (25.9)	−1.1 (30.0)	2.3 (36.1)	5.7 (42.3)	9.1 (48.4)	11.5 (52.7)	11.1 (52.0)	7.6 (45.7)	3.6 (38.5)	−0.9 (30.4)	−4.0 (24.8)	3.1 (37.6)
Record low °C (°F)	−27.2 (−17.0)	−27.2 (−17.0)	−19.0 (−2.2)	−13.9 (7.0)	−2.8 (27.0)	0.5 (32.9)	3.3 (37.9)	3.3 (37.9)	−3.3 (26.1)	−12.2 (10.0)	−27.5 (−17.5)	−25.0 (−13.0)	−27.5 (−17.5)
Average precipitation mm (inches)	99.3 (3.91)	64.8 (2.55)	52.9 (2.08)	38.3 (1.51)	32.6 (1.28)	30.5 (1.20)	24.2 (0.95)	30.1 (1.19)	52.8 (2.08)	119.2 (4.69)	147.7 (5.81)	100.6 (3.96)	793 (31.21)
Average snowfall cm (inches)	35.0 (13.8)	25.3 (10.0)	6.9 (2.7)	0.4 (0.2)	0.0 (0.0)	0.0 (0.0)	0.0 (0.0)	0.0 (0.0)	0.0 (0.0)	0.9 (0.4)	33.7 (13.3)	45.1 (17.8)	147.3 (58.2)
Average precipitation days (≥ 0.2 mm)	15.6	10.6	13.0	10.6	11.6	11.2	9.7	9.9	12.1	18.1	18.8	15.9	157.1
Average snowy days (≥ 0.2 cm)	9.3	5.1	2.4	0.27	0.0	0.0	0.0	0.0	0.0	0.43	6.4	10.1	34
Source: Environment and Climate Change Canada
