= Nuxalk Nation =

First Nation in British Columbia, Canada

- Band No. 539
- People: Nuxalk people
- Headquarters: Bella Coola
- Province: British Columbia

Land
- Main reserve: Bella Coola Indian Reserve No. 1
- Land area: 20.3 km^{2} (7.8 sq mi)

Population (2024)
- On reserve: 917
- On other land: 41
- Off reserve: 872
- Total population: 1830

Government
- Chief: Samuel
- Council: Schooner

Tribal Council
- Wuikinuxv-Kitasoo-Nuxalk Tribal Council

Website
- nuxalknation.ca

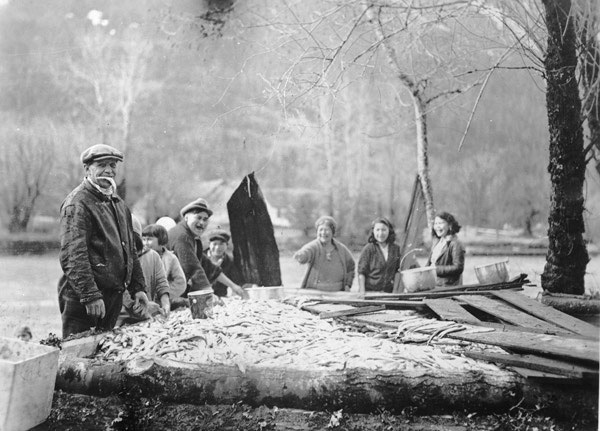
Nuxalk People gathered around a eulachan stink box

The Nuxalk Nation is the band government of the Nuxalk people of Bella Coola, British Columbia. It is a member of the Wuikinuxv-Kitasoo-Nuxalk Tribal Council, and until March 2008 was a member of the Unrepresented Nations and Peoples Organization.

== Etymology ==
Nuxalkmc is formed from Nuxalk "Bella Coola Valley" and -mc "population, inhabitant, native".

== Community ==
Qʼumkʼuts, a Nuxalk community located at the confluence of the Bella Coola River and the Pacific Ocean, is currently home to the majority of the Nuxalk population. It is located in the Bella Coola Valley, in British Columbia. It is on the Nation's primary reserve (which is much smaller than the Nation's traditional territory), adjacent to the Bella Coola "townsite", the Central business district for the Valley. Nuxalk Hall is a community center, where potlatches and social events are held. The Nuxalk Basketball Association hosts games in the hall.

The Nuxalkmc were wrongfully categorized as Coast Salish. Today the Nuxalkmc are classified under their own distinct category.

== Language ==
The Nuxalk Nation traditionally has spoken the Nuxalk language. Today there are an estimated 5 fluent speakers, 80 conversational speakers, and 140 learning speakers. Nuxalk-language radio programming and work towards an expanded Nuxalk-English dictionary and a new online phrasebook started in 2014.

== History ==
Located at the mouth of the Bella Coola River, the nation was only accessible by foot, air, or boat until 1953, when a road was constructed. Nuxalk people have lived in the region for millennia. Norwegian people settled in the area in the 1890s. It is estimated the population of the Nuxalkmc people were in the thousands amongst different villages. Stories suggest there were approximately ten thousand to thirty thousand spanning the whole Bella Coola Valley and surrounding inlets.

In February 2023, a Nuxalk Nation totem pole was returned to the nation by the Royal British Columbia Museum. The totem pole was stolen from the nation in 1913 and sold to the museum for $45.

== Ethnobotany ==
The Nuxalk apply a poultice of pounded roots of Ranunculus acris to boils. They take a decoction of Antennaria howellii leaves for body pain, but not pain in the limbs.

A full list of their ethnobotany can be found at http://naeb.brit.org/uses/tribes/21/ (387 documented plant uses).

== Notable people ==
- Banchi Hanuse, film maker
- Inez Cook, author

== See also ==
- Nuxalk language
- Fort McLoughlin
