= Atnarko River =

River in British Columbia, Canada

Coordinates: 52°22′N 126°6′W

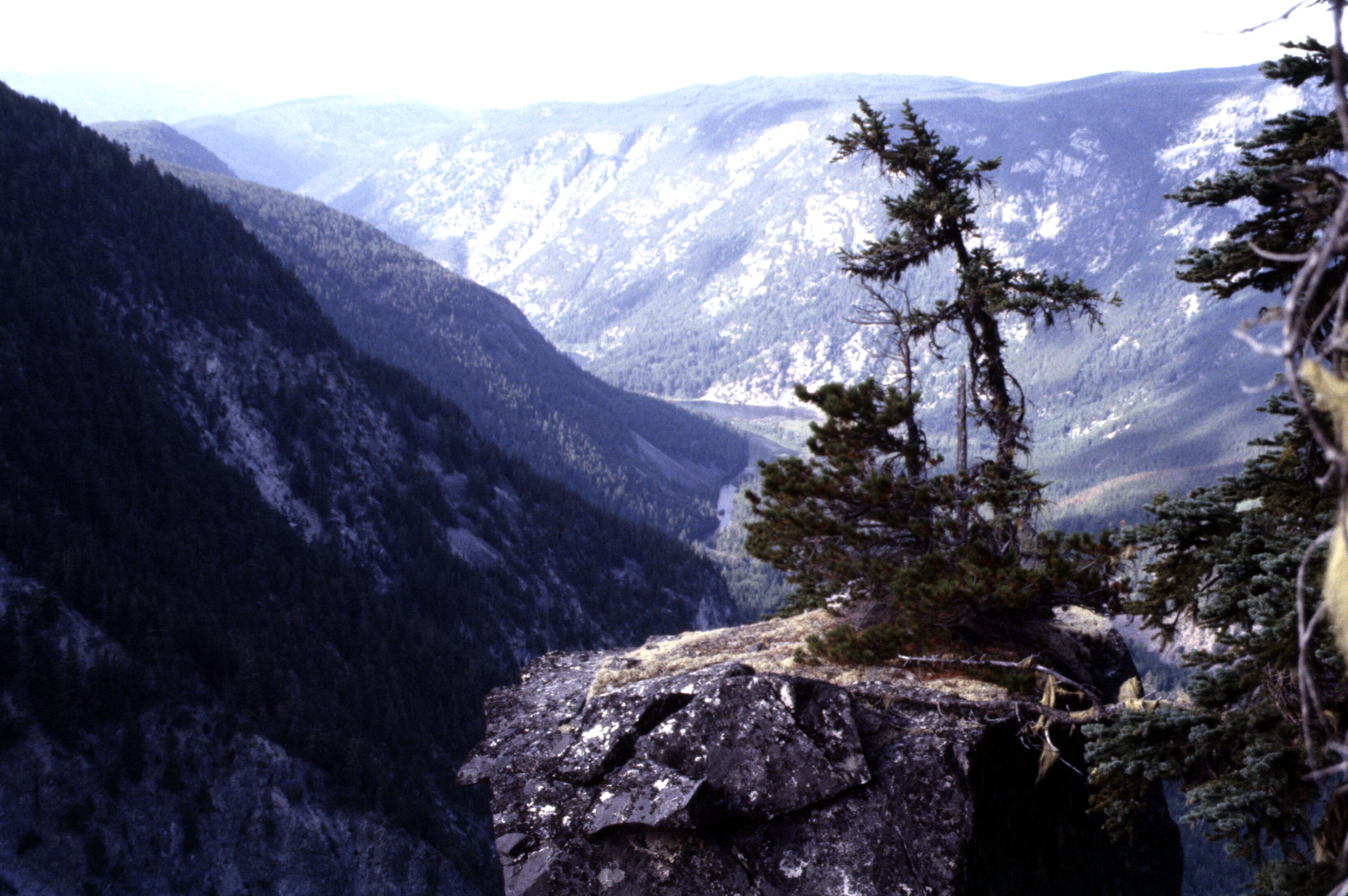
The Atnarko Valley of the Atnarko River

Atnarko River is a river in the Canadian province of British Columbia.

== Course ==
The Atnarko River flows originates at Charlotte Lake. It flows generally west for approximately 100 kilometres (62 mi), joining the Telchako River to form the Bella Coola River. For much of its length the river flows through Tweedsmuir South Provincial Park.

== See also ==
- List of rivers of British Columbia
