= Bella Coola, British Columbia =

Town in British Columbia, Canada

Bella Coola
- Unincorporated community
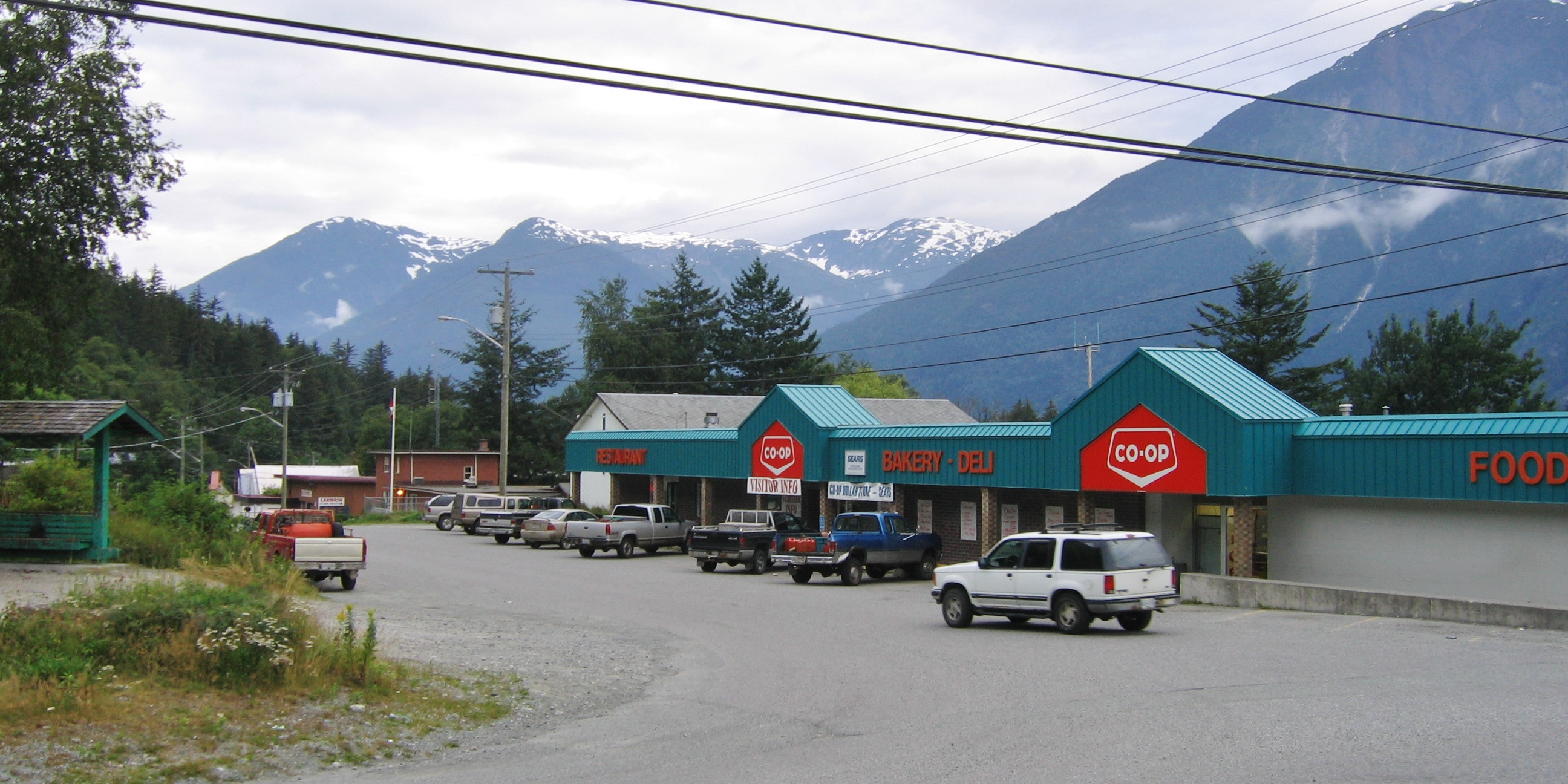
- Bella Coola Consumers Co-op

- Location within British Columbia
- Coordinates: 52°22′N 126°45′W
- Country: Canada
- Province: British Columbia
- Regional district: Central Coast

Population
  - Total: 2,163
- Highways: Highway 20
- Website: bellacoola.ca

Bella Coola is an unincorporated community in the Bella Coola Valley of British Columbia, Canada. Bella Coola usually refers to the entire valley, encompassing the settlements of Bella Coola proper ("the townsite"), Lower Bella Coola, Hagensborg, Salloompt, Nusatsum, Firvale, and Stuie. It is also the location of the head offices of the Central Coast Regional District.

The entire Bella Coola Valley has a population of 2,163 as of the 2021 census. This was an increase of 8% from the 2016 census, when the population was 2,007.

== Geography ==
The primary geographical structure of the community, both in terms of physical structures and population distribution, is the long, narrow Bella Coola River valley. The river meanders along the eastern and northern edges of the town before discharging into the head of North Bentinck Arm.

Highway 20 (known over most of its length as the Chilcotin Highway) stretches from the Government wharf (on the Pacific Ocean) through the extent of the populated portion of the valley before climbing to the Chilcotin Plateau, and the entire population of the community lives either on this road or very near to it.

In recent years, the mountainous terrain around and accessible from the Bella Coola Valley has been advertised for heliskiing. The Bella Coola has been ranked as having the World's Best Heliskiing Operation since 2017, and has held this title consistently every year since. Several skiing movies have been filmed in the area. The nearby Clayton Falls Creek provides public access to the North Bentinck Arm for the community.

== Name ==
"Bella Coola" is an exonym and corruption of the Heiltsuk bḷ́xʷlá, meaning "somebody from Bella Coola" or "stranger". The Nuxalk endonym for the local region is "Nuxalk", and the endonym for the specific village site of Bella Coola is "Q'umk'uts" The name Bella Coola has been used to refer to the entire Bella Coola valley, and at times to the entire ethnic region, not to any village in particular. Increasingly the term "Nuxalk Territory" is used for the entire region, and Bella Coola refers specifically to the river valley. Sir Alexander Mackenzie referred to it as 'Rascal's Village'.

== Climate ==
Bella Coola's climate is a moderate oceanic climate (Köppen Cfb) due to its proximity to the Pacific Ocean, falling exactly on the borderline with the warm-summer humid continental climate (Köppen Dfb) and close to the warm-summer Mediterranean climate (Köppen Csb) and the warm-summer continental Mediterranean climate (Köppen Dsb). However, its summers are warmer than coastal places much farther south due to its semi-inland position. The maritime air is made warmer by the passage of the outer islands, but is stronger in terms of winter moderation. This results in a climate that far belies its northerly latitude in North America. There is a strong drying tendency in summer, but remains above the dry-summer climates that are often referred to as cs climates (mediterranean).

The highest temperature ever recorded in Bella Coola was 41.2 °C (106.2 °F) on 30 July 2009. The coldest temperature ever recorded was −28.9 °C (−20 °F) on 15 January 1950.

Climate data for Bella Coola Airport, 1981–2010 normals, extremes 1895–present
Month	Jan	Feb	Mar	Apr	May	Jun	Jul	Aug	Sep	Oct	Nov	Dec	Year
Record high humidex	15.3	16.6	23.0	28.5	36.0	37.0	42.7	39.1	33.7	26.4	14.9	13.6	42.7
Record high °C (°F)	18.9 (66.0)	17.3 (63.1)	25.0 (77.0)	29.4 (84.9)	37.8 (100.0)	36.3 (97.3)	41.2 (106.2)	37.8 (100.0)	33.3 (91.9)	25.0 (77.0)	20.0 (68.0)	16.0 (60.8)	41.2 (106.2)
Mean daily maximum °C (°F)	3.0 (37.4)	5.9 (42.6)	9.9 (49.8)	14.3 (57.7)	18.1 (64.6)	20.7 (69.3)	23.0 (73.4)	22.7 (72.9)	18.7 (65.7)	12.2 (54.0)	5.5 (41.9)	2.4 (36.3)	13.0 (55.4)
Daily mean °C (°F)	0.2 (32.4)	2.1 (35.8)	5.0 (41.0)	8.6 (47.5)	12.1 (53.8)	15.1 (59.2)	17.3 (63.1)	17.0 (62.6)	13.4 (56.1)	8.3 (46.9)	2.8 (37.0)	0.0 (32.0)	8.5 (47.3)
Mean daily minimum °C (°F)	−2.6 (27.3)	−1.8 (28.8)	0.1 (32.2)	2.9 (37.2)	6.1 (43.0)	9.5 (49.1)	11.4 (52.5)	11.2 (52.2)	8.0 (46.4)	4.3 (39.7)	0.1 (32.2)	−2.4 (27.7)	3.9 (39.0)
Record low °C (°F)	−28.9 (−20.0)	−24.4 (−11.9)	−20.6 (−5.1)	−9.4 (15.1)	−6.1 (21.0)	−1.1 (30.0)	1.1 (34.0)	−1.1 (30.0)	−4.4 (24.1)	−14.0 (6.8)	−24.5 (−12.1)	−24.4 (−11.9)	−28.9 (−20.0)
Record low wind chill	−32.7	−36.8	−26.2	−9.7	0.0	0.0	0.0	0.0	−2.6	−21.8	−39.4	−30.6	−39.4
Average precipitation mm (inches)	157.2 (6.19)	87.6 (3.45)	76.4 (3.01)	55.7 (2.19)	47.8 (1.88)	51.1 (2.01)	42.3 (1.67)	60.3 (2.37)	90.1 (3.55)	194.9 (7.67)	204.9 (8.07)	130.8 (5.15)	1,199.1 (47.21)
Average rainfall mm (inches)	131.1 (5.16)	72.4 (2.85)	71.2 (2.80)	55.2 (2.17)	47.8 (1.88)	51.1 (2.01)	42.3 (1.67)	60.3 (2.37)	90.1 (3.55)	193.1 (7.60)	180.4 (7.10)	102.8 (4.05)	1,097.8 (43.22)
Average snowfall cm (inches)	30.3 (11.9)	17.2 (6.8)	5.7 (2.2)	0.6 (0.2)	0.0 (0.0)	0.0 (0.0)	0.0 (0.0)	0.0 (0.0)	0.0 (0.0)	2.2 (0.9)	26.0 (10.2)	30.1 (11.9)	112.0 (44.1)
Average precipitation days (≥ 0.2 mm)	18.2	13.3	16.1	14.7	15.7	15.8	13.4	12.9	14.6	21.1	21.1	18.3	195.1
Average rainy days (≥ 0.2 mm)	14.8	11.6	15.5	14.7	15.7	15.8	13.4	12.9	14.6	21.0	19.5	14.9	184.3
Average snowy days (≥ 0.2 cm)	6.0	3.5	1.5	0.3	0.0	0.0	0.0	0.0	0.0	0.4	4.4	7.0	23.1
Average relative humidity (%)	78.5	65.5	55.9	50.3	50.3	53.5	53.3	56.0	61.9	72.9	82.4	82.4	63.6
Mean monthly sunshine hours	16.8	68.8	119.6	160.2	203.7	198.2	231.8	206.8	156.6	80.8	20.2	7.8	1,471.4
Percentage possible sunshine	6.5	24.6	32.6	38.4	41.8	39.5	46.0	45.4	41.1	24.5	7.7	3.2	29.3

== Transport ==
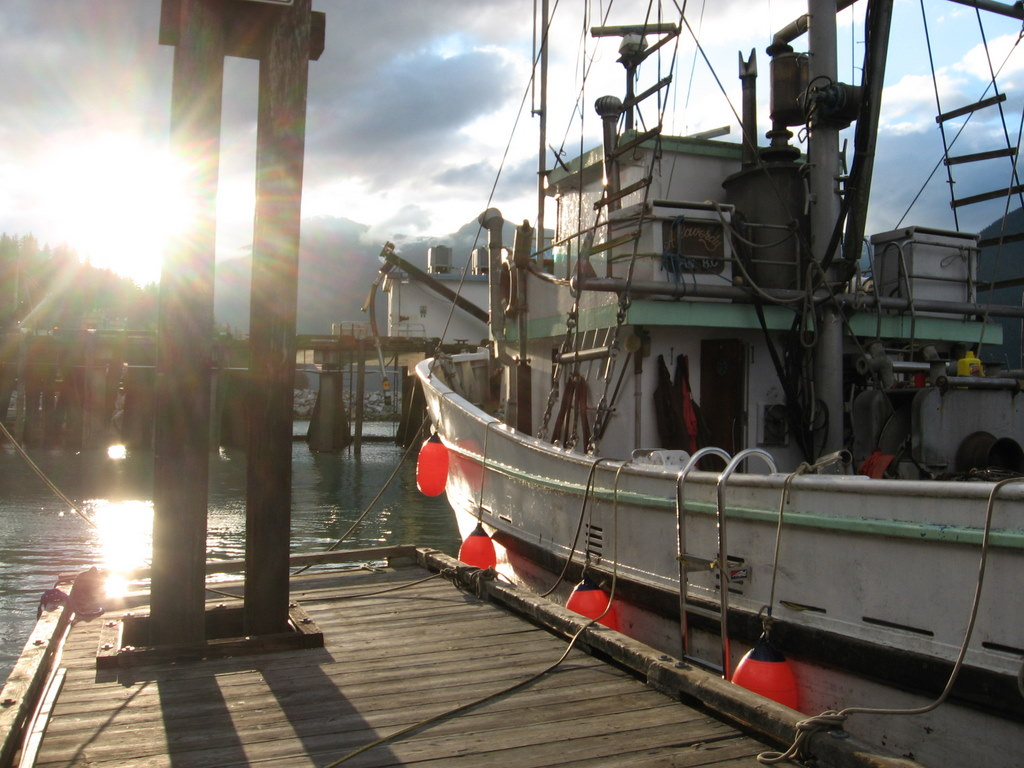
The wharf at Bella Coola

=== Road ===
There is a 454-km mostly paved road connection by Highway 20 to Williams Lake. The 137 kilometre section from Bella Coola to Anahim Lake was built in 1953 by local residents, and features a 15-km ascent from the Valley floor to the Chilcotin plateau, gaining 1600 metres in elevation to the summit at Heckman Pass, via a number of steep grades & switchbacks. The construction of this road was described in the books "Bella Coola" and "A Road Runs West".

=== Air ===
Bella Coola is served by the Bella Coola Airport (on Highway 20, in Hagensborg), 14 km distant from the townsite which has a 1,280-metre runway made of asphalt. Pacific Coastal Airlines offers scheduled traffic to Vancouver and Anahim Lake. Charter services by both plane and helicopter are also available.

=== Marine ferry ===
BC Ferries provides service from Bella Coola. Since its re-establishment in 1998, this service has connected to Bella Bella, and usually to Port Hardy on Vancouver Island, with various other intermediate destinations served at different times. Currently (2023), using the vessel Northern Sea Wolf, the service includes regular (once per week or more often) voyages to Port Hardy (Bear Cove), Bella Bella (McLoughlin Bay) and Ocean Falls, with greater frequency in the summer.

The sailing schedule varies throughout the season.

== History ==
The Nuxalk people were present in the Bella Coola valley prior to any formal written history of the area. This is confirmed both by oral history that continues unbroken to present day, and by written history of some of the first European explorers of the area.

In 1793, Alexander MacKenzie arrived from the east, completing the first recorded crossing of the continent north of Mexico.

Immigration (non-Nuxalk) to the region was sporadic and often temporary for the next century. A Hudson's Bay fur trading post was set up at the mouth of the river (the land granted to the post forms the off-reserve portion of the present-day "townsite"), and a handful of farmers were granted land farther up the valley. The trading trails of the Nuxalk and neighbouring nations became a popular route from the Pacific Ocean to central British Columbia, particularly during the Cariboo Gold Rush of the 1860s. In the 1870s, the valley was surveyed as a potential Pacific terminus of the Canadian Pacific Railway; (Burrard Inlet was the eventual choice, its selection giving birth to the city of Vancouver).

In 1894, after their previously existing community in Minnesota suffered an internal conflict, a group of Norwegian Lutheran settlers were given land grants in the valley, conditional upon land clearing and the construction of residences. The land they were granted, as well as other land previously granted to individuals was, in many cases, land that had been occupied by Nuxalk communities only a few decades (or fewer) earlier. However, the 1862 Pacific Northwest smallpox epidemic had decimated the Nuxalk population, and the survivors had, for the most part, gathered on land close to the mouth of the river (and close to the Hudson's Bay post). The Norwegian settlement was named Hagensborg and remains one of the main communities of the Bella Coola Valley. Although much of the Norwegian colony's population did migrate away, others stayed to work in forestry and in the development of the fishing industry. The cannery at Tallheo, across the arm from Bella Coola, was founded by a Norwegian settler who had given up on farming in the area.

These two populations (Norwegian settlers and Nuxalk), in varying proportions, continued to make up the vast majority of the community's population for most of the next century. However, in recent years, the Norwegian population (or connection to a Norwegian identity) has declined. In 2001, 43% of the population reported "Aboriginal identity", of which the vast majority is Nuxalk, while only 10% reported Norwegian (or Norwegian-Canadian) to be their "Ethnic Origin".

When the community of Ocean Falls suffered a massive population decline in 1980/81, due to the closure of the town's primary industry (a paper mill), Bella Coola became the administrative centre for British Columbia's central coast. This led to the relocation of the Central Coast Regional District (which, up until that time had been called the "Ocean Falls Regional District") offices to Bella Coola, and a general centralization of government services such as provincial government regional centres (e.g. Ministry of Forests) in Bella Coola.

== Economy ==
Fishing, forestry, public service (government/education), retail and tourism all contribute significantly to the economy. There is some limited agriculture, including an active farmers' market, processing of locally-caught seafood, a number of craftmakers and artists (including several celebrated Nuxalk artisans) and a fish hatchery. The only financial institution in Bella Coola is a branch of the Williams Lake & District Credit Union, heir to a sixty-plus-year tradition of the Bella Coola Valley Credit Union.

== In popular culture ==
In the 2008 film The Incredible Hulk, the main character, Bruce Banner / Hulk concludes the plot by escaping to Bella Coola, where he attempts to control his transformations. Significant footage for the film was shot in and near Bella Coola, though only very limited amounts were retained in the finished product.

== Government ==
=== Local ===
The Bella Coola Valley is not incorporated as a municipality. Its local government representation is provided through the Central Coast Regional District (CCRD). CCRD Electoral Areas "C", "D" and "E" each include parts of the Bella Coola Valley. The eastern portion is part of Electoral Area "C", the center portion is part of Electoral Area "D", and the western portion being Electoral Area "E".

- Electoral Area C director: Rita Svisdahl
- Electoral Area D director: Garrett Newkirk
- Electoral Area E director: Kelly Nestegard

=== Provincial ===
The Bella Coola Valley is located within the North Coast-Haida Gwaii electoral district of the British Columbia Legislative Assembly. The riding is represented by New Democratic MLA Tamara Davidson since 2024.

=== Federal ===
The Bella Coola Valley lies within the Canadian Parliamentary riding of Skeena-Bulkley Valley, currently represented by Conservative MP Ellis Ross since 2025.

== Notable people ==
- Inez Cook, author
- Andrew Crosby, rower
- Banchi Hanuse, filmmaker
- Anna Höstman, composer
- Lynda Price, chief of the Ulkatcho First Nation

== See also ==
- Bella Coola Music Festival
