= Bella Coola River =

- Mouth of Bella Coola River

Location
- Country: Canada
- Province: British Columbia

Physical characteristics
- Source: Coast Mountains
- Mouth: North Bentinck Arm
  - location: Burke Channel
  - coordinates: 52°23′23″N 126°46′39″W
  - elevation: 13 m (43 ft)
- Basin size: 5,009 km^{2} (1,934 sq mi)

The Bella Coola River is a major river on the Pacific slope of the Coast Mountains in southern British Columbia. The town of Bella Coola is at its mouth on North Bentinck Arm. Bella Coola Indian Reserve No. 1 is the location of the main community today of the surviving population of the Nuxalk who gathered there after depredations by smallpox and colonialization.

Bella Coola is the only town on the mainland of the British Columbia Coast between Kitimat and Squamish to have road access to the inland side of the Coast Mountains; it is at the end of Highway 20 from Williams Lake via the Chilcotin Country. It has a vehicular ferry terminal for a special routing from Port Hardy, on northern Vancouver Island, which also now stops at smaller communities on the inlets and islands in between.

The Bella Coola River is actually only a short stretch of a much larger stream which changes names at various points during its length; it is primarily the Atnarko River, but a few miles upstream from the town of Bella Coola, at the confluence of Burnt Bridge Creek and the Talchako River with the Atnarko, the name officially changes to the Bella Coola River. This river is the northern boundary of the subgroup of the Coast Mountains known as the Pacific Ranges; the large volcanic-shield and plateau Rainbow Range is immediately north and east of the Atnarko, while beyond it and the Dean River are the Kitimat Ranges, which correspond to the Pacific Ranges in scope.

The drainage basin of the Bella Coola River and its tributaries is 5,009 square kilometres (1,934 sq mi) in size.

== See also ==
- List of rivers of British Columbia
- List of rivers of the Pacific Ranges
