= Bella Coola Valley =

Valley in British Columbia, Canada

The Bella Coola Valley is a relatively small but distinct region located in the Central Coast region of British Columbia, Canada, comprising the valley of the Bella Coola River and its tributaries. The region is served by BC Hwy 20, which runs from Williams Lake to the town of Bella Coola at the head of North Bentinck Arm, from where there is seasonal ferry service to Vancouver Island and Prince Rupert.

The entire valley, and the regions surrounding North and South Bentinck Arm and Dean and Burke Channels, are the historical territory of the Nuxalk Nation, who claim sovereignty over it as unsurrendered to the Crown.

The Bella Coola River, and so by default the Bella Coola Valley, forms the boundary between the Kitimat Ranges to the north and the Pacific Ranges to the south, which are two of the three major subdivisions of the Coast Mountains, the other being the Boundary Ranges along the border with Alaska.

== Communities ==
- Bella Coola proper
- Bella Coola Indian Reserve No. 1
- Nusatsum, at the confluence of the Nusatsum River with the Bella Coola River
- Saloompt, at the confluence of the Salloomt River with the Bella Coola River
- Hagensborg
- Firvale
- Stuie

== See also ==
- Tallheo, British Columbia
- Kimsquit
