= South Bentinck Arm =

Inlet in British Columbia

Coordinates: 52°08′59″N 126°49′41″W

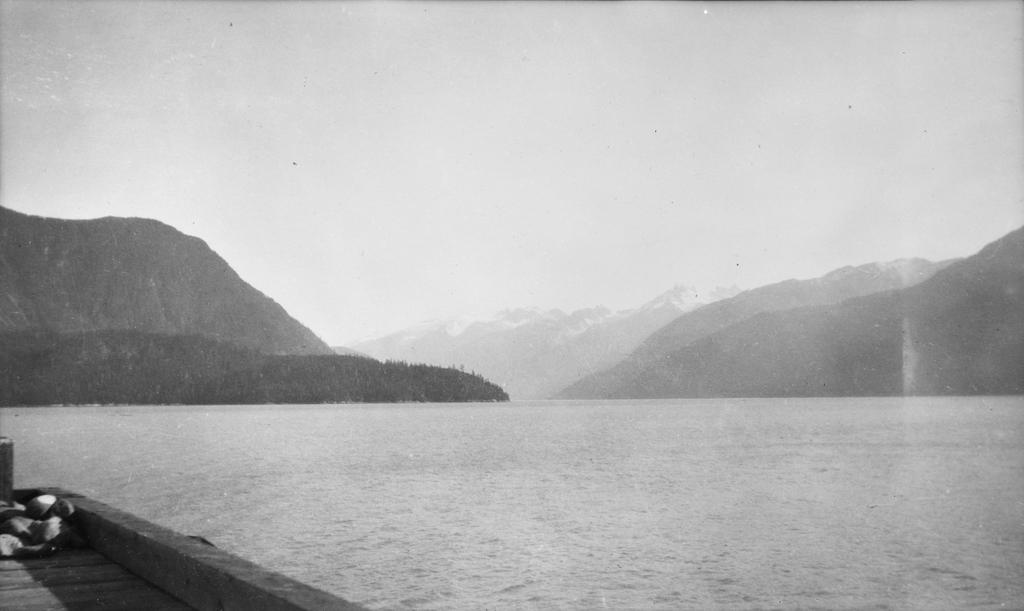
Southwest entrance to South Bentinck Arm

South Bentinck Arm is a 40 km (25 mi) long side-inlet of Dean Channel in the Central Coast region of British Columbia, Canada. At the north end of the arm it meets the North Bentinck Arm and then the Dean Channel before flowing into the Burke Channel.

== Rivers ==
The arm is fed by the Taleomey River, which flows from the Taleomey Glacier just north of the Monarch Icefield. The Taleomy Indian Reserve No. 3 lies on the west side of the rivers mouth next to the Taleomey Narrows.

Just to the north is the Noeick River and the locality of South Bentinck on the east shore of the inlet.

== Name origin ==
South and North Bentinck Arms were named by George Vancouver, as "Bentinck Arms", in 1793, after the House of Portland; the Duke of Portland at the time was William Henry Cavendish Bentinck.
