= Kimsquit Peak =

Mountain in British Columbia, Canada

- Location within British Columbia

Highest point
- Elevation: 2,268 m (7,441 ft)
- Prominence: 738 m (2,421 ft)
- Parent peak: Skuce Peak (2378 m)
- Listing: Mountains of British Columbia
- Coordinates: 52°51′49″N 126°56′13″W

Geography
- Country: Canada
- Province: British Columbia
- District: Range 3 Coast Land District
- Parent range: Kitimat Ranges
- Topo map: NTS 93D15 Kimsquit

Kimsquit Peak is a 2,268-metre (7,441 ft) mountain peak in the Kitimat Ranges of the Coast Mountains of British Columbia, Canada. The peak is located immediately north of the former Nuxalk village of Kimsquit, which is at the mouth of the Dean River. Immediately to its west across the head of Dean Channel is Comet Mountain.

== See also ==
- Kimsquit Ridge
