= Kimsquit Ridge =

Mountain ridge in British Columbia

Coordinates: 53°03′30″N 127°10′30″W

Kimsquit Ridge, 1827 m, is a mountain ridge on the west side of the Kimsquit River in the Kitimat Ranges of the Coast Mountains in British Columbia, Canada. It is north of the head of Dean Channel in between Foresight and Robson Creeks. There is a secondary peak, slightly lower than the northern peak, named Whitecone Peak, which is 1823 m elevation. The Bivouac Mountain Encyclopedia has dubbed the northern, slightly higher summit, Bluecone Peak.

== See also ==
- Kimsquit
- Kimsquit Peak
