= Anchor Cone =

Mountain in British Columbia, Canada

- Location within British Columbia
- Location in Lowe Inlet Marine Provincial Park

Highest point
- Elevation: 647 m (2,123 ft)
- Prominence: 177 m (581 ft)
- Listing: Mountains of British Columbia
- Coordinates: 53°32′30″N 129°34′00″W

Geography
- Location: British Columbia, Canada
- District: Range 4 Coast Land District
- Parent range: Countess of Dufferin Range
- Topo map: NTS 103H12 Lowe Inlet

Anchor Cone is a mountain in western British Columbia, Canada, located on the south side of Lowe Inlet, Grenville Channel, and southwest of Kitimat. It lies in the Countess of Dufferin Range, a subrange of the Kitimat Ranges which in turn form part of the Coast Mountains.
