= Kimsquit River =

- Mouth of Kimsquit River

Location
- Country: Canada
- Province: British Columbia
- District: Range 3 Coast Land District

Physical characteristics
- Source: Kitimat Ranges
  - location: Coast Mountains
- Mouth: Kimsquit
  - location: Dean Channel
  - coordinates: 52°52′52″N 127°4′43″W
  - elevation: 13 m (43 ft)

The Kimsquit River is a river in the Kitimat Ranges of the Coast Mountains in British Columbia, Canada, flowing into the head of Dean Channel, one of the major inlets of the Central Coast region.

== Name ==
The name Kimsquit is associated with a former Nuxalk village at the mouth of the Dean River, just to the southeast of the mouth of the Kimsquit River. It is also the namesake of Kimsquit Peak, which is east of the mouth of the Kimsquit River and immediately north of the mouth of the Dean, and of Kimsquit Ridge, which is alongside the Kimsquit River on its west side a few miles upstream from its mouth. Comet Mountain is immediately southwest of the mouth of the Kimsquit.

== See also ==
- List of rivers of British Columbia
