= Chatsquot Mountain =

Mountain in British Columbia, Canada

- Location within British Columbia
- Interactive map of Chatsquot Mountain

Highest point
- Elevation: 2,365 m (7,759 ft)
- Prominence: 1,981 m (6,499 ft)
- Parent peak: Howson Peak (2759 m)
- Listing: Canada most prominent peak 42nd Mountains of British Columbia
- Coordinates: 53°08′32″N 127°28′38″W

Geography
- Location: British Columbia, Canada
- District: Range 4 Coast Land District
- Parent range: Kitimat Ranges
- Topo map: NTC 93E3 Foresight Mountain

Climbing
- First ascent: 1960 Mikkel Schau, Stan Turner

Chatsquot Mountain, 2365 m (7759 feet), is a high-prominence summit in the Kitimat Ranges of the Coast Mountains in British Columbia, Canada, located northwest of Kimsquit Lake, east of the lower Kitlope River, and at the upper end of the basin of the Kimsquit River. It is part of the Kitimat Ranges which in turn form part of the Coast Mountains. With a topographic prominence of 1,981 m (6,499 ft), it is one of Canada's Ultra peaks and is the 98th most prominent summits of North America. It is also one of the most isolated mountain peaks of Canada.

== See also ==
- List of Ultras of North America
- Chatscah Indian Reserve No. 2
