= Comet Mountain (British Columbia) =

Mountain in the Kitimat Ranges of British Columbia, Canada

Coordinates: 52°51′06″N 127°10′09″W

Comet Mountain, 1742 m (5715 feet), is a mountain in the Kitimat Ranges of British Columbia, Canada, located immediately west of the head of Dean Channel in the Central Coast region of that province, to the northwest of the town of Bella Coola. The former Nuxalk village and still-Indian reserve Kimsquit is located immediately east across Dean Channel, Chatscah Indian Reserve No. 2 is immediately north at the mouth of the Kimsquit River.

== See also ==
- Comet (disambiguation)
