= Chatscah Indian Reserve No. 2 =

Indian reserve in British Columbia

Coordinates: 52°53′00″N 127°05′00″W

Chatscah Indian Reserve No. 2, officially Chatscah 2 is an Indian reserve of the Nuxalk Nation band government, located at the mouth of the Kimsquit River at the head of Dean Channel. Like nearby Kimsquit, at the mouth of the Dean River to the southeast, this Indian reserve was one of two reserves set aside of the once-populous Kimsquit subgroup of the Nuxalk, whose surviving post-smallpox population gathered at Bella Coola.

== See also ==
- List of Indian reserves in British Columbia
- Chatsquot Mountain
