= Sinclair Mountain =

Mountain in Alaska, United States

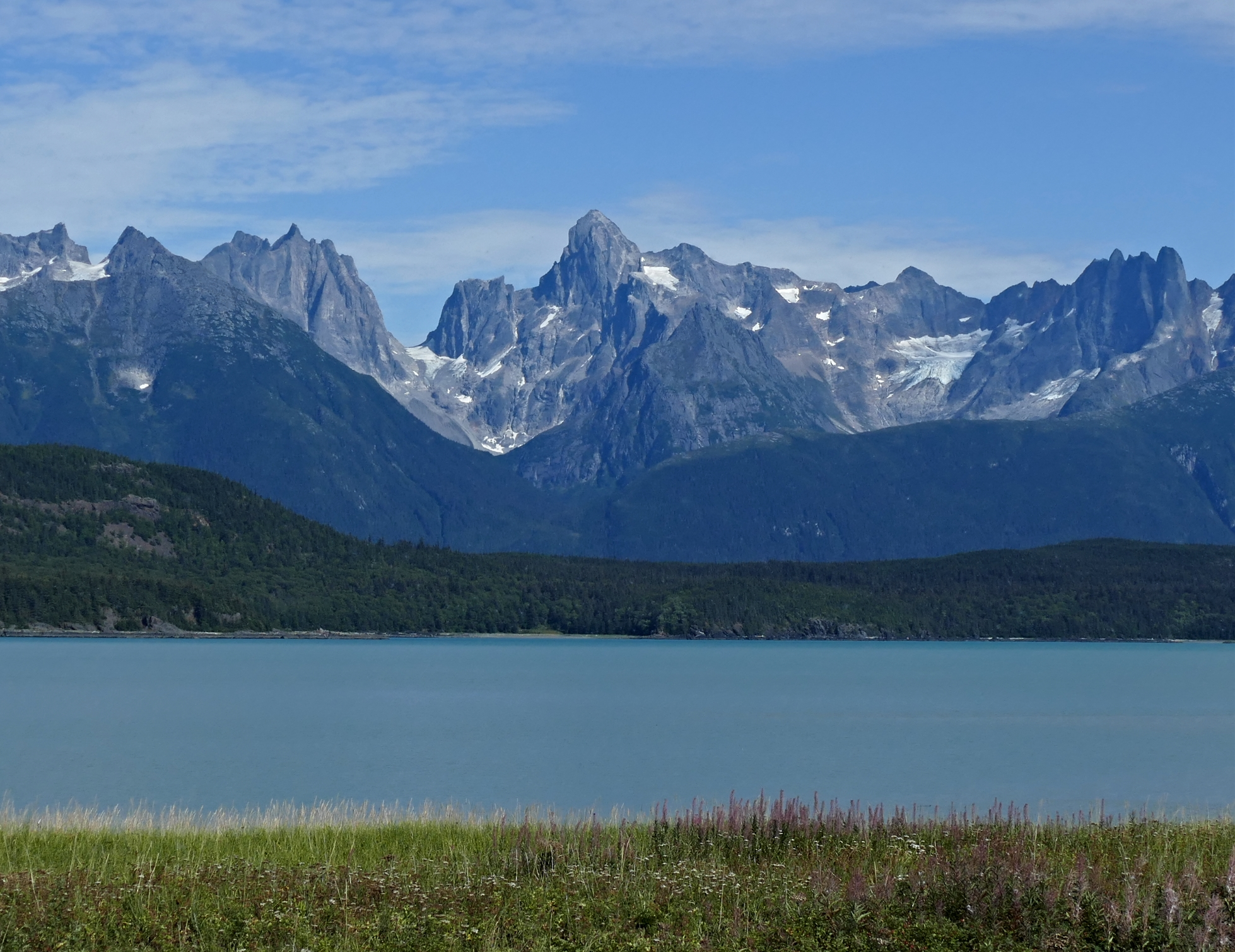
- Sinclair Mountain, west aspect

Highest point
- Elevation: 6,800+ ft (2,070+ m)
- Prominence: 3,600 ft (1,100 m)
- Isolation: 10.95 mi (17.62 km)
- Coordinates: 59°05′48″N 135°07′26″W

Geography
- Location within Alaska
- Interactive map of Sinclair Mountain
- Location: Tongass National Forest; Haines Borough; Alaska, United States
- Parent range: Coast Mountains; Boundary Ranges
- Topo map: USGS Skagway A-1

Geology
- Rock type: granite

Climbing
- First ascent: 1973
- Easiest route: class 5.4

Sinclair Mountain is a prominent 6,800+ ft (2,070+ m) mountain summit located in the Boundary Ranges of the Coast Mountains, in the U.S. state of Alaska. The peak is situated 26 mi (42 km) south of Skagway, and 15 mi (24 km) north of Lions Head Mountain, on land managed by Tongass National Forest. Although modest in elevation, relief is significant since Sinclair Mountain rises 6,800 feet above the entrance to Chilkoot Inlet in 3.5 mi (6 km). The peak's name was established in 1920 by the United States Coast and Geodetic Survey to remember Cephas Hempstone Sinclair (1847–1920), hydrographic and geodetic engineer who had 47 years of field service with that agency. The mountain's toponym was officially adopted in 1920 by the U.S. Board on Geographic Names. The first ascent of this seldom climbed peak was made in mid-June 1973 by Jerry Buckley, Joe Greenough, and Craig Lingle.

== Climate ==
Based on the Köppen climate classification, Sinclair Mountain has a subarctic climate with cold, snowy winters, and cool summers. Weather systems coming off the Gulf of Alaska are forced upwards by the Coast Mountains (orographic lift), causing heavy precipitation in the form of rainfall and snowfall. Temperatures can drop below −20 °C with wind chill factors below −30 °C. This climate supports glaciers on the north, south, and east sides of this mountain. The months May through July offer the most favorable weather for viewing or climbing Sinclair Mountain.

== Gallery ==
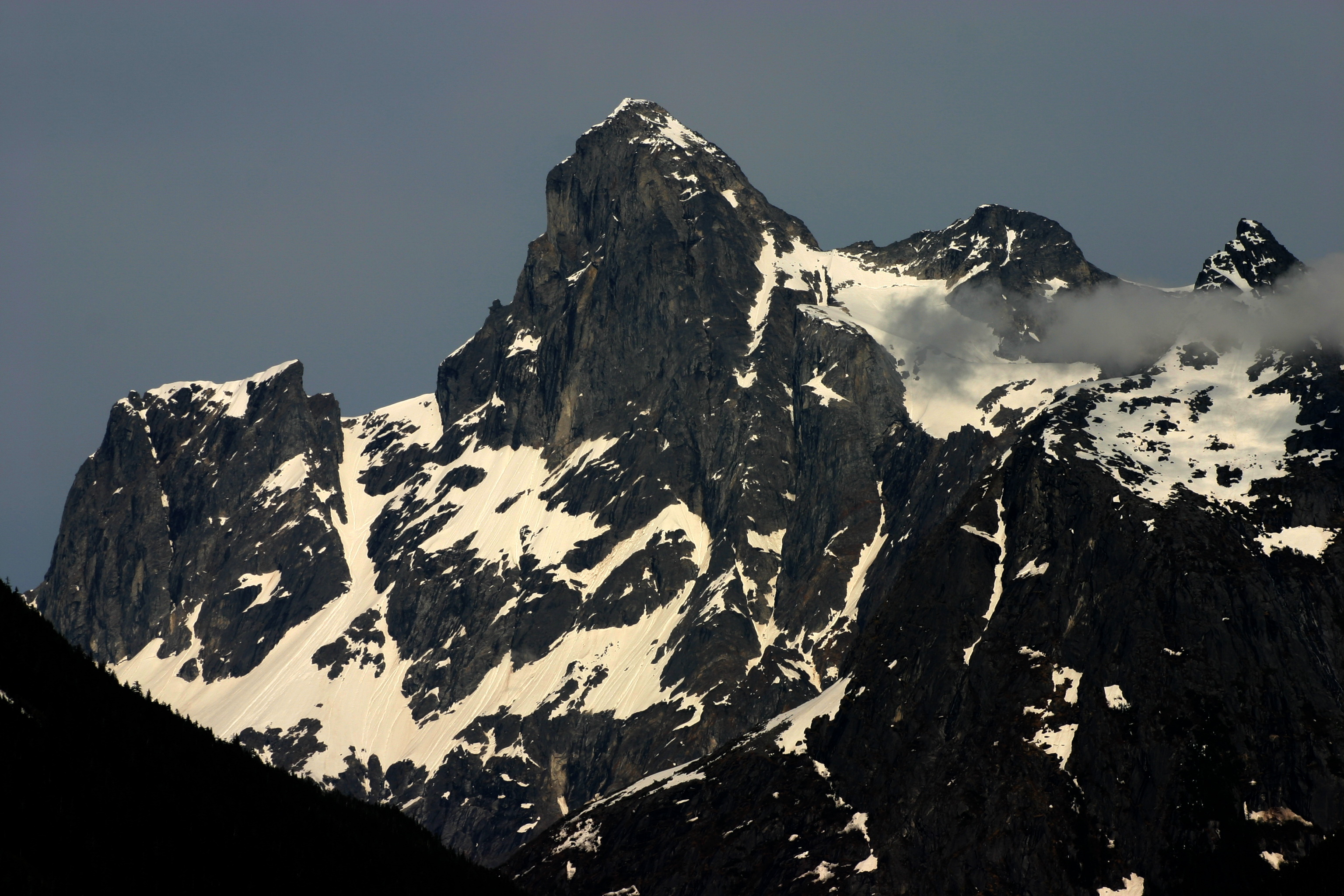
Sinclair Mountain summit detail

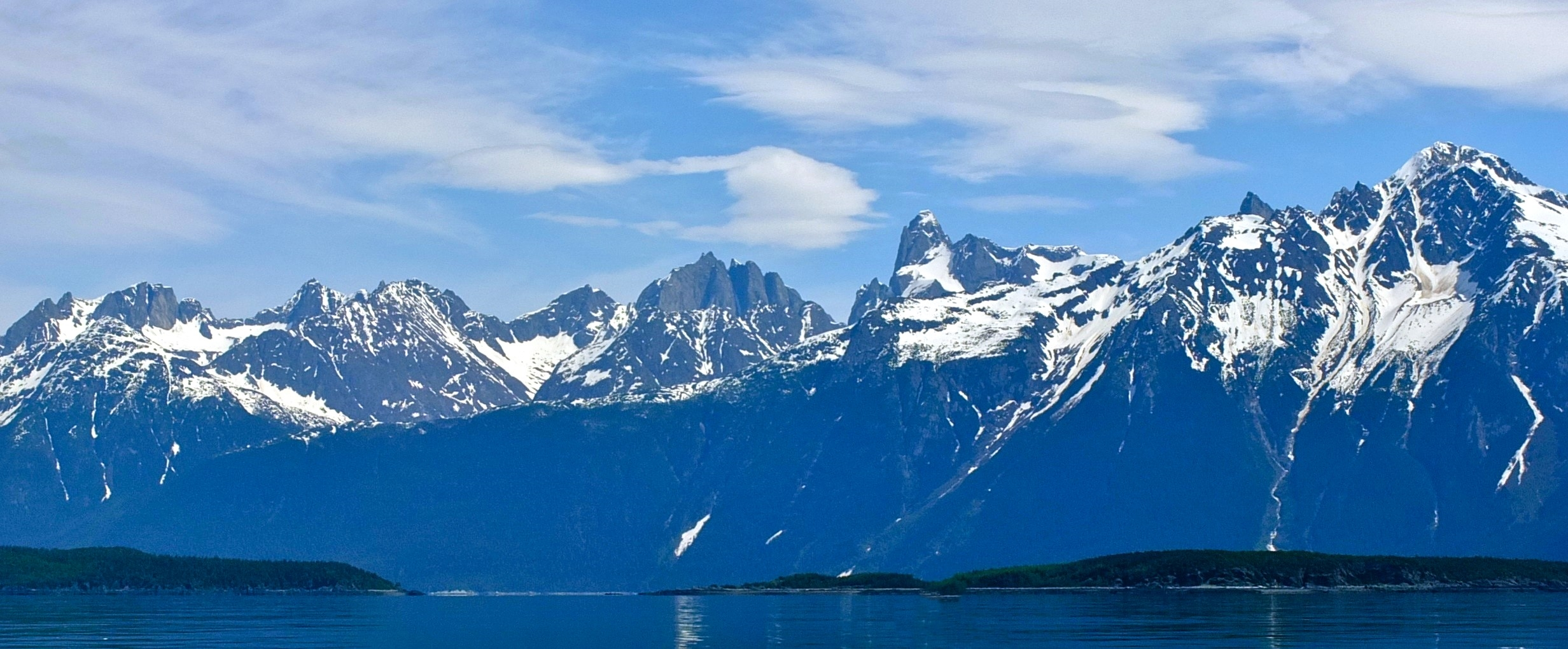
Sinclair Mountain centered

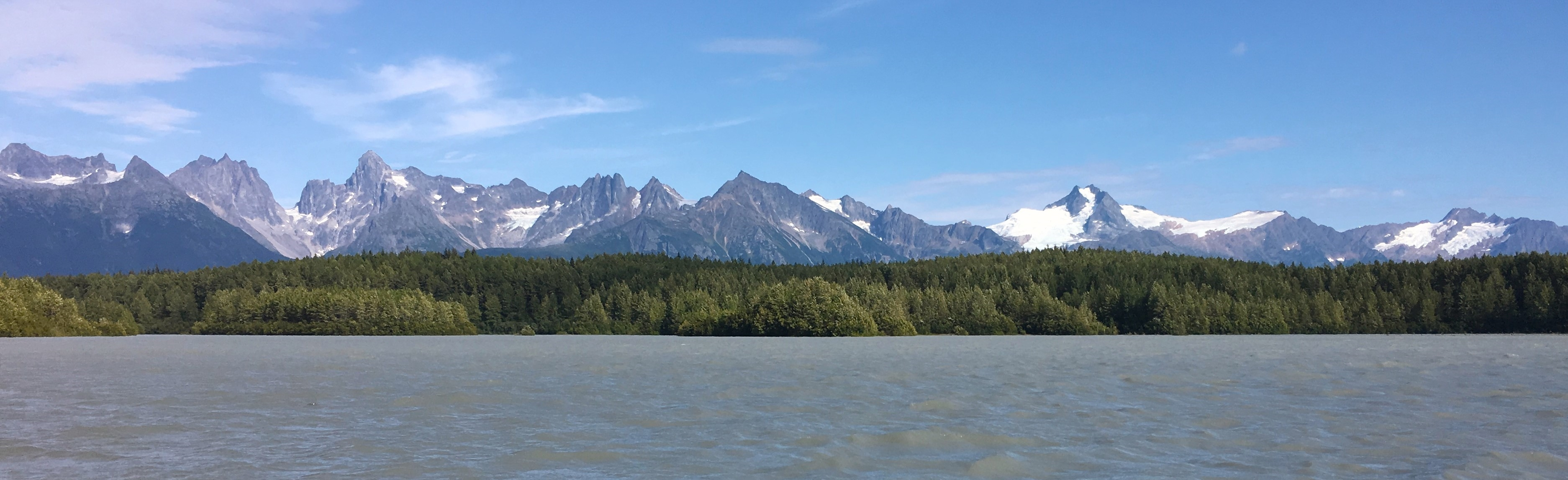
Sinclair Mountain to left, glaciated "Selby" (6,330 ft, 1,929 m) to right.

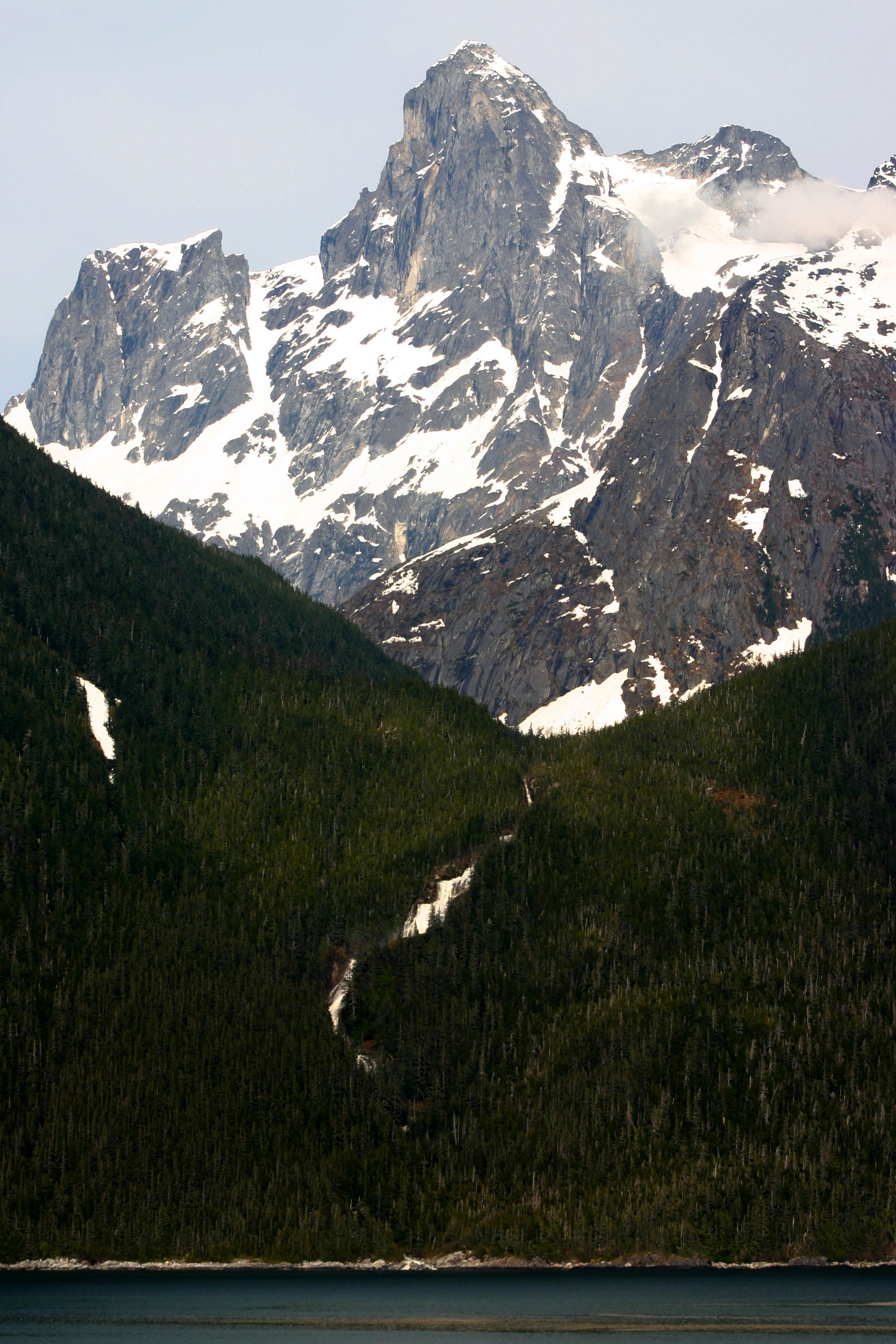

== See also ==
- List of mountain peaks of Alaska
- Geography of Alaska
