= Bunster =

Bunster is an Irish surname. People with this name include:

- Arthur Bunster (1827–1891), historical Member of Parliament from British Columbia, Canada
- Claudio Bunster (Teitelboim) Weitzman (born 1947), Chilean scientist
- Enrique Bunster (1912–1976), Chilean novelist and playwright
- Jorge Bunster (born 1953), Chilean businessman and politician
- Rolando Gonzalez-Bunster (born c. 1949), US-based Argentine businessman
- Marta Bunster, Chilean chemist

== See also ==
- Bunster Hill, in Dovedale, England
- Bunster Range, a small mountain range in southwestern British Columbia, Canada
