= Wharncliffe =

Wharncliffe may refer to:

== People ==
- Earl of Wharncliffe, various holders of a title of the English peerage created in 1876

== Places ==
Canada

- Wharncliffe and Kynoch, a local services board in Ontario province
- Wharncliffe Range, a small mountain range in British Columbia

United Kingdom

- Wharncliffe Crags, a gritstone escarpment near Sheffield in South Yorkshire, England
- Wharncliffe Side, a village in South Yorkshire

USA

- Wharncliffe, West Virginia, an unincorporated community in Mingo County

== Other ==
- Wharncliffe Charity Cup, a football competition named for the 1st Earl of Wharncliffe
- Wharncliffe Viaduct, a railway viaduct in Ealing, London, named for the 1st Earl of Wharncliffe
- Wharncliffe War Hospital was located during World War I at Middlewood Hospital, Sheffield
- Wharncliffe Woodmoor 1, 2 & 3 Colliery, a coal mine near Barnsley, South Yorkshire
- A shape of knife blade

== See also ==
- Warden Clip
