= Khtada River =

Watercourse in Canada

- Mouth of Khtada River

Location
- Country: Canada
- Province: British Columbia

Physical characteristics
- Source: Kitimat Ranges
  - location: Coast Mountains
  - coordinates: 54°3′11″N 129°21′43″W
  - elevation: 855 m (2,805 ft)
- Mouth: Skeena River
  - coordinates: 54°10′44″N 129°36′4″W
  - elevation: 31 m (102 ft)
- Length: 26 km (16 mi)
- Basin size: 157 km^{2} (61 sq mi),
- Discharge
  - average: 24.4 m^{3}/s (860 cu ft/s).

The Khtada River is a tributary of the Skeena River in the North Coast Regional District of the province of British Columbia, Canada. It originates in the Kitimat Ranges of the Coast Mountains, and flows south about 26 km (16 mi) to the lower tidal reach of the Skeena River, about 24 km (15 mi) upriver from Port Essington, 48 km (30 mi) southeast of Prince Rupert, and about 74 km (46 mi) southwest of Terrace.

Its watershed covers 157 km^{2} (61 sq mi), and its mean annual discharge is 24.4 m^{3}/s (860 cu ft/s). The Khtada River's watershed above Davis Lake is contained within the Khtada Lake Conservancy. Major mountain peaks in and around the Khtada's watershed include Cooper Peak, Sillimanite Needle, and Spinel Peak.

The Khtada River's watershed is within the traditional territory of the Tsimshian Lax-kw'alaams First Nation and the Metlakatla First Nation.

== Geography ==
The Khtada River originates in an unnamed lake from which it flows north and northwest, through Khtada Lake and Davis Lake, reaching the Skeena River just east of the mouth of the Scotia River.

The Khtada River's watershed's land cover is classified as 33.2% Coniferous, 28.6% Barren, 12.6% Herb, 9.3% Snow/Glacier, and 6.6% Shrub.

The Indian reserves Khtahda 10, of the Lax Kw'alaams and Metlakatla First Nations, is located at the mouth of the Khtada River.

== Natural history ==
The Khtada River supports runs of steelhead trout and eulachon.

== See also ==
- List of rivers of British Columbia
