= Acacia pedleyi =

Conservation status
- Endangered (NCA)

Scientific classification
- Kingdom: Plantae
- Clade: Tracheophytes
- Clade: Angiosperms
- Clade: Eudicots
- Clade: Rosids
- Order: Fabales
- Family: Fabaceae
- Subfamily: Caesalpinioideae
- Clade: Mimosoid clade
- Genus: Acacia
- Species: A. pedleyi

Binomial name
- Acacia pedleyi Tindale & Kodela
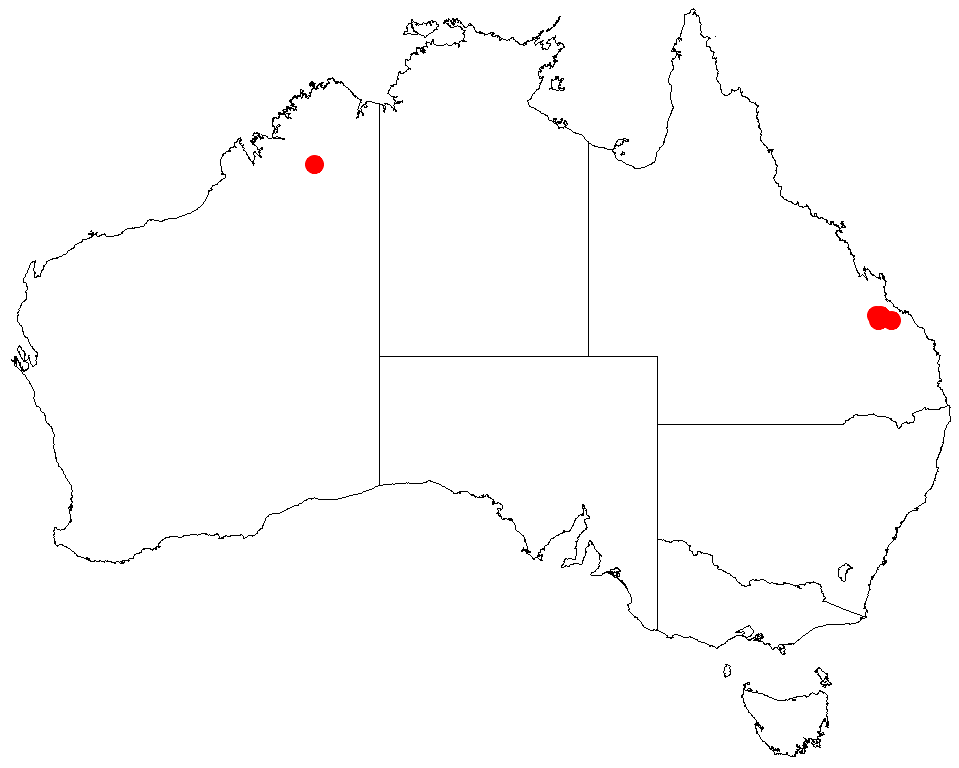
- Occurrence data from AVH

Species of legume

Acacia pedleyi, also known as Pedley's wattle, is a species of Acacia native to eastern Australia. It is considered to be an endangered species according to the Queensland Nature Conservation Act 1992.

== Description ==
The slender and erect tree typically grows to a height of 10 metres (33 ft) and has smooth grey to green bark that becomes rough close to the base. It has hairy, terete angled branchlets that are brown green to brown in colour and have 0.3 mm (0.012 in) high ridges. The leaves are dark green and feathery 1 to 2 centimetres (0.39 to 0.79 in) in length. They are herbaceous and bipinnate and have three to eight pairs of pinnae, that join an axis that is 2.1 to 7 cm (0.83 to 2.76 in) in length. Each pinnae is composed of 20 to 104 pairs of pinnules each of which have an oblong shape with a length of 0.8 to 3.6 mm (0.031 to 0.142 in) and a width of 0.3 to 0.7 mm (0.012 to 0.028 in)

== Distribution ==
A. pedleyi occurs in the understorey of open woodland and woodland communities along with Acacia crassa, Corymbia citriodora, Eucalyptus moluccana and Eucalyptus populnea. It is often situated on alluvial flats, hillslopes and ridges. The bulk of the population is located from around the Calliope Range to the Callide Range in the Port Curtis District in the Rockhampton Region of Central Queensland. Other much smaller populations are found near Biloela and around the Degalgil State Forest.

== See also ==
- List of Acacia species
