= Potato Range =

Potato Range may refer to:

- Alagalla Mountain Range, a mountain range in Sri Lanka
- Potato Range (British Columbia), a mountain range in Canada
