= Scotia River =

Khyex River
- Mouth of Scotia River

Location
- Country: Canada
- Province: British Columbia
- District: Range 5 Coast Land District

Physical characteristics
- Source: Kitimat Ranges
  - location: Coast Mountains
  - coordinates: 54°1′39″N 129°33′10″W
  - elevation: 330 m (1,080 ft)
- Mouth: Skeena River
  - coordinates: 54°10′14″N 129°38′10″W
  - elevation: 30 m (98 ft)
- Length: 22 km (14 mi)
- Basin size: 135 km^{2} (52 sq mi)
- Discharge
  - average: 19.5 m^{3}/s (690 cu ft/s)

The Scotia River is a tributary of the Skeena River in the North Coast Regional District of the province of British Columbia, Canada. It originates in the Kitimat Ranges of the Coast Mountains, and flows north about 22 km (14 mi) to the tidally-influenced lower Skeena River, about 20 km (12 mi) upriver from Port Essington, 47 km (29 mi) southeast of Prince Rupert, and about 75 km (47 mi) southwest of Terrace.

Its watershed covers 135 km^{2} (52 sq mi), and its mean annual discharge is 19.5 m^{3}/s (690 cu ft/s).

== Geography ==
The Scotia River originates in an unnamed lake fed by several small streams. The river flows north from the lake about 22 km (14 mi) to the Skeena River, just west of the Khtada River. Its main tributary of the West Fork Scotia River.

The Scotia River's watershed's land cover is classified as 62.5% Coniferous, 21.6% Herb, 19.3% Shrub, and 17.4% Barren.

== Natural history ==
The Scotia River mainstem and west fork support of runs of salmonids such as coho salmon, pink salmon, and steelhead trout. Between the river's source lake and the west fork confluence a waterfall limits anadromous fish passage.

Most of the Scotia River's watershed has been repeatedly logged since the 1980s. In recent decades logging has focused on upland areas, using both conventional and helicopter logging. Logging roads have been built throughout the Scotia watershed and from the West Fork Scotia over a low divide to Carthew Creek, a tributary of the Ecstall River.

== See also ==
- List of rivers of British Columbia
