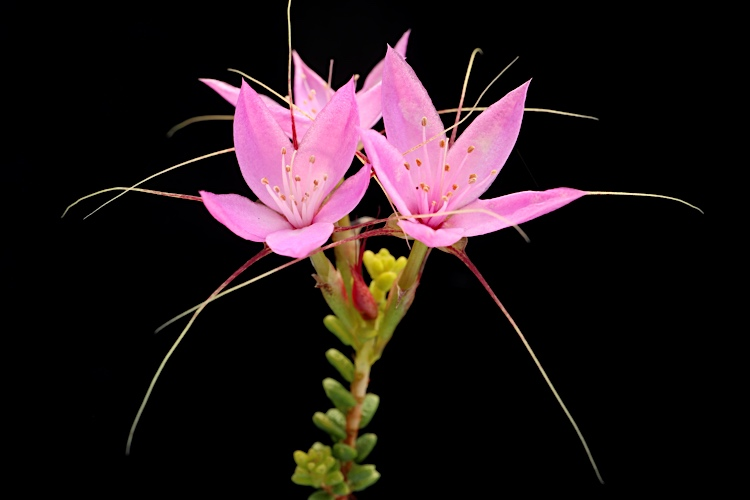
- In the Australian National Botanic Gardens

Scientific classification
- Kingdom: Plantae
- Clade: Tracheophytes
- Clade: Angiosperms
- Clade: Eudicots
- Clade: Rosids
- Order: Myrtales
- Family: Myrtaceae
- Genus: Calytrix
- Species: C. duplistipulata

Binomial name
- Calytrix duplistipulata Craven

= Calytrix duplistipulata =

Species of flowering plant

Calytrix duplistipulata is a species of flowering plant in the myrtle family Myrtaceae and is endemic to inland areas of Western Australia. It is a glabrous shrub with elliptic to egg-shaped or oblong leaves, and pink to purple flowers with about 9 to 16 stamens in a single row.

== Description ==
Calytrix duplistipulata is a glabrous shrub that typically grows to a height of 0.2–1 m (7.9 in – 3 ft 3.4 in). Its leaves are elliptic, broadly elliptic to egg-shaped or oblong, 1.25–3.25 mm (0.049–0.128 in) long and 0.8–1.8 mm (0.031–0.071 in) wide on a petiole 0.25–8 mm (0.0098–0.3150 in) long. There are stipules up to 1 mm (0.039 in) long at base of the leaves, often 2 stipules at the base of floral leaves, and sometimes at the base of the foliage leaves. The flowers are borne on a peduncle 1.75–2.5 mm (0.069–0.098 in) long. The floral tube is 8.5–14 mm (0.33–0.55 in) long, has 10 ribs. The sepals are joined for a short distance at the base, the lobes more or less round or elliptic, 1.5–2.5 mm (0.059–0.098 in) long and 1.8–2.5 mm (0.071–0.098 in) wide with an awn up to 15 mm (0.59 in) long. The petals are pink to purple, lance-shaped to elliptic, 8.5–11 mm (0.33–0.43 in) long and 2.5–4.0 mm (0.098–0.157 in) wide. There are about 9 to 16 white stamens 2.5–7.5 mm (0.098–0.295 in) long in a single row. Flowering occurs from March to November.

== Taxonomy ==
Calytrix duplistipulata was first formally described in 1987 by Lyndley Craven in the journal Brunonia from specimens collected near Lake Cronin in 1982. The specific epithet (duplistipulata) means 'having double stipules'.

== Distribution and habitat ==
This species of Calytrix grows in mallee heath in sandy soils on undulating plains from the Hyden district to the Fraser Range district in the Coolgardie, Mallee and Murchison bioregions of inland Western Australia.
