= Lewis Range (Coast Mountains) =

Mountain range in British Columbia, Canada

- Location within British Columbia

Highest point
- Elevation: 845 m (2,772 ft)

Geography
- Country: Canada
- Province: British Columbia
- Range coordinates: 51°12′59″N 127°20′05″W
- Parent range: Pacific Ranges
- Topo map: NTS 92M3 Belize Inlet

The Lewis Range is a small mountain range in southwestern British Columbia, Canada, located north of Mereworth Sound. It has an area of 52 km^{2} and is a subrange of the Pacific Ranges which in turn form part of the Coast Mountains.

== See also ==
- List of mountain ranges
