= Bell Range =

Mountain range in British Columbia, Canada

- Belle Range

Dimensions
- Area: 64 km^{2} (25 mi^{2})

Geography
- Country: Canada
- Province: British Columbia
- Range coordinates: 54°00′59″N 130°34′06″W
- Parent range: Kitimat Ranges

The Bell Range, formerly spelled Belle Range, is a small subrange of the Kitimat Ranges, located east of Welcome Harbour on Porcher Island, British Columbia, Canada.
