= Spiller Range =

Mountain range in British Columbia, Canada

Highest point
- Elevation: 665 m (2,182 ft)

Dimensions
- Area: 51 km^{2} (20 mi^{2})

Geography
- Country: Canada
- Province: British Columbia
- Range coordinates: 54°02′N 130°21′W
- Parent range: Kitimat Ranges

The Spiller Range is a small subrange of the Kitimat Ranges, located on the northeastern end of Porcher Island, British Columbia, Canada.
