= Ogden channel =

Ogden Channel
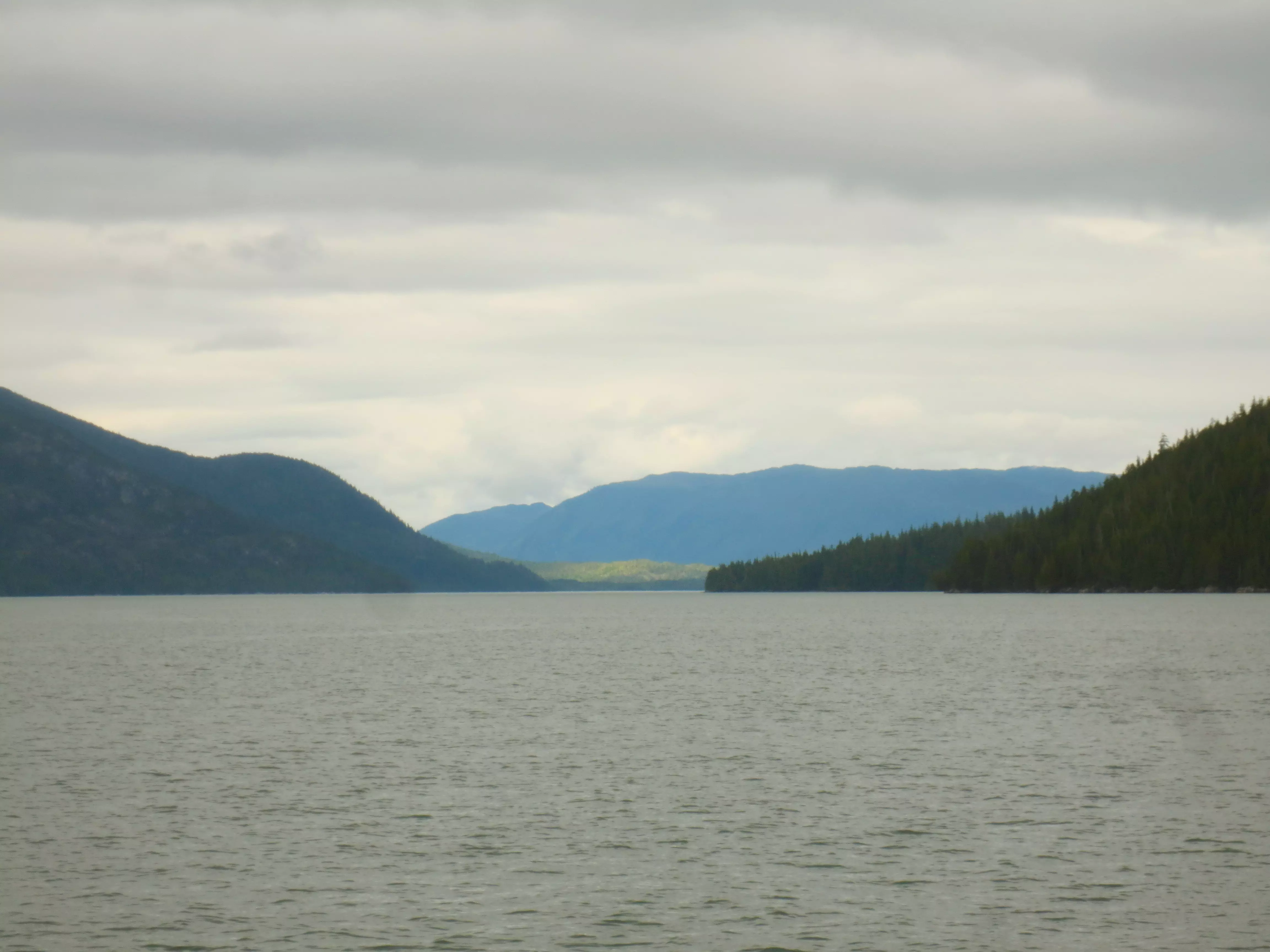

- Location in British Columbia
- Location: British Columbia, Canada
- Coordinates: 53°52′47″N 130°17′07″W

Ogden Channel is a strait on the North Coast of British Columbia, Canada, located between Porcher Island (NW) and Pitt Island (SE). The channel complex is part of the Alexander terrane, and dates between the late silurian and early devonian.

Channel waters contain a significant freshwater component, and the surface water layer of Ogden Channel does not reverse with incoming tides during snowmelt. The channel is an important migration corridor for juvenile sockeye salmon.

== Features ==
Features include:

- Alpha Point
- Comrie Head
- Oona River
- Peter Point
- Skene Cove
