= Georgina Range =

Mountain range in British Columbia, Canada

- Location within British Columbia

Geography
- Country: Canada
- Region: British Columbia
- Range coordinates: 50°39′47″N 126°19′37″W
- Parent range: Pacific Ranges

The Georgina Range is a small mountain range in southwestern British Columbia, Canada, located on the south side of Gilford Island overlooking entrance to Knight Inlet. It has an area of 53 km^{2} and is a subrange of the Pacific Ranges which in turn form part of the Coast Mountains.

== See also ==
- List of mountain ranges
