= Gastineau Range =

Mountain range in British Columbia, Canada

- Location within British Columbia

Geography
- Country: Canada
- Region: British Columbia
- Range coordinates: 50°23′N 124°48′W
- Parent range: Pacific Ranges

The Gastineau Range is a small mountain range in southwestern British Columbia, Canada, located west of the Brem River. It has an area of 107 km^{2} and is a subrange of the Pacific Ranges which in turn form part of the Coast Mountains.

== See also ==
- List of mountain ranges
