= Earle Range =

Mountain range in British Columbia, Canada

- Location within British Columbia

Geography
- Country: Canada
- Region: British Columbia
- Range coordinates: 49°49′07″N 123°46′46″W
- Parent range: Pacific Ranges

The Earle Range is a small mountain range in southwestern British Columbia, Canada, located on the east side of the south end of Prince of Wales Reach. It has an area of 158 km^{2} and is a subrange of the Pacific Ranges which in turn form part of the Coast Mountains.

== See also ==
- List of mountain ranges
