= Sir Alexander Mackenzie Provincial Park =

Provincial park in British Columbia, Canada

- IUCN category III (natural monument or feature)
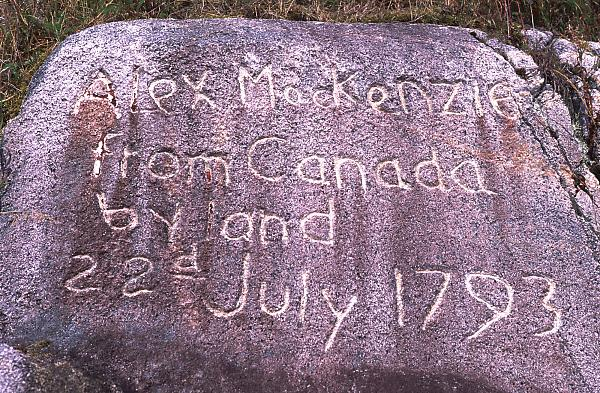
- “Alex MacKenzie from Canada by land 22d July 1793”

- Location within British Columbia
- Interactive map of Sir Alexander Mackenzie Provincial Park
- Location: Central Coast RD, British Columbia
- Nearest city: Bella Coola
- Coordinates: 52°22′48″N 127°28′16″W
- Area: 5.2 ha (13 acres)
- Created: 10 February 1926
- Governing body: BC Parks

Sir Alexander Mackenzie Provincial Park is a provincial park in British Columbia, Canada. Located at the mouth of Elcho Harbour on Dean Channel, it enshrines the farthest point west reached by Alexander Mackenzie in 1793 and the rock he marked to commemorate his journey. The park is also the location of a historical First Nations village, with petroglyphs that can be found along the beach.

The commemorative rock was originally painted on by Mackenzie using a mixture of bear grease and vermilion. The words were later inscribed permanently by surveyors.

"In 1923, a British Columbia land surveyor named (Captain) R.P. Bishop claimed to have found MacKenzie’s rock, although by then the paint had all disappeared. Bishop physically inscribed “Alex MacKenzie from Canada by land 22 July 1793” on the rock; note this is worded differently from the phrase reported by MacKenzie."

The Park and monument can only be reached by boat. If seas are very calm, a float plane landing may be possible. There are no facilities at this park. The nearest communities are Bella Coola to the southeast and Ocean Falls to the west.
