= Leckie Range (British Columbia) =

Mountain range in British Columbia, Canada

- Location within British Columbia

Highest point
- Coordinates: 50°57′10″N 123°05′45″W

Geography
- Country: Canada
- Region: British Columbia
- Parent range: Chilcotin Ranges

The Leckie Range is a small mountain range in southwestern British Columbia, Canada, located northwest of Gun Lake between Leckie Creek and Slim Creek. It has an area of 78 km^{2} and is a subrange of the Chilcotin Ranges which in turn form part of the Pacific Ranges of the Coast Mountains.

== See also ==
- List of mountain ranges
