= Pembroke Range =

Mountain range in British Columbia, Canada

Coordinates: 50°31′00″N 125°27′00″W

- Location within British Columbia

Geography
- Country: Canada
- Region: British Columbia
- Parent range: Pacific Ranges

The Pembroke Range is a small mountain range in southwestern British Columbia, Canada, between Loughborough Inlet and Phillips Arm. It has an area of 75 km^{2} and is a subrange of the Pacific Ranges which in turn form part of the Coast Mountains.

== See also ==
- List of mountain ranges
