= Sawtooth Range (Alaska) =

Mountain range in Alaska, United States

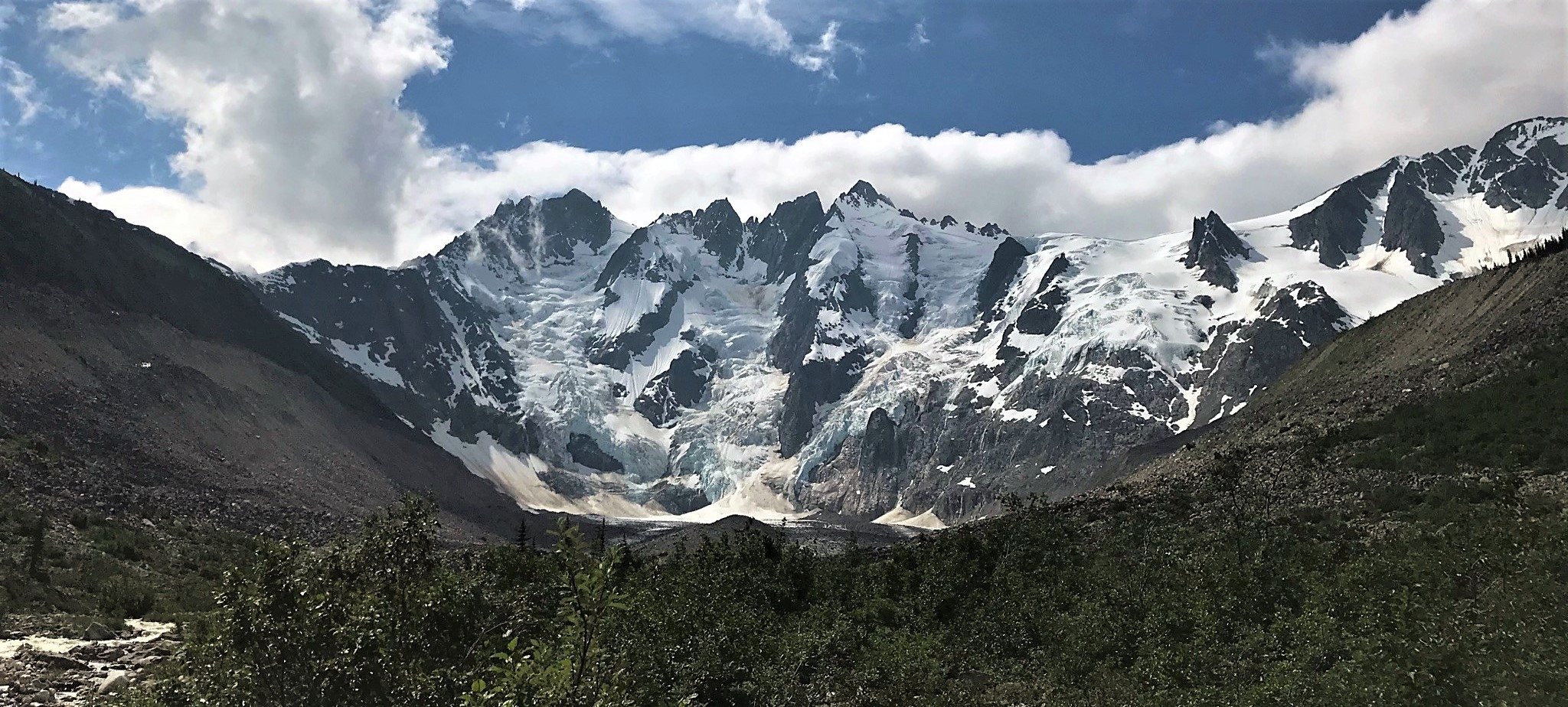
- North aspect featuring Laughton Glacier

Highest point
- Elevation: 7,477 ft (2,279 m)

Geography
- Location within Alaska
- Country: United States
- Region: Alaska
- Range coordinates: 59°30.2′N 135°6.3′W
- Parent range: Boundary Ranges
- Topo map: USGS Skagway C-1

The Sawtooth Range is a small mountain range in southeastern Alaska, United States, located just southwest of Warm Pass and on the north side of the East Fork of the Skagway River. It has an area of 97 km^{2} and is a subrange of the Boundary Ranges which in turn form part of the Coast Mountains.

== Climate ==
Based on the Köppen climate classification, the Sawtooth Range has a subarctic climate with cold, snowy winters, and cool summers. Weather systems coming off the Gulf of Alaska are forced upwards by the Coast Mountains (orographic lift), causing heavy precipitation in the form of rainfall and snowfall. Winter temperatures can drop below −10 °F with wind chill factors below −20 °F. This climate supports the Laughton Glacier on the north slope.

== See also ==
- List of mountain ranges
