= Nicholl Range =

Mountain range in British Columbia, Canada

- Location within British Columbia

Geography
- Country: Canada
- Region: British Columbia
- Range coordinates: 51°06′N 127°08′W
- Parent range: Pacific Ranges

The Nicholl Range is a small mountain range in southwestern British Columbia, Canada, located between Seymour Inlet and Belize Inlet. It has an area of 21 km^{2} and is a subrange of the Pacific Ranges which in turn form part of the Coast Mountains.

== See also ==
- List of mountain ranges
