= Pandemonium Creek slide =

The Pandemonium Creek slide occurred in 1959 in the Coast Mountains of British Columbia, Canada near the valley of the Atnarko River. It was a debris avalanche consisting of 5,000,000 m^{3} (180,000,000 cu ft) that travelled about 9 km (5.6 mi) and is thought to have reached speeds of up to 100 metres per second (330 ft/s).
