= Bare Top Range =

Mountain range in British Columbia, Canada

- Location within British Columbia

Dimensions
- Area: 37 km^{2} (14 mi^{2})

Geography
- Country: Canada
- Province: British Columbia
- Range coordinates: 53°33′59″N 129°36′05″W
- Parent range: Kitimat Ranges

The Bare Top Range is a small subrange of the Kitimat Ranges, running along the east side of Grenville Channel on the north side of Lowe Inlet in British Columbia, Canada.
