= Chismore Range =

Mountain range on Porcher Island, British Columbia, Canada

Highest point
- Elevation: 432 m (1,417 ft)

Dimensions
- Area: 22 km^{2} (8.5 mi^{2})

Geography
- Country: Canada
- Province: British Columbia
- Range coordinates: 53°59′N 130°16′W
- Parent range: Kitimat Ranges

The Chismore Range is a small subrange of the Kitimat Ranges, located on the western edge of Porcher Island, British Columbia, Canada.
