= Franklyn Range =

Mountain range in British Columbia, Canada

- Location within British Columbia

Geography
- Country: Canada
- Region: British Columbia
- Range coordinates: 50°28′04″N 125°38′47″W
- Parent range: Pacific Ranges

The Franklyn Range is a small mountain range in southwestern British Columbia, Canada, located on the west side of the entrance to Loughborough Inlet, north of Johnstone Strait northeast of Sayward. It has an area of 44 km^{2} and is a subrange of the Pacific Ranges which in turn form part of the Coast Mountains.

== See also ==
- List of mountain ranges
