= Kakuhan Range =

Mountain range in Alaska, United States

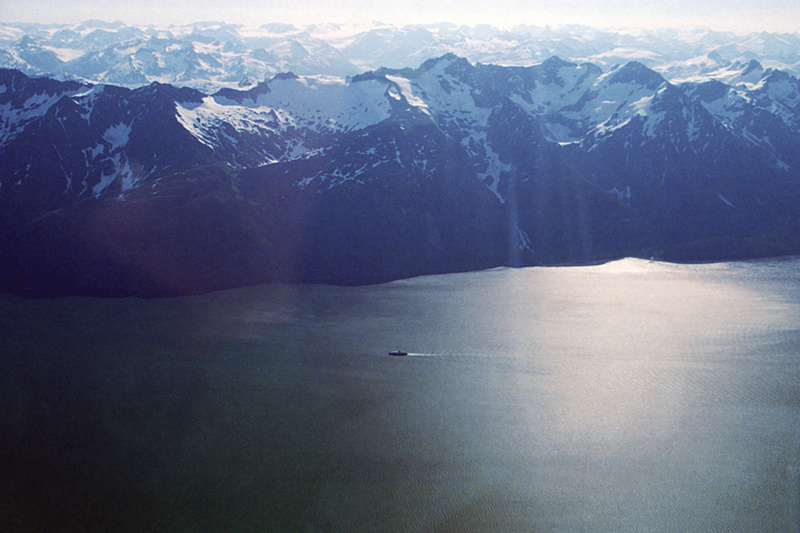
- Aerial view looking east

Dimensions
- Area: 323 km^{2} (125 mi^{2})

Geography
- Location within Alaska
- Country: United States
- Region: Alaska
- Range coordinates: 58°55.4′N 135°5.65′W
- Parent range: Boundary Ranges

The Kakuhan Range is a mountain range in southeastern Alaska, United States, located on the east side of the Lynn Canal south of Haines and north of Berners Bay which in turn is approximately 64 km (40 mi) north of Juneau. The range has an area of 323 km^{2} (125 sq mi) and is a subrange of the Boundary Ranges which form part of the Coast Mountains.

== See also ==
- List of mountain ranges
- Lions Head Mountain
