= Colville Range =

Mountain range in British Columbia, Canada

- Location within British Columbia

Geography
- Country: Canada
- Region: British Columbia
- Range coordinates: 50°57′N 126°46′E
- Parent range: Pacific Ranges

The Colville Range is a small mountain range in southwestern British Columbia, Canada, located on the north side of Mackenzie Sound and north of Broughton Island. It has an area of 20 km^{2} and is a subrange of the Pacific Ranges which in turn form part of the Coast Mountains.

== See also ==
- List of mountain ranges
