= Lions Head Mountain =

Mountain in Alaska, United States

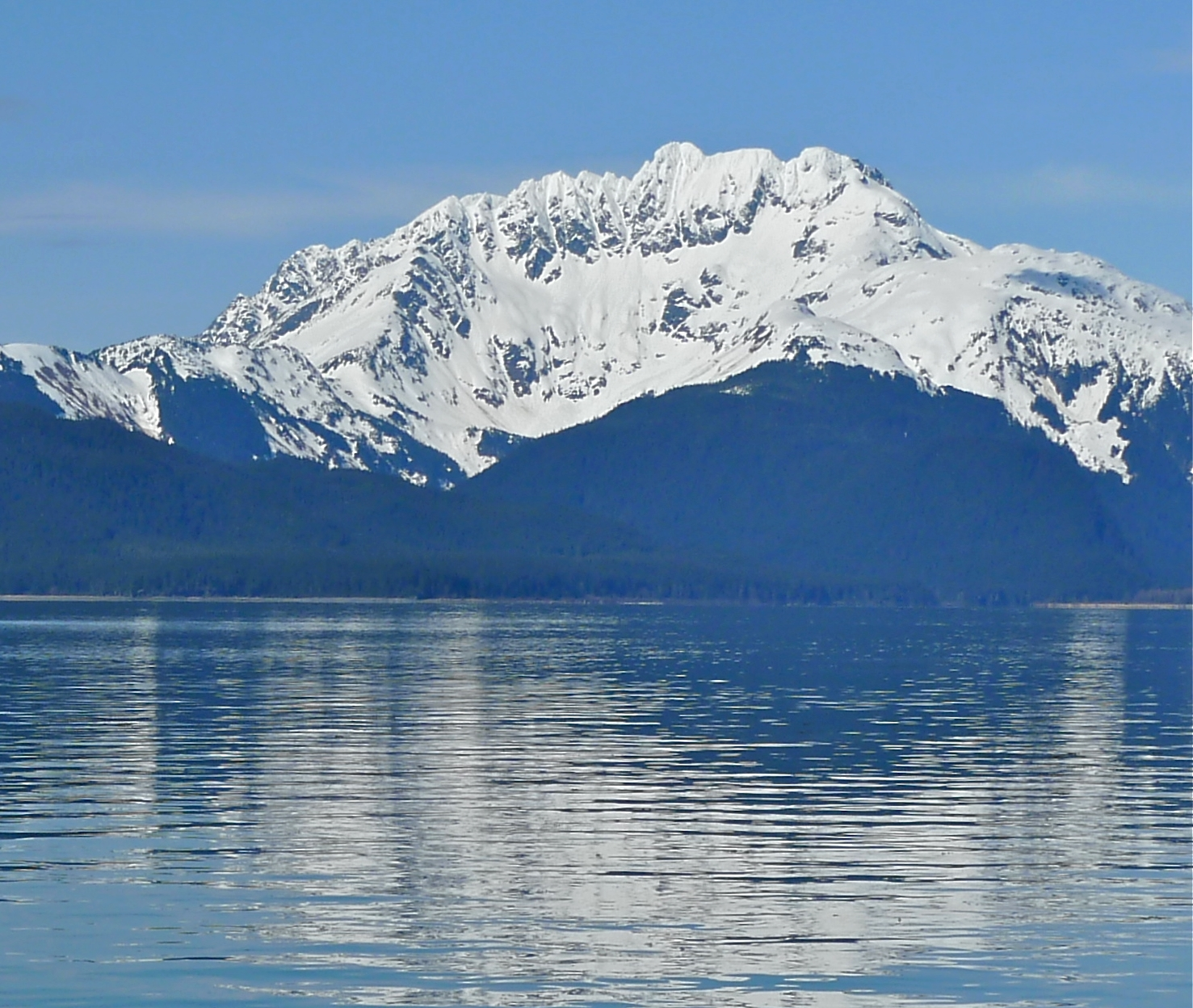
- Lions Head Mountain, south aspect

Highest point
- Elevation: 5,400+ ft (1,650+ m)
- Prominence: 1,200 ft (370 m)
- Parent peak: Phoebe (5,552 ft)
- Isolation: 1.6 mi (2.6 km)
- Coordinates: 58°52′40″N 135°03′50″W

Geography
- Location within Alaska
- Interactive map of Lions Head Mountain
- Country: United States
- State: Alaska
- Borough: Juneau
- Protected area: Tongass National Forest
- Parent range: Coast Mountains; Boundary Ranges; Kakuhan Range
- Topo map: USGS Juneau D-4

Geology
- Rock age: Triassic
- Rock type(s): metabasalt, greenstone

Climbing
- Easiest route: class 5.0

Lions Head Mountain is a 5,400+ ft (1,650+ m) mountain summit located in the Boundary Ranges of the Coast Mountains, in the U.S. state of Alaska. The peak is situated in the Kakuhan Range, 46 mi (74 km) northwest of Juneau, and 3 mi (5 km) east of Lynn Canal, on land managed by Tongass National Forest. Although modest in elevation, relief is significant since Lions Head Mountain rises 5,400 feet above the Berners River Valley in less than three miles. The peak's descriptive name was applied in 1867 by George Davidson, geographer with the United States Coast Survey, because its serrated profile resembles a lion couchant. This name was published in the 1869 Coast Pilot, and officially adopted in 1929 by the U.S. Board on Geographic Names.

== Climate ==
Based on the Köppen climate classification, Lions Head Mountain has a subarctic climate with cold, snowy winters, and cool summers. Weather systems coming off the Gulf of Alaska are forced upwards by the Coast Mountains (orographic lift), causing heavy precipitation in the form of rainfall and snowfall. Winter temperatures can drop below −20 °C with wind chill factors below −30 °C. This climate supports glaciers on the north side of this mountain. The months May through July offer the most favorable weather for viewing or climbing Lions Head Mountain.

== Gallery ==
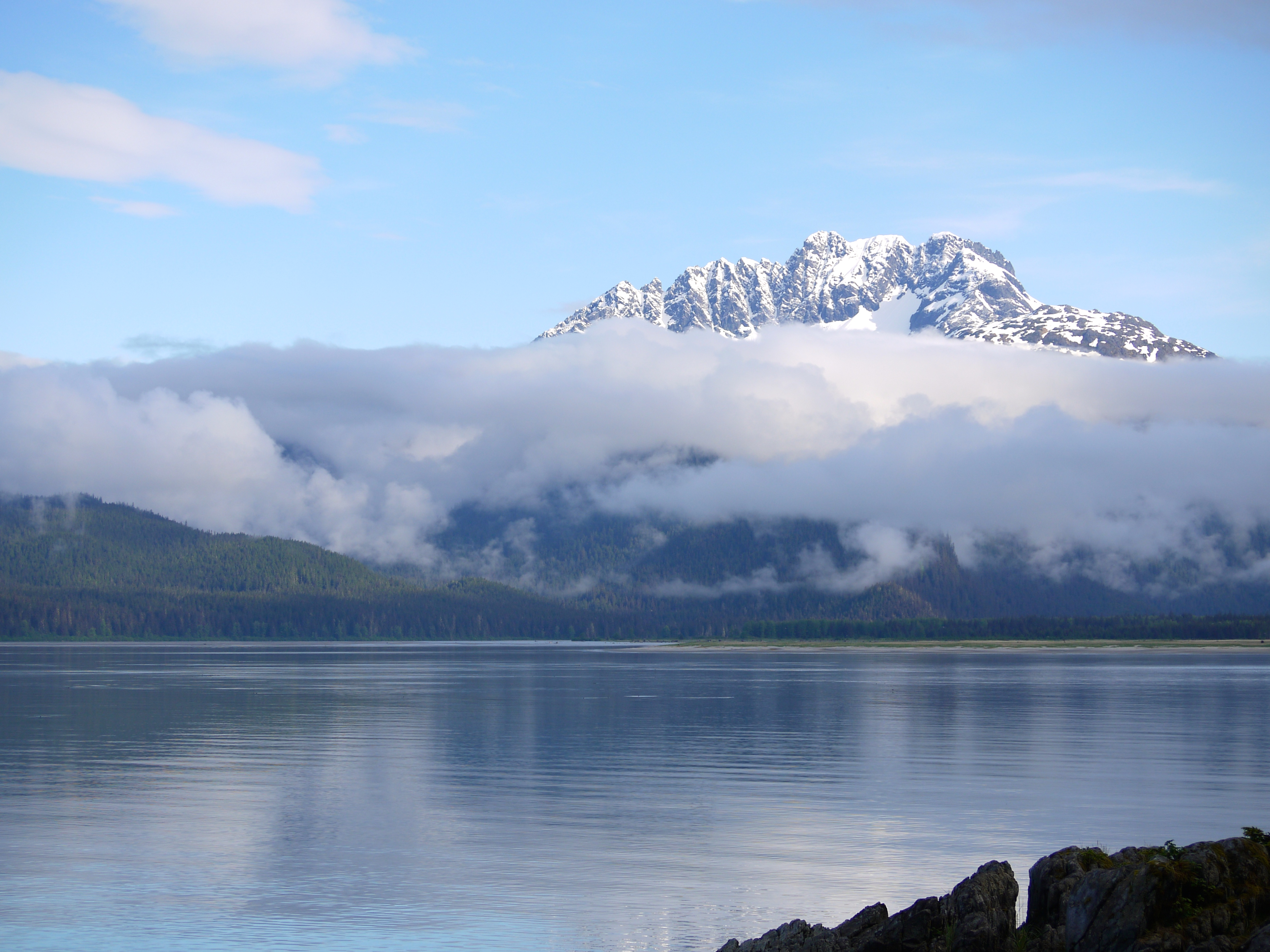

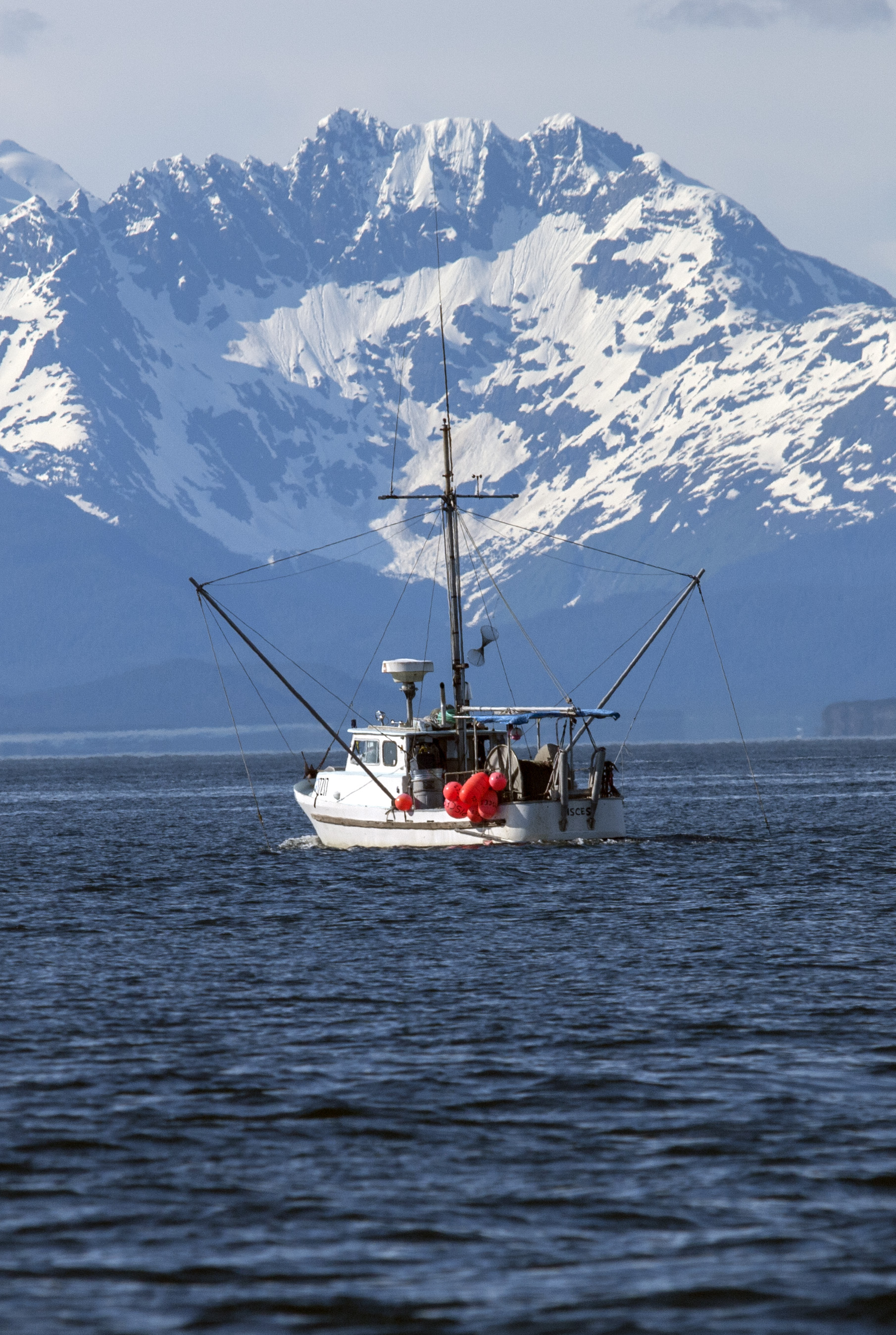

Lion Couchant

== See also ==
- List of mountain peaks of Alaska
- Geography of Alaska
