= Unwin Range =

Mountain range in British Columbia, Canada

- Location within British Columbia

Geography
- Country: Canada
- Region: British Columbia
- Range coordinates: 50°11′N 124°34′W
- Parent range: Pacific Ranges

The Unwin Range is a small mountain range in southwestern British Columbia, Canada, located on the eastern end of Homfray Channel. It has an area of 142 square kilometres (55 mi^{2}) and is a subrange of the Pacific Ranges which in turn form part of the Coast Mountains.

== See also ==
- List of mountain ranges
