= Coast Mountains =

Mountain range in Canada and the United States

- Coast Range
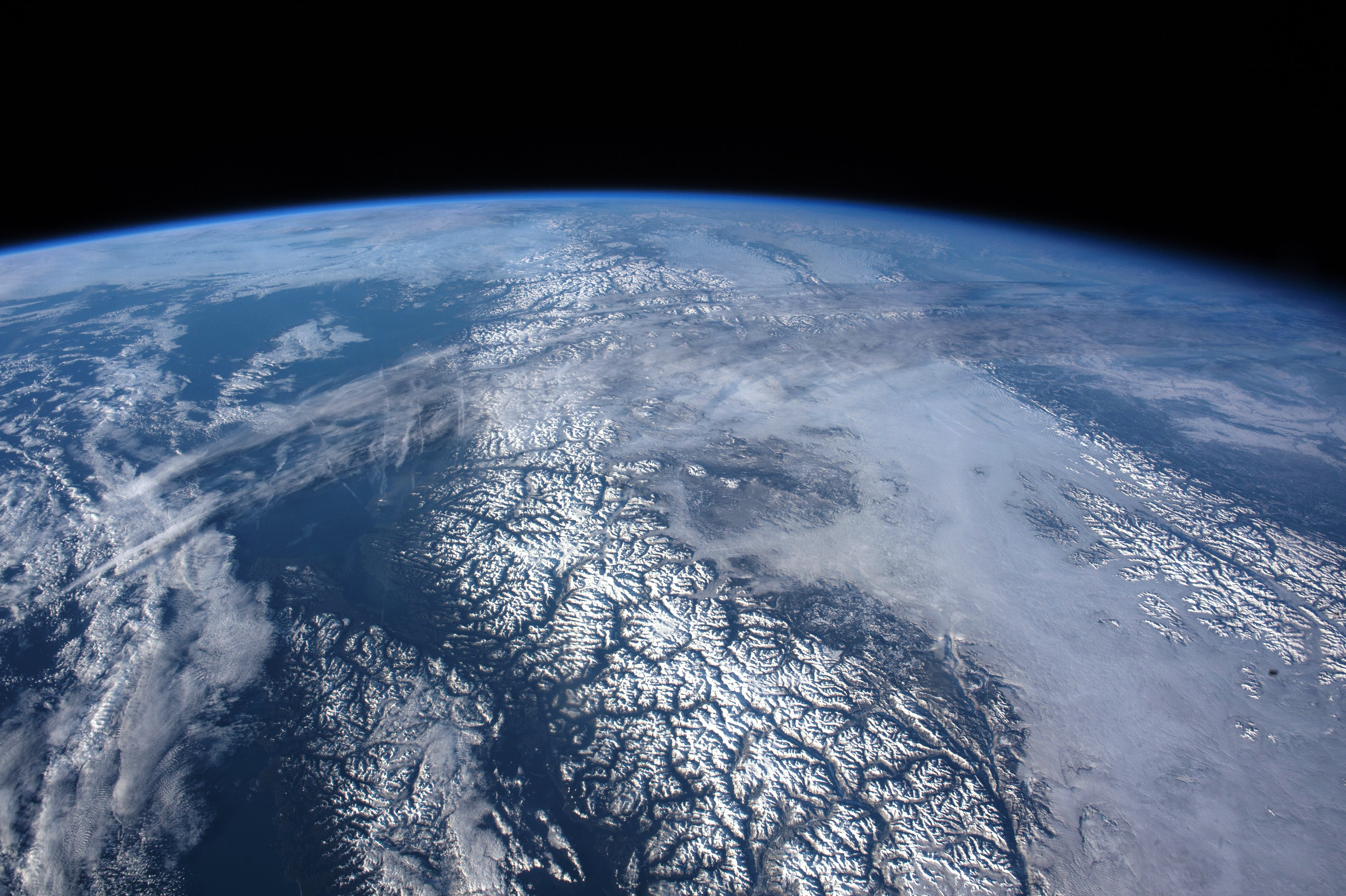
- Coast Mountains taken from the International Space Station from outer space. The Canadian Rockies can be seen on the right.

Highest point
- Peak: Mount Waddington, British Columbia
- Elevation: 4,019 m (13,186 ft)
- Coordinates: 51°22′30″N 125°15′30″W

Dimensions
- Length: 1,600 km (990 mi) north–south
- Width: 300 km (190 mi) east–west
- Area: 336,962 km^{2} (130,102 mi^{2})

Geography
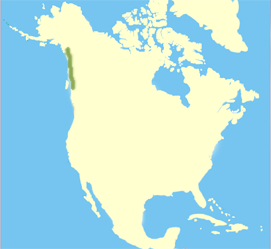
- Locator map of the Coast Mountains
- Countries: Canada and United States
- Region(s): Alaska, British Columbia and Yukon
- Range coordinates: 54°N 128°W
- Parent range: Pacific Coast Ranges

The Coast Mountain(s) (French: La chaîne Côtière) is a major mountain range in the Pacific Coast Ranges of western North America, extending from southwestern Yukon through the Alaska Panhandle and virtually all of the Coast of British Columbia south to the Fraser River. The mountain range's name derives from its proximity to the sea coast, and it is often referred to as the Coast Range. The range includes volcanic and non-volcanic mountains and the extensive ice fields of the Pacific and Boundary Ranges, and the northern end of the volcanic system known as the Cascade Volcanoes. The Coast Mountains are part of a larger mountain system called the Pacific Coast Ranges or the Pacific Mountain System, which includes the Cascade Range, the Insular Mountains, the Olympic Mountains, the Oregon Coast Range, the California Coast Ranges, the Saint Elias Mountains and the Chugach Mountains. The Coast Mountains are also part of the American Cordillera—a Spanish term for an extensive chain of mountain ranges—that consists of an almost continuous sequence of mountain ranges that form the western backbone of North America, Central America, South America and Antarctica.

The Coast Mountains are approximately 1,600 kilometres (1,000 mi) long and average 300 kilometres (190 mi) in width. The range's southern and southeastern boundaries are surrounded by the Fraser River and the Interior Plateau while its far northwestern edge is delimited by the Kelsall and Tatshenshini Rivers at the north end of the Alaska Panhandle, beyond which are the Saint Elias Mountains, and by Champagne Pass in the Yukon Territory. Covered in dense temperate rainforest on its western exposures, the range rises to heavily glaciated peaks, including the largest temperate-latitude ice fields in the world. On its eastern flanks, the range tapers to the dry Interior Plateau and the subarctic boreal forests of the Skeena Mountains and Stikine Plateau.

The Coast Mountains are part of the Pacific Ring of Fire—the ring of volcanoes and associated mountains around the Pacific Ocean—and contain some of British Columbia's highest mountains. Mount Waddington is the highest mountain of the Coast Mountains and the highest that lies entirely within British Columbia, located northeast of the head of Knight Inlet with an elevation of 4,019 metres (13,186 ft).

== Geography ==
The Coast Mountains consists of three subdivisions known as the Pacific Ranges, the Kitimat Ranges, and the Boundary Ranges. The Pacific Ranges are the southernmost subdivision of the Coast Mountains, extending from the lower stretches of the Fraser River to Bella Coola. Included in this subdivision are four of the five major coastal icecaps in the southern Coast Mountains. These are the largest temperate-latitude icecaps in the world and fuel a number of major rivers. Other than logging and a large ski resort at the resort town of Whistler, most of the land in the range is completely undeveloped. Mount Waddington, the highest mountain of the Coast Mountains, lies in the Waddington Range of the Pacific Ranges.

Just north of the Pacific Ranges lies the central subdivision known as the Kitimat Ranges. This subdivision extends from the Bella Coola River and Burke Channel in the south to the Nass River in the north.

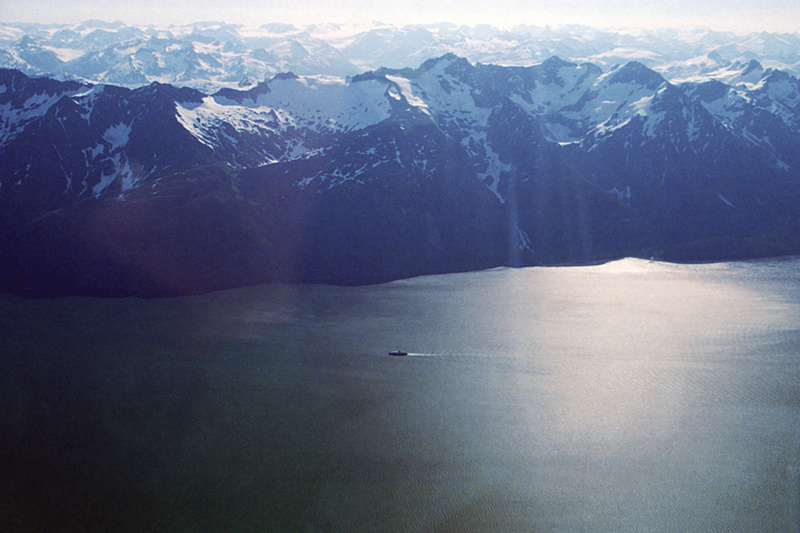
Kakuhan Range between Juneau and Haines, Alaska

The third and northernmost subdivision of the Coast Mountains is the Boundary Ranges, extending from the Nass River in the south to the Kelsall River in the north. It is also the largest subdivision of the Coast Mountains, spanning the British Columbia-Alaska border and northwards into Yukon flanking the west side of the Yukon River drainage as far as Champagne Pass, north of which being the Yukon Ranges. The Boundary Ranges include several large icefields, including the Juneau Icefield between Juneau, Alaska, and Atlin Lake in British Columbia, and the Stikine Icecap, which lies between the lower Stikine River and the Whiting River.

Because the Coast Mountains are just east of the Pacific Ocean, they have a profound effect on British Columbia's climate by forcing moisture-laden air off the Pacific Ocean to rise, dropping heavy rainfalls on the western slopes where lush forests exist. This precipitation is among the heaviest in North America. The eastern slopes are relatively dry and less steep and protect the British Columbia Interior from the Pacific weather systems, resulting in dry warm summers and dry cold winters.

Beyond the eastern slopes is a 154,635 km^{2} (59,705 mi^{2}) plateau occupying the southern and central portions of British Columbia called the Interior Plateau. Included within the Interior Plateau is a coalescing series of layered flood basalt lava flows. These sequences of fluid volcanic rock cover about 25,000 km^{2} (9,700 mi^{2}) of the Interior Plateau and have a volume of about 1,800 km^{3} (430 mi^{3}), forming a large volcanic plateau constructed atop of the Interior Plateau. North of the Interior Plateau on the range's northeastern slopes lies a huge mountainous area known by geographers as the Interior Mountains, which includes the neighbouring Skeena, Cassiar and Hazelton Mountains.

== Geology ==
=== Origins and growth ===
The Coast Mountains consist of deformed igneous and metamorphosed structurally complex pre-Tertiary rocks. These originated in diverse locations around the globe: the area is built of several different terranes of different ages with a broad range of tectonic origins. In addition, oceanic crust under the Pacific Ocean is being subducted at the southern portion of the range to form a north–south line of volcanoes called the Garibaldi Volcanic Belt, a northern extension of the Cascade Volcanoes in the northwestern United States, and contains the most explosive young volcanoes in Canada. Further north the northwesterly structural trend of the Coast Mountains lies partly in a large continental rift responsible for the creation of several volcanoes. These volcanoes form part of the Northern Cordilleran Volcanic Province, the most volcanically active area in Canada.

==== Insular and Omineca Arc eruptive periods ====
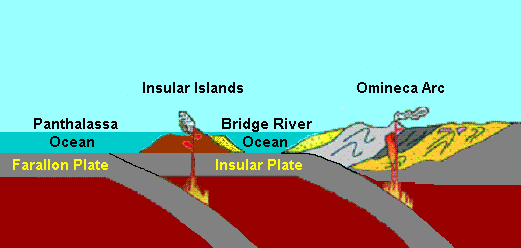
Bridge River Ocean between North America and the Insular Islands

The first event began 130 million years ago when a group of active volcanic islands approached a pre-existing continental margin and coastline of North America. These volcanic islands, known as the Insular Islands by geoscientists, were formed on a pre-existing tectonic plate called the Insular Plate by subduction of the former Farallon Plate to the west during the early Paleozoic era. This subduction zone records another subduction zone to the east under an ancient ocean basin between the Insular Islands and the former continental margin of North America called the Bridge River Ocean. This arrangement of two parallel subduction zones is unusual in that very few twin subduction zones exist on Earth; the Philippine Mobile Belt off the southeastern coast of Asia is an example of a modern twin subduction zone. As the Insular Plate drew closer to the pre-existing continental margin by ongoing subduction under the Bridge River Ocean, the Insular Islands drew closer to the former continental margin and coastline of western North America, supporting a pre-existing volcanic arc on the former continental margin of North America called the Omineca Arc. As the North American Plate drifted west and the Insular Plate drifted east to the old continental margin of western North America, the Bridge River Ocean eventually closed by ongoing subduction under the Bridge River Ocean. This subduction zone eventually jammed and shut down completely 115 million years ago, ending the Omineca Arc and the Insular Islands collided, forming the Insular Belt. Compression resulting from this collision crushed, fractured and folded rocks along the old continental margin. The Insular Belt then welded onto the pre-existing continental margin by magma that eventually cooled to create a large mass of igneous rock, creating a new continental margin. This large mass of igneous rock is the largest granite outcropping in North America.

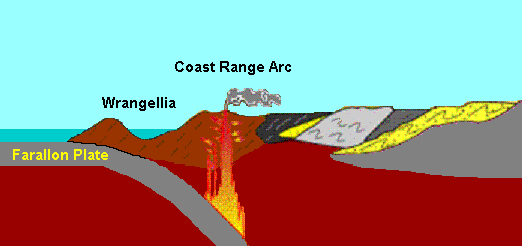
Plate tectonics of the Coast Range Arc about 100 million years ago

==== Coast Range Arc eruptive period ====
The final event began when the Farallon Plate continued to subduct under the new continental margin after the Insular Plate and Insular Islands collided with the old continental margin, supporting a new continental volcanic arc called the Coast Range Arc about 100 million years ago during the Late Cretaceous period. Magma rising from the Farallon Plate under the new continental margin ascended through the newly accreted Insular Belt, injecting huge quantities of granite into older igneous rocks of the Insular Belt. At the surface, new volcanoes were built along the continental margin. Named after the Coast Mountains, the basement of this arc was likely Early Cretaceous and Late Jurassic intrusions from the Insular Islands.

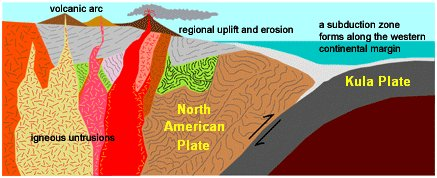
Plate tectonics of the Coast Range Arc about 75 million years ago

One of the major aspects that changed early during the Coast Range Arc was the status of the northern end of the Farallon Plate, a portion now known as the Kula Plate. About 85 million years ago, the Kula Plate broke off from the Farallon Plate to form a mid-ocean ridge known to geoscientists as the Kula-Farallon Ridge. This change apparently had some important ramifications for regional geologic evolution. When this change was completed, Coast Range Arc volcanism returned and sections of the arc were uplifted considerably in latest Cretaceous time. This started a period of mountain building that affected much of western North America called the Laramide orogeny. In particular a large area of dextral transpression and southwest-directed thrust faulting was active from 75 to 66 million years ago. Much of the record of this deformation has been overridden by Tertiary age structures and the zone of Cretaceous dextral thrust faulting appears to have been widespread. It was also during this period when massive amounts of molten granite intruded highly deformed ocean rocks and assorted fragments from pre-existing island arcs, largely remnants of the Bridge River Ocean. This molten granite burned the old oceanic sediments into a glittering medium-grade metamorphic rock called schist. The older intrusions of the Coast Range Arc were then deformed under the heat and pressure of later intrusions, turning them into layered metamorphic rock known as gneiss. In some places, mixtures of older intrusive rocks and the original oceanic rocks have been distorted and warped under intense heat, weight and stress to create unusual swirled patterns known as migmatite, appearing to have been nearly melted in the procedure.

Volcanism began to decline along the length of the arc about 60 million years ago during the Albian and Aptian faunal stages of the Cretaceous period. This resulted from the changing geometry of the Kula Plate, which progressively developed a more northerly movement along the Pacific Northwest. Instead of subducting beneath the Pacific Northwest, the Kula Plate began subducting underneath southwestern Yukon and Alaska and during the early Eocene period. Volcanism along the entire length of the Coast Range Arc shut down about 50 million years ago and many of the volcanoes have disappeared from erosion. What remains of the Coast Range Arc to this day are outcrops of granite when magma intruded and cooled at depth beneath the volcanoes, forming the present Coast Mountains. During construction of intrusions 70 and 57 million years ago, the northern motion of the Kula Plate might have been between 140 mm (6 in) and 110 mm (4 in) per year. However, other geologic studies determined the Kula Plate moved at a rate as fast as 200 mm (8 in) per year.

== High-prominence peaks ==
Mountain/Peak	Height (m/ft)		Prom. (m/ft)		Location
Mount Waddington	4,019	13,186	3,289	10,791	51°22.3′N 125°15.7′W
Monarch Mountain	3,555	11,663	2,930	9,610	51°54.0′N 125°52.6′W
Skihist Mountain	2,968	9,738	2,463	8,081	50°11.3′N 121°54.2′W
Mount Ratz	3,090	10,140	2,430	7,970	57°23.6′N 132°18.2′W
Mount Queen Bess	3,298	10,820	2,355	7,726	51°16.3′N 124°34.1′W
Razorback Mountain	3,183	10,443	2,253	7,392	51°35.4′N 124°41.5′W
Wedge Mountain	2,892	9,488	2,249	7,379	50°08.0′N 122°47.6′W
Otter Mountain	2,692	8,832	2,242	7,356	56°00.4′N 129°41.6′W
Kwatna Peak	2,290	7,510	2,225	7,300	52°04.2′N 126°57.6′W
Scud Peak	2,987	9,800	2,172	7,126	57°14.5′N 131°10.1′W

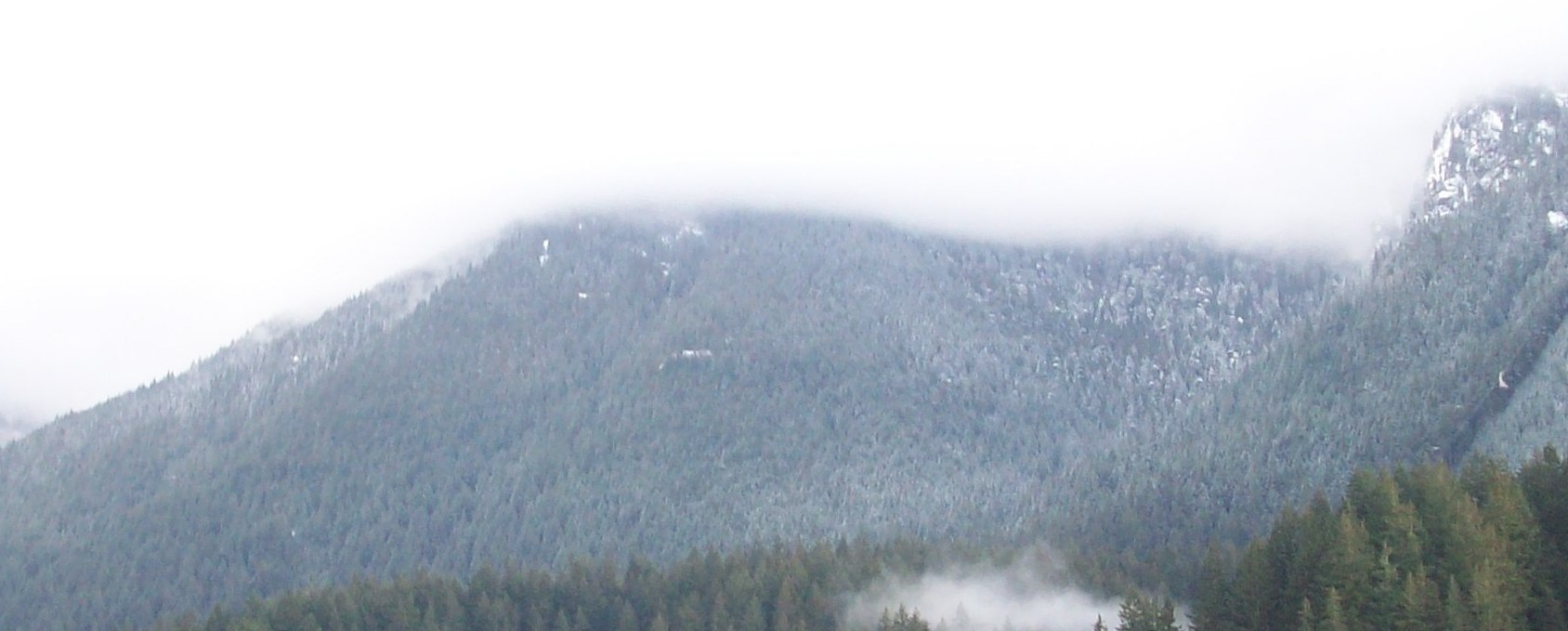
North Shore Mountains near Vancouver

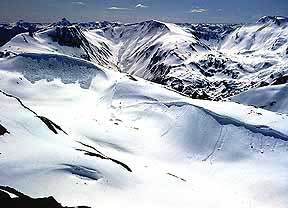
Juneau Icefield

== Mountain ranges ==
Range Name	Parent	Region(s)	Country
Boundary Ranges	Coast Mountains	British Columbia, Yukon, Alaska	Canada, United States
Boundary Range	Boundary Ranges	British Columbia, Alaska	Canada, United States
Adam Mountains	Boundary Ranges	Alaska	United States
Ashington Range	Boundary Ranges	British Columbia	Canada
Burniston Range	Boundary Ranges	British Columbia	Canada
Dezadeash Range	Boundary Ranges	Yukon	Canada
Florence Range	Boundary Ranges	British Columbia	Canada
Halleck Range	Boundary Ranges	Alaska	United States
Juneau Icefield	Boundary Ranges	British Columbia, Alaska	Canada, United States
Sawtooth Range	Juneau Icefield	Alaska	United States
Kakuhan Range	Boundary Ranges	Alaska	United States
Lincoln Mountains	Boundary Ranges	Alaska	United States
Longview Range	Boundary Ranges	British Columbia	Canada
Peabody Mountains	Boundary Ranges	Alaska	United States
Rousseau Range	Boundary Ranges	Alaska	United States
Seward Mountains	Boundary Ranges	Alaska	United States
Snowslide Range	Boundary Ranges	British Columbia	Canada
Spectrum Range	Boundary Ranges	British Columbia	Canada
Stikine Icecap	Boundary Ranges	British Columbia, Alaska	Canada, United States
Chechidla Range	Stikine Icecap	British Columbia	Canada
Cheja Range	Stikine Icecap	British Columbia	Canada
Kitimat Ranges	Coast Mountains	British Columbia	Canada
Bare Top Range	Kitimat Ranges	British Columbia	Canada
Countess of Dufferin Range	Kitimat Ranges	British Columbia	Canada
Kitlope Range	Kitimat Ranges	British Columbia	Canada
North Coastal Archipelago	Kitimat Ranges	British Columbia	Canada
Bell Range	North Coastal Archipelago	British Columbia	Canada
Burnaby Range	North Coastal Archipelago	British Columbia	Canada
Cape Range	North Coastal Archipelago	British Columbia	Canada
Chismore Range	North Coastal Archipelago	British Columbia	Canada
Murphy Range	North Coastal Archipelago	British Columbia	Canada
Richardson Range	North Coastal Archipelago	British Columbia	Canada
Spiller Range	North Coastal Archipelago	British Columbia	Canada
Williams Range	North Coastal Archipelago	British Columbia	Canada
Wimbledon Range	North Coastal Archipelago	British Columbia	Canada
Tenaiko Range	Kitimat Ranges	British Columbia	Canada
Pacific Ranges	Coast Mountains	British Columbia	Canada
Ashlu-Elaho Divide	Pacific Ranges	British Columbia	Canada
Bazalgette Range	Pacific Ranges	British Columbia	Canada
Bendor Range	Pacific Ranges	British Columbia	Canada
Bridge-Lillooet Divide	Pacific Ranges	British Columbia	Canada
Broughton Archipelago	Pacific Ranges	British Columbia	Canada
Calliope Range	Broughton Archipelago	British Columbia	Canada
Georgina Range	Broughton Archipelago	British Columbia	Canada
Bunster Range	Pacific Ranges	British Columbia	Canada
Cadwallader Range	Pacific Ranges	British Columbia	Canada
Caren Range	Pacific Ranges	British Columbia	Canada
Charlotte Alplands	Pacific Ranges	British Columbia	Canada
Douglas Ranges	Pacific Ranges	British Columbia	Canada
Chilcotin Ranges	Pacific Ranges	British Columbia	Canada
Camelsfoot Range	Chilcotin Ranges	British Columbia	Canada
Dickson Range	Chilcotin Ranges	British Columbia	Canada
Leckie Range	Chilcotin Ranges	British Columbia	Canada
Pantheon Range	Chilcotin Ranges	British Columbia	Canada
Potato Range	Chilcotin Ranges	British Columbia	Canada
Shulaps Range	Chilcotin Ranges	British Columbia	Canada
Clendinning Range	Pacific Ranges	British Columbia	Canada
Colville Range	Pacific Ranges	British Columbia	Canada
Conical Range	Pacific Ranges	British Columbia	Canada
Earle Range	Pacific Ranges	British Columbia	Canada
Edwards Range	Pacific Ranges	British Columbia	Canada
Florence Range	Pacific Ranges	British Columbia	Canada
Franklyn Range	Pacific Ranges	British Columbia	Canada
Fraser Range	Pacific Ranges	British Columbia	Canada
Garibaldi Ranges	Pacific Ranges	British Columbia	Canada
Garibaldi Névé	Garibaldi Ranges	British Columbia	Canada
Fitzsimmons Range	Garibaldi Ranges	British Columbia	Canada
McBride Range	Garibaldi Ranges	British Columbia	Canada
Spearhead Range	Garibaldi Ranges	British Columbia	Canada
Golden Ears	Garibaldi Ranges	British Columbia	Canada
Misty Icefield	Garibaldi Ranges	British Columbia	Canada
Bastion Range	Garibaldi Ranges	British Columbia	Canada
Gastineau Range	Pacific Ranges	British Columbia	Canada
Ha-Iltzuk Icefield	Pacific Ranges	British Columbia	Canada
Homathko Icefield	Pacific Ranges	British Columbia	Canada
Koeye Range	Pacific Ranges	British Columbia	Canada
Lewis Range	Pacific Ranges	British Columbia	Canada
Lillooet Icecap	Pacific Ranges	British Columbia	Canada
Compton Névé	Lillooet Icefield	British Columbia	Canada
Lillooet Ranges	Pacific Ranges	British Columbia	Canada
Cantilever Range	Lillooet Ranges	British Columbia	Canada
Cayoosh Range	Lillooet Ranges	British Columbia	Canada
Mission Ridge	Pacific Ranges	British Columbia	Canada
Monarch Icefield	Pacific Ranges	British Columbia	Canada
North Shore Mountains	Pacific Ranges	British Columbia	Canada
Fannin Range	North Shore Mountains	British Columbia	Canada
Britannia Range	North Shore Mountains	British Columbia	Canada
Namu Range	Pacific Ranges	British Columbia	Canada
Nicholl Range	Pacific Ranges	British Columbia	Canada
Niut Range	Pacific Ranges	British Columbia	Canada
Pemberton Icefield	Pacific Ranges	British Columbia	Canada
Pembroke Range	Pacific Ranges	British Columbia	Canada
Powell Divide	Pacific Ranges	British Columbia	Canada
Sir Harry Range	Pacific Ranges	British Columbia	Canada
Squamish-Cheakamus Divide	Pacific Ranges	British Columbia	Canada
Tantalus Range	Pacific Ranges	British Columbia	Canada
The Tahumming	Pacific Ranges	British Columbia	Canada
Tottenham Range	Pacific Ranges	British Columbia	Canada
Unwin Range	Pacific Ranges	British Columbia	Canada
Waddington Range	Pacific Ranges	British Columbia	Canada
Wharncliffe Range	Pacific Ranges	British Columbia	Canada
Whitemantle Range	Pacific Ranges	British Columbia	Canada

== See also ==
- Coast Range Arc
- Pandemonium Creek slide (1959)
- Geography of British Columbia
- Geology of British Columbia
- Volcanism of Canada
- Volcanism of Western Canada
- List of mountain ranges
- Rocky Mountains
- Columbia Mountains
