= Namu Range =

Mountain range in British Columbia, Canada

Coordinates: 51°51′N 127°47′W

- Location within British Columbia

Geography
- Country: Canada
- Region: British Columbia
- Parent range: Pacific Ranges

The Namu Range is a small mountain range in southwestern British Columbia, Canada, located south of Namu Lake, east of Fitz Hugh Sound. It has an area of 197 km^{2} and is a subrange of the Pacific Ranges which in turn form part of the Coast Mountains.

== See also ==
- List of mountain ranges
