= Murphy Range =

Mountain range in British Columbia, Canada

Coordinates: 25°15′36″S 149°18′00″E

Dimensions
- Area: 19 km^{2} (7.3 mi^{2})

Geography
- Country: Canada
- Province: British Columbia
- Parent range: Kitimat Ranges

The Murphy Range is a small subrange of the Kitimat Ranges, located on the westernmost side of Princess Royal Island, British Columbia, Canada.
