= Burnaby Range =

Mountain range in British Columbia, Canada

Dimensions
- Area: 30 km^{2} (12 mi^{2})

Geography
- Country: Canada
- Province: British Columbia
- Range coordinates: 53°32′N 129°36′W
- Parent range: Kitimat Ranges

The Burnaby Range is a small subrange of the Kitimat Ranges, located on Pit Island, British Columbia, Canada. It contains only one named mountain called Sylvan Peak.
