= Fraser Range =

Mountain range in Canada

- Location within British Columbia

Geography
- Country: Canada
- Region: British Columbia
- Range coordinates: 51°06′N 127°25′W
- Parent range: Pacific Ranges

The Fraser Range is a small mountain range in southwestern British Columbia, Canada, located north of the western end of Nugent Sound. It has an area of 37 km^{2} and is a subrange of the Pacific Ranges which in turn form part of the Coast Mountains.

== See also ==
- List of mountain ranges
- Fraser Range Station in Western Australia
