= Wimbledon Range =

Mountain range in British Columbia, Canada

- Location within British Columbia

Dimensions
- Area: 60 km^{2} (23 mi^{2})

Geography
- Country: Canada
- Province: British Columbia
- Range coordinates: 53°20′59″N 129°02′05″W
- Parent range: Kitimat Ranges
- Topo map: NTS 103H6 Hartley Bay

The Wimbledon Range is a small subrange of the Kitimat Ranges, located on the southern end of Gribbell Island, British Columbia, Canada.
