= Marta Bunster =

Chilean biologist

- Education: University of Concepción, University of Chile, University of Florida
- Known for: Hydrophobicity profiles method
- Scientific career
- Fields: Biochemistry, biophysics, crystallography
- Workplaces: University of Concepción
- Thesis: (1981)

Marta Cecilia del Carmen Bunster Balocchi is a Chilean scientist, most noted for her work in the fields of biochemistry, biophysics and crystallography. She is also known as one of the main promoters of bioinformatics in her country.

== Biography ==
She began studying biochemistry in 1969 at the University of Concepción, where she spent most of her academic and professional career. She obtained a biochemistry diploma in 1974 for her work about X-ray diffraction on synthetic polypeptides. After obtaining her degree, she moved to Santiago, where she worked at the laboratory of Osvaldo Cori and Aida Traverso, from the Faculty of Chemical Sciences of the University of Chile. There, she collaborated in the investigation of the kinetic properties of a potato apyrase. After 4 months, she returned to Concepción and entered to the Doctor of Sciences Program, with a major in chemistry. In 1975, she was conferred an academic position as instructor of biophysics for biochemistry teachers at the Department of Physiology of the Institute of Medical Biological Sciences, precursor of the current Biological Sciences Faculty of the University of Concepción. Bunster obtained her doctoral degree in 1981 for her study on synthetic polymers of pharmacological application, at the University of Concepción and the laboratory of George B. Butler at the University of Florida. That year, she returned to Concepción once more and met doctor Hilda Cid, a renowned scientist in the fields of physics and crystallography, who had returned from Sweden after being politically persecuted. During those years, Cid specialized in crystallographic techniques at Uppsala University, which provided her the necessary equipment for her studies once she returned to Chile. Together, they established the Molecular Biophysics Laboratory of the Faculty of Biological Sciences and Natural Resources, now the Faculty of Biological Sciences, and started studying new methods for proteins structures and folding prediction. Among their first research was the development of the secondary structures prediction method by means of hydrophobicity profiles, which was greatly welcomed in the region due to its high reliability and low cost, being one of the bases of some of the modern techniques. In the mid 90's, and coinciding with Cid's retirement, Bunster investigated phycobilisomes, a fluorescent, macromolecular-light harvesting system present primarily in cyanobacteria and red algae. This research led to the development of spectroscopic techniques and its application. It allowed a greater understanding of conformational changes phenomena from a physical perspective.

== Legacy ==
In the 2000s, driven by the boom of bioinformatics, Bunster dedicated her efforts to consolidating international cooperation in this area, forming in 2002 the Iberoamerican Network for Bioinformatics, later renamed as Iberoamerican Society for Bioinformatics (SoIBio), institution in which she assumed a directive role as Secretary on its first executive board, and on which she remains active to this day.

She was part of the Biological Sciences Doctoral Program since its creation, as well as one of the founding members and Director of the Master in Biochemistry and Bioinformatics and the Director of the Biochemistry and Molecular Biology Department from 2014 until her retirement in 2020.

== Organizational activity ==
Bunster has been part of numerous scientific organizations during her career, both in Chile and abroad. Some of them include: Chilean Chemical Society, Chilean Biology Society, Society of Biochemistry and Molecular Biology of Chile, Biophysical Society, International Society for Computational Biology (ISCB), and the Latin American Crystallographic Association (LACA).

== Featured publications ==
- Cid, H., Bunster, M., Arriagada, E., & Campos, M. (1982). Prediction of secondary structure of proteins by means of hydrophobicity profiles. FEBS Letters, 150(1), 247–254. https://doi.org/10.1016/0014-5793(82)81344-6.
- Cid, H., Vargas, V., Bunster, M., & Bustos, S. (1986). Secondary structure prediction of human salivary proline-rich proteins. FEBS letters, 198(1), 140–144. https://doi.org/10.1016/0014-5793(86)81200-5.
- Cid, H., Bunster, M., Canales, M., & Gazitúa, F. (1992). Hydrophobicity and structural classes in proteins. Protein engineering, 5(5), 373–375. https://doi.org/10.1093/protein/5.5.373.
- Contreras-Martel, C., Martinez-Oyanedel, J., Bunster, M., Legrand, P., Piras, C., Vernede, X., & Fontecilla-Camps, J. C. (2001). Crystallization and 2.2 Å resolution structure of R-phycoerythrin from Gracilaria chilensis: a case of perfect hemihedral twinning. Acta crystallographica. Section D, Biological crystallography, 57(Pt 1), 52–60. https://doi.org/10.1107/s0907444900015274.
- Godoy, F. A., Bunster, M., Matus, V., Aranda, C., González, B., & Martínez, M. A. (2003). Poly-beta-hydroxyalkanoates consumption during degradation of 2,4,6-trichlorophenol by Sphingopyxis chilensis S37. Letters in applied microbiology, 36(5), 315–320. https://doi.org/10.1046/j.1472-765x.2003.01315.x.
- Martínez-Oyanedel, J., Contreras-Martel, C., Bruna, C., & Bunster, M. (2004). Structural-functional analysis of the oligomeric protein R-phycoerythrin. Biological Research, 37(4). https://doi.org/10.4067/s0716-97602004000500003.
- Tobella, L. M., Bunster, M., Pooley, A., Becerra, J., Godoy, F., & Martínez, M. A. (2005). Biosynthesis of poly-beta-hydroxyalkanoates by Sphingopyxis chilensis S37 and Wautersia sp. PZK cultured in cellulose pulp mill effluents containing 2,4,6-trichlorophenol. Journal of industrial microbiology & biotechnology, 32(9), 397–401. https://doi.org/10.1007/s10295-005-0011-1.
- Contreras-Martel, C., Matamala, A., Bruna, C., Poo-Caamaño, G., Almonacid, D., Figueroa, M., Martínez-Oyanedel, J., & Bunster, M. (2007). The structure at 2 Å resolution of Phycocyanin from Gracilaria chilensis and the energy transfer network in a PC-PC complex. Biophysical chemistry, 125(2-3), 388–396. https://doi.org/10.1016/j.bpc.2006.09.014.
- Figueroa, M., Hinrichs, M. V., Bunster, M., Babbitt, P., Martinez-Oyanedel, J., & Olate, J. (2009). Biophysical studies support a predicted superhelical structure with armadillo repeats for Ric-8. Protein science, 18(6), 1139–1145. https://doi.org/10.1002/pro.124.
- Burgos, C. F., Castro, P. A., Mariqueo, T., Bunster, M., Guzmán, L., & Aguayo, L. G. (2015). Evidence for α-helices in the large intracellular domain mediating modulation of the α1-glycine receptor by ethanol and Gβγ. The Journal of pharmacology and experimental therapeutics, 352(1), 148–155. https://doi.org/10.1124/jpet.114.217976.
- Sivakumar, R., Manivel, A., Meléndrez, M., Martínez-Oyanedel, J., Bunster, M., Vergara, C., & Manidurai, P. (2015). Novel heteroleptic ruthenium sensitizers containing carbazole linked 4,5-diazafluorene ligand for dye sensitized solar cells. Polyhedron, 87, 135–140. https://doi.org/10.1016/j.poly.2014.11.008.
- Vásquez-Suárez, A., Lobos-González, F., Cronshaw, A., Sepúlveda-Ugarte, J., Figueroa, M., Dagnino-Leone, J., Bunster, M., & Martínez-Oyanedel, J. (2018). The γ^{33} subunit of R-phycoerythrin from Gracilaria chilensis has a typical double linked phycourobilin similar to β subunit. PLOS ONE, 13(4), e0195656. https://doi.org/10.1371/journal.pone.0195656.
