= Calliope Range =

Mountain range in British Columbia, Canada

- Location within British Columbia

Geography
- Country: Canada
- Region: British Columbia
- Range coordinates: 50°49′N 126°53′W
- Parent range: Pacific Ranges

The Calliope Range are a small low mountain range in southwestern British Columbia, Canada, located on the western end of Broughton Island and northeast of Port McNeill. It has an area of 15 km^{2} and is a subrange of the Pacific Ranges which in turn form part of the Coast Mountains.

== See also ==
- List of mountain ranges
