= Cape Range =

Mountain subrange in British Columbia, Canada

Highest point
- Elevation: 510 m (1,670 ft)

Dimensions
- Area: 82 km^{2} (32 mi^{2})

Geography
- Country: Canada
- Province: British Columbia
- Range coordinates: 51°30′N 127°55′W
- Parent range: Kitimat Ranges

The Cape Range is a small subrange of the Kitimat Ranges, located on the southern end of Calvert Island, British Columbia, Canada.
