= Williams Range =

Coordinates: 52°06′00″N 128°04′00″W

Dimensions
- Area: 25 km^{2} (9.7 mi^{2})

Geography
- Country: Canada
- Province: British Columbia
- Parent range: Kitimat Ranges

The Williams Range is a small subrange of the Kitimat Ranges, located on the southwestern end of Denny Island, British Columbia, Canada.
