= Richardson Range =

Mountain range in British Columbia, Canada

Coordinates: 52°41′N 128°54′W

Highest point
- Elevation: 296 m (971 ft)

Dimensions
- Area: 85 km^{2} (33 mi^{2})

Geography
- Country: Canada
- Province: British Columbia
- Parent range: Kitimat Ranges

The Richardson Range is a small subrange of the Kitimat Ranges, located on the southwestern flank of Princess Royal Island east of Kent Inlet, British Columbia, Canada.
