= Kitimat River Provincial Park =

Provincial park in British Columbia, Canada

- IUCN category II (national park)
- Location within British Columbia
- Interactive map of Kitimat River Provincial Park
- Location: British Columbia, Canada
- Nearest city: Kitimat
- Coordinates: 54°06′40″N 128°36′31″W
- Area: 0.57 km^{2} (0.22 sq mi)
- Established: May 17, 2004
- Governing body: BC Parks

Kitimat River Provincial Park is a provincial park in British Columbia, Canada. It was established on May 17, 2004, and is 57 ha. in size.
