= Potato Range (British Columbia) =

Mountain range in British Columbia, Canada

- Potato Mountains
- Location within British Columbia

Geography
- Country: Canada
- Region: British Columbia
- Range coordinates: 51°35′N 124°20′W
- Parent range: Chilcotin Ranges

The Potato Range, formerly gazetted as the Potato Mountains, is a small mountain range in southwestern British Columbia, Canada, located between Chilko Lake and Tatlayoko Lake. It has an area of 320 km^{2} and is a subrange of the Chilcotin Ranges which in turn form part of the Pacific Ranges of the Coast Mountains.

== See also ==
- List of mountain ranges
