= Countess of Dufferin Range =

- Location within British Columbia

Dimensions
- Area: 54 km^{2} (21 mi^{2})

Geography
- Country: Canada
- Province: British Columbia
- Range coordinates: 53°31′59″N 129°32′05″W
- Parent range: Kitimat Ranges
- Topo map: NTS 103H12 Lowe Inlet

The Countess of Dufferin Range is a small subrange of the Kitimat Ranges, running along the east side of Grenville Channel on the south side of Lowe Inlet in British Columbia, Canada.

The range was named for Hariot Georgina, wife of the Earl of Dufferin who served as the third Governor General of Canada from 1872 to 1878.
