= Wharncliffe Range =

Mountain range in British Columbia, Canada

- Location within British Columbia

Highest point
- Coordinates: 50°29′N 125°44′W

Dimensions
- Area: 55 km^{2} (21 mi^{2})

Geography
- Country: Canada
- Region: British Columbia
- Parent range: Pacific Ranges

The Wharncliffe Range is a very small mountain range in the Pacific Ranges of the southern Coast Mountains in southwestern British Columbia, Canada, located on the north side of Forward Harbour.
