= Mereworth Sound =

Sound located in Central British Columbia

Coordinates: 51°12′00″N 127°20′00″W

Mereworth Sound is a sound on the Central Coast of British Columbia, Canada, located to the north of Belize Inlet.

== See also ==
- Mereworth
