= Dean River =

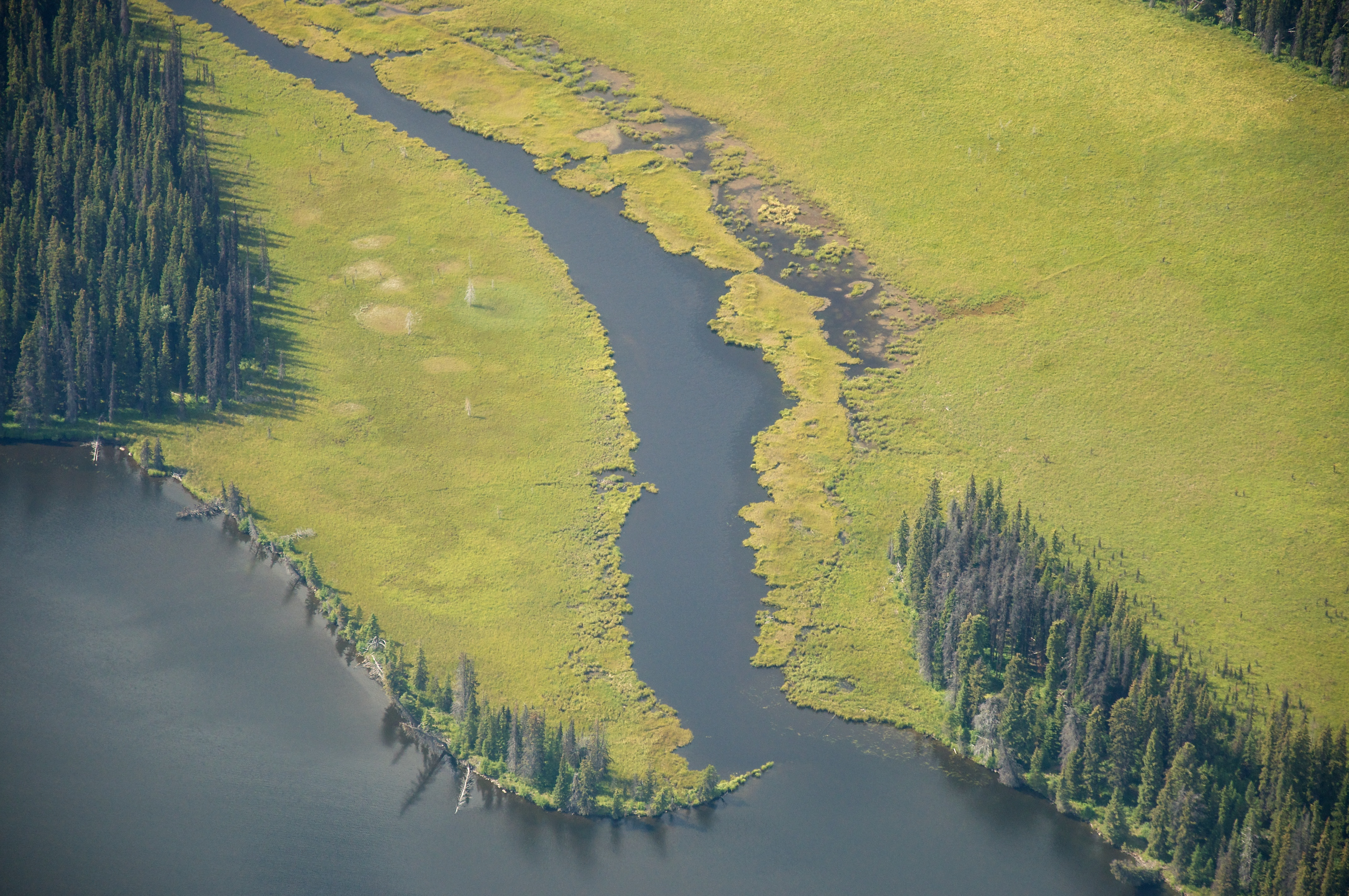
- Headwaters of Dean River

- Location of mouth

Location
- Country: Canada
- State: British Columbia
- Region: Coast Mountains, Kitimat Ranges
- District: Range 3 Coast Land District

Physical characteristics
- Source: Aktaklin Lake
  - location: Chilcotin Plateau, Canada
  - coordinates: 52°13′12″N 124°56′47″W
- Mouth: Dean Channel
  - location: Kimsquit, Canada
  - coordinates: 52°48′18″N 126°58′06″W
- Length: 253 km (157 mi)
- Basin size: 8,752 km^{2} (3,379 sq mi)
- Discharge
  - location: Near mouth
  - average: 136 m^{3}/s (4,800 cu ft/s)

The Dean River is one of the major rivers of the Kitimat Ranges subrange of the southern Coast Mountains in British Columbia. It begins at Aktaklin Lake on the Chilcotin Plateau and winds north around the Rainbow Range to enter Dean Channel at the now-uninhabited, remote community of Kimsquit. It is one of the few rivers to fully penetrate the wall of the Coast Mountains between the Fraser's mouth (near Vancouver) and the mouth of the Skeena River (near Prince Rupert).

The Dean River is known as one of the best fisheries for steelhead in the world.

== See also ==
- List of rivers of British Columbia
