= Porcher Island =

Island in British Columbia, Canada

Native name: K'paal
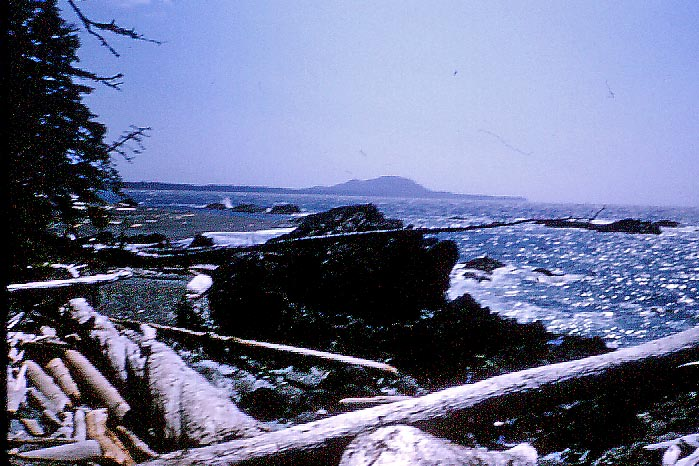
- Oval Bay, Porcher Island
- Interactive map of Porcher Island

Geography
- Location: Hecate Strait
- Coordinates: 53°59′02″N 130°31′29″W
- Area: 520 km^{2} (200 sq mi)
- Coastline: 170 km (106 mi)
- Highest elevation: 888.5 m (2915 ft)
- Highest point: Egeria Mountain

Administration
- Canada
- Province: British Columbia
- Land District: Range 5 Coast Land District
- Regional District: Skeena-Queen Charlotte Regional District

Demographics
- Population: 37 (2006)
- Pop. density: 0.071/km^{2} (0.184/sq mi)

Porcher Island (Tsimshian: K'paal) is an island in Hecate Strait, British Columbia, Canada, near the mouth of the Skeena River and southwest of the port city of Prince Rupert. The locality of Porcher Island is located near the island's northern tip at Humpback Bay, 54°05′11″N 130°23′23″W. Stephens and Prescott Islands are located off its northwestern tip.

== Features ==
=== Gitxaała Nii Łuutiksm/Kitkatla Conservancy ===
The conservancy was designated 14 July 2006, it has an area of 29,539 ha (114.05 sq mi) and contains the Porcher Peninsula and most of the seaward islands. The conservancy protects marine and terrestrial resources that have a history of use by First Nations peoples.

=== Porcher Inlet ===
Extending North from Kikatla, the inlet nearly bisects the southern island, it is a long, narrow channel that intrudes 13.7 km (8.5 mi) into the interior, before emptying into a salt lagoon at the foot of the Spiller Range.

=== Oval Bay ===
On the island's western edge, features a 5 km (3.1 mi) sandy beach, which is exposed to the ferocious southeast gales that regularly sweep through Hecate Strait.

=== Spiller Range ===
At the northeast end of the island, and reaches an elevation of 727 metres (2,385 ft).

== Etymology ==
Named after Edwin Augustus Porcher, RN (1821–1878), who served as Commander of HMS Sparrowhawk at Esquimalt Naval Base, Vancouver Island, from the spring of 1865 until he returned to England in the fall of 1868. While serving with the North Pacific Squadron, Commander Porcher made four summertime voyages to the North Coast of British Columbia; in 1866, 1867 and twice in 1868. The route of the Inside Passage that the Sparrowhawk took from Esquimalt to the Hudson's Bay Company trading post at Fort Simpson (the Tsimshian village of Lax Kw'alaams) would have passed close by the island in Chatham Sound that now bears the Commander's name.

== Geography ==
With a land area of 200 sq mi (518 km^{2}), Porcher Island is the eighth largest coastal island in British Columbia. The island's northern tip is 24 km (14.9 mi) southwest of the port city of Prince Rupert, and 70 km (43.5 mi) due south of the southernmost extension of the Alaska Panhandle. The island is located within the Range 5 Coast Land District and the Skeena-Queen Charlotte Regional District. Porcher Island is bounded on the north by Chatham Sound and the Skeena River estuary, by Hecate Strait to the west and by Ogden Channel to the south. Metlakata Inlet and Kitkatla Channel separate Porcher's southern flank from the Goschen, Dolphin and Spicer Islands, near the entrance to Principe Channel.

The interior of the island is hilly, Egeria Mountain, southeast of Porcher Inlet, is the tallest reaching to 888 m (2,915 ft), while the Bell Range dominates to the northwest.

== Geology ==
Porcher Island is underlain by the metamorphosed volcanic, volcaniclastic, and sedimentary rocks of the southern Alexander Terrane, which are intruded by ordovician plutons including the: Porcher Inlet, Hunt Inlet, McMicking, and Swede Point plutons.

== History ==
The Gitxaala have identified this island as part the laxyuup (traditional territories and waters).

The island's relative isolation, combined with wet, cool summers and severe winters, has discouraged many of those who sought to make Porcher Island their permanent home. After a brief influx of homesteaders, (in the wake of Prince Rupert being chosen as the terminus of the Grand Trunk Pacific Railway in 1906) three settlements were established during the 20th century that still sustain inhabitants today. These settlements are to be found at Hunts Inlet (formerly Jap Inlet) and at Humpback Bay, both on the island's northernmost tip, and at Oona River, which flows into Ogden Channel at the island's eastern edge.

== Settlements ==
The island, together with some of its surrounding area, (excluding Kitkatla (Laxklan), a Tsimshian village, is situated on Dolphin Island) had a population of 37 in the Canada 2006 Census, down 26% from the 2001 census.

=== Hunts Inlet ===
Hunts Inlet is a collection of older buildings grouped around a government dock, with the more recent addition of a number of vacation homes built by Prince Rupert residents.

=== Humback Bay ===
Gillnet Floats, Humpback Bay, Porcher Island, 1964

Humpback Bay is the site of the former Porcher Island Cannery, now derelict. The salmon cannery was originally built by the Chatham Sound Fishing and Packing Company in 1928, but operated for only four years before closing at the end of the 1932 salmon season. The site was later purchased by the Canadian Fishing Company and used as a summer gillnet station until 1968, when gillnet operations were transferred to North Pacific Cannery. Humpback Bay continued to serve as a net storage facility until the 1980s, when the Crown lease was sold to private interests.

=== Oona River ===
With 30 or so permanent residents, Oona River currently has the largest population of the three surviving Porcher Island settlements. Situated at the northern end of Ogden Channel, Oona River was originally settled by Scandinavian immigrants in the years before and after the First World War. The village has long been a source of wooden boats for the B.C. salmon fishing industry. Scores of these sturdy, seaworthy vessels were hand-built from red and yellow cedar by early settlers and their descendants, and some can still be seen in use today. The Oona River Salmon Enhancement Project, first established some 25 years ago, continues to rebuild threatened coho salmon stocks in the Porcher Island area.

== Ecology ==
Porcher Island is part of the Hecate Lowland Ecosection, a once heavily glaciated band of narrow lowland rain forest and coastal archipelago that stretches from Portland Inlet in the north to Queen Charlotte Strait in the south. Hecate Lowland terrain is generally rough and rocky, with wide areas of muskeg wetland and bog forest. Tree species include western red cedar, yellow cedar, mountain hemlock and fir. Salal, ferns, and skunk cabbage are commonly found undergrowth. Lowland climate in the Porcher Island region is dominated by frontal flows from Dixon Entrance, resulting in frequent wind storms and heavy rainfall.

Porcher Island Cannery

Waterfowl are found in abundance throughout the protected inlets and estuaries that notch Porcher Island's 100 mile coastline. Species include Merganser, Surfbird, Marbled Murrelet, Glaucous-winged gull, Northwest heron, Red-Throated Loon, Rhinoceros auklet, Greater white-fronted goose and Northern bald eagle. Both Chatham Sound and Kitkatla Channel afford a profusion of breeding and nesting habitat for a wide variety of seabirds, and are essential components of the Pacific coast migratory flyway.
