= Lowe Inlet Marine Provincial Park =

Provincial park in British Columbia, Canada

- IUCN category II (national park)
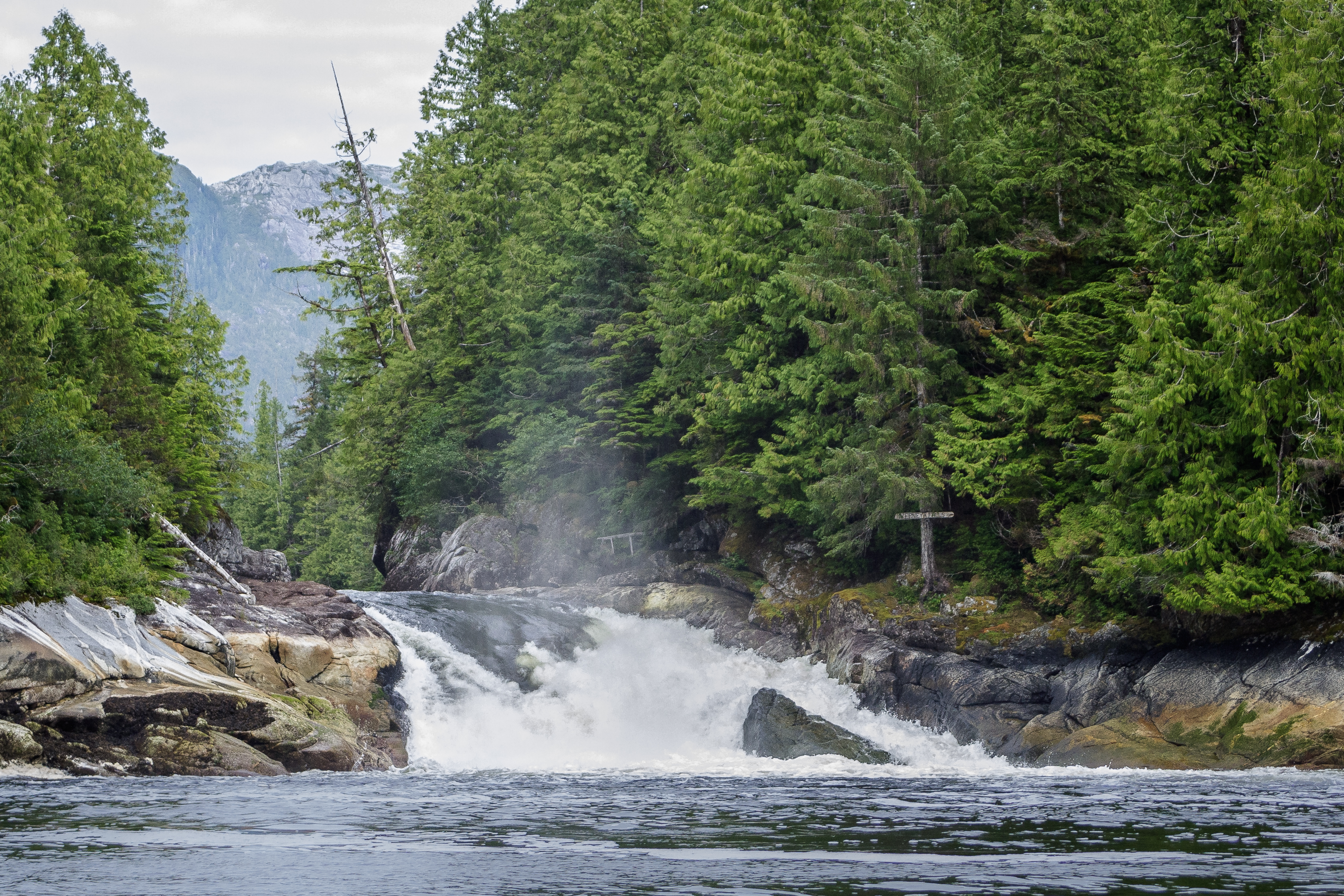
- Verney Falls at the head of Lowe Inlet

- Location within British Columbia
- Interactive map of Lowe Inlet Marine Provincial Park
- Location: British Columbia, Canada
- Nearest city: Prince Rupert, BC
- Coordinates: 53.5564°N 129.5875°W
- Area: 765 hectares (1,890 acres)
- Established: 14 June 1994
- Governing body: BC Parks

Lowe Inlet Marine Provincial Park is a provincial park in British Columbia, Canada located on the Inside Passage of the North Coast, 118 km south of Prince Rupert and 75 km north of Butedale. Established on 14 June 1994, the park now contains approximately 765 hectares (1,890 acres) (555 hectares (1,370 acres) of upland and 210 hectares (520 acres) of foreshore).

== Images ==
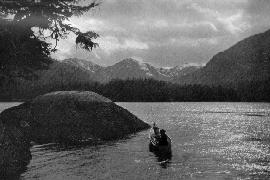
Lowe Inlet
