= Dean Channel =

Part of an inlet in British Columbia, Canada

Coordinates: 52°28′44″N 127°14′22″W

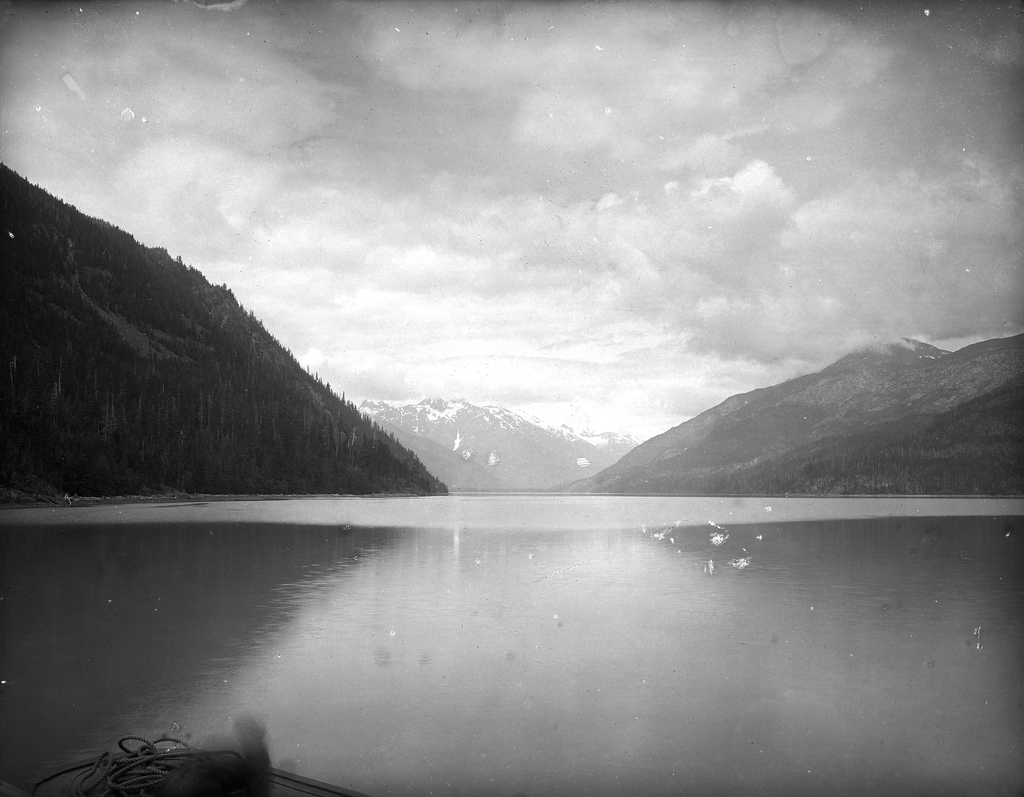
The head of the Dean Channel at the Kimsquit River delta

Dean Channel is the upper end of one of the longest inlets of the British Columbia Coast, 105 km (65.2 mi) from its head at the mouth of the Kimsquit River. The Dean River, one of the main rivers of the Coast Mountains, enters Dean Channel about 9.5 km (5.9 mi) below the head of the inlet, at the community of Kimsquit.

== History ==
Dean Channel was named by Captain Vancouver in 1793 after Rev. James King, Dean of Raphoe, Ireland. The channel was surveyed by Captain Richards in 1861 of HMS Hecate. It is located within the Central Coast region.

== Branches ==
Ending at the mouth of Cousins Inlet, which is the harbour for the abandoned town of Ocean Falls, the fjord's name changes to Fisher Channel down the west side of King Island. Below Fisher Channel's 40 km (25 mi) length the fjord merges with Burke Channel, which is a 70 km (43 mi) arm of the Dean/Fisher Channel on the east side of King Island, the name of the fjord changes to Fitz Hugh Sound, which is considerably wider than the upper part of the fjord at about 10 km (6.2 mi) in width and is itself about 60 km (37 mi) in length. Fitz Hugh Sound passes on the inside of Calvert Island and opens onto Queen Charlotte Sound just northwest of the opening of Queen Charlotte Strait.

Opening onto Fitz Hugh Sound in its lower reaches near Queen Charlotte Sound is Rivers Inlet, home of the Wuikinuxv (Owekeeno) First Nations. The total length of the fjord from the head of Dean Channel to the mouth of Fitz Hugh Sound is about 170 km (110 mi) rivalling Hardangerfjord in Norway for length. If the additional lengths of South Bentinck Arm (45 km, 28 mi) and North Bentinck Arm (30 km, 19 mi), plus Burke Channel and its shorter companion, Labouchere Channel (15 km, 9.3 mi), and an arm of Burke named Kwatna Inlet (25 km, 16 mi) were factored in, total length of the fjord complex's waterways is 335 km (208 mi) - longer than Sognefjord's 203 km (126 mi) and rivalling Greenland's Scoresby Sound's 350 km (220 mi).

=== North Bentinck Arm ===
A side-inlet of Burke Channel, North Bentinck Arm, is noteworthy as the place where the overland expedition by fur trade explorer Alexander Mackenzie reached the sea, on July 20, 1793. Wanting to see the open ocean, Mackenzie and four Nuxalk people went by canoe the next day to Dean Channel. Mackenzie did not reach the open ocean, stopping at the ruins of an old Heiltsuk village on the north side of Dean Channel. There he wrote his name on a rock, which today is part of Sir Alexander Mackenzie Provincial Park. Mackenzie did not know that he arrived just a few weeks after Captain George Vancouver visited Dean Channel and North Bentinck Arm.

The town of Bella Coola is at the head of North Bentinck Arm; Bella Coola is an English adaptation of the Heiltsuk name for the Nuxalk (whose name in their own language means the Bella Coola River and its valley). Bella Coola is the only community on the coast between Vancouver and Kitimat, to have road access to the rest of the province, via British Columbia Highway 20 to Williams Lake via the Chilcotin region.
