= Kitimat Ranges =

Subrange of the Coast Mountains in British Columbia, Canada

- French: Chaînons Kitimat
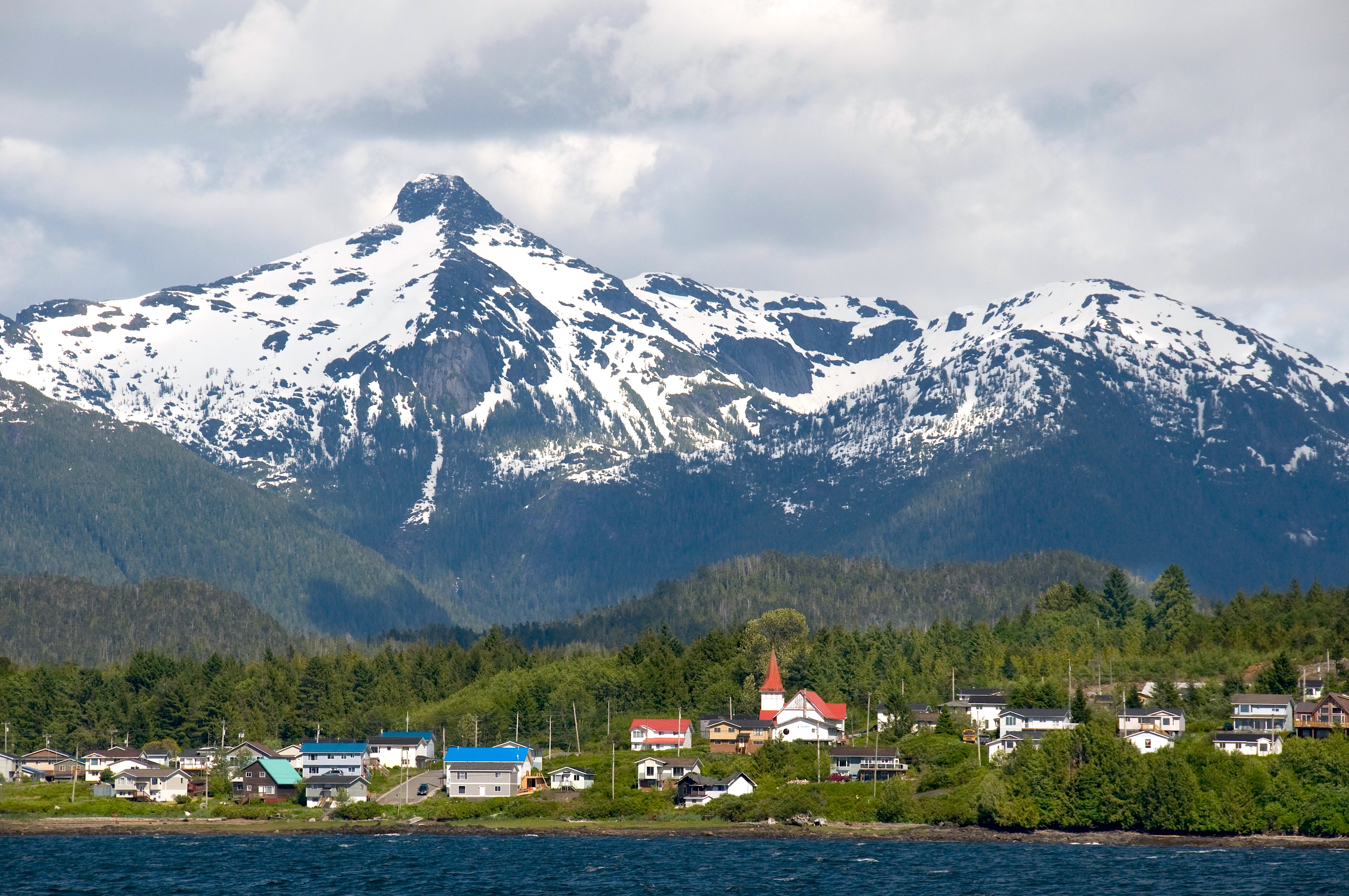
- Lax Kw'alaams backdropped by Mount McNeil

Highest point
- Peak: Howson Peak
- Elevation: 2,759 m (9,052 ft)
- Coordinates: 53°50′N 128°30′W

Dimensions
- Area: 62,777 km^{2} (24,238 mi^{2})

Geography
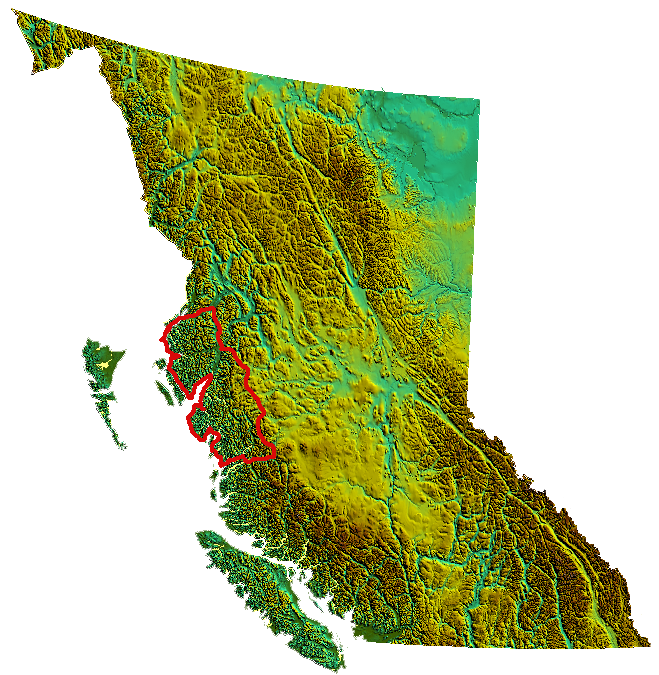
- Kitimat Ranges as defined in S. Holland Landforms of British Columbia
- Location: British Columbia, Canada
- Range coordinates: 53°49′59″N 128°30′05″W
- Parent range: Coast Mountains

The Kitimat Ranges are one of the three main subdivisions of the Coast Mountains in British Columbia, Canada, the others being the Pacific Ranges to the south and the Boundary Ranges to the north.

== Geography ==
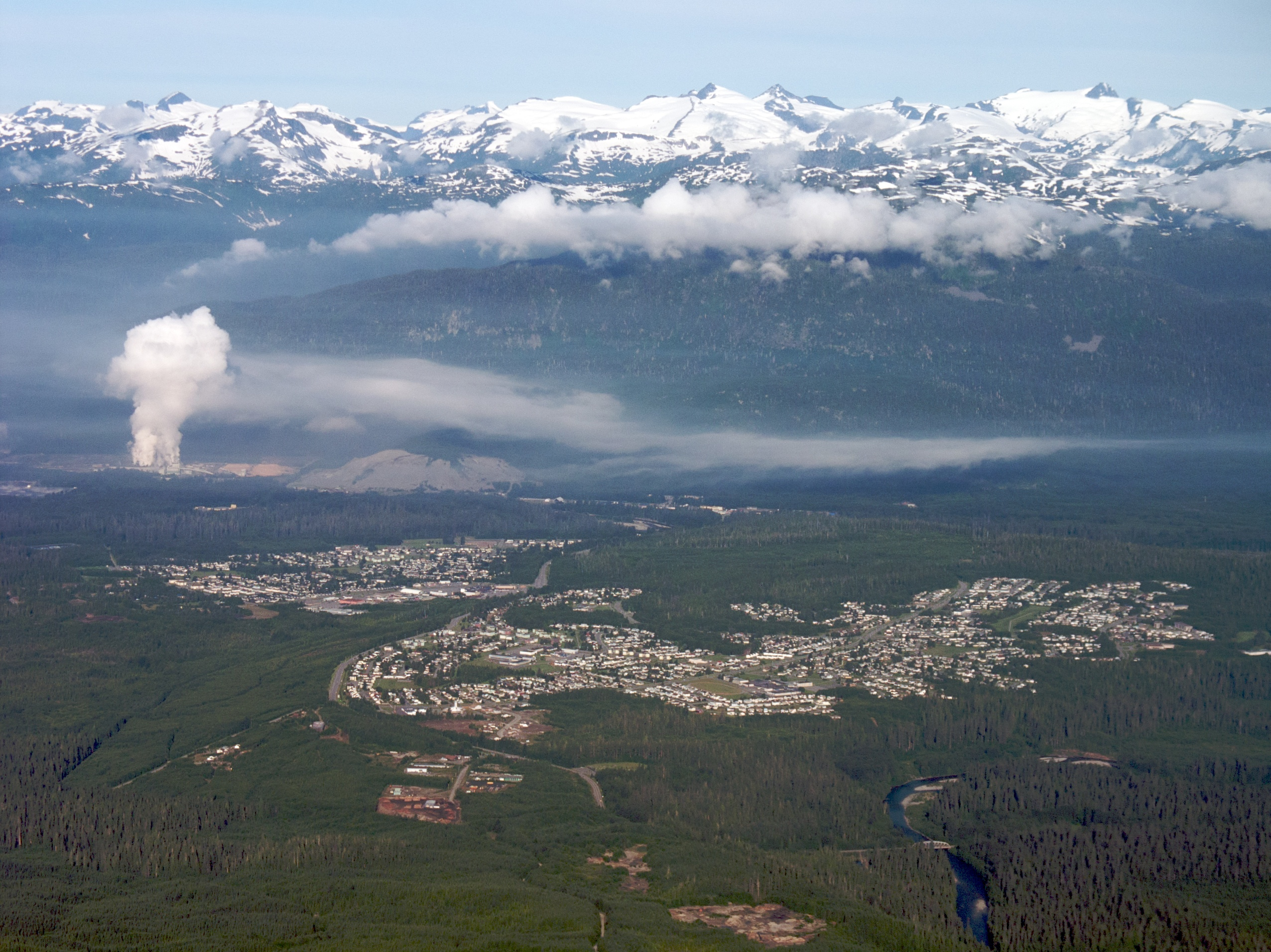
The Kitimat Ranges, rising behind Kitimat, British Columbia

The Kitimat Ranges lie between the Nass River and Portland Inlet in the north and the Bella Coola River and Burke Channel on the south, and are bounded on their east by the Hazelton Mountains and include the mountainous islands of the North Coastal Archipelago, as well as King Island, which lies between Dean Channel and the aforesaid Burke Channel. Some of those islands are part of a separate formation known as the Coastal Trough.

Although lower than the neighbouring Pacific Ranges to the south, they are in some ways more rugged, and are heavily indented by coastal inlets as well as by fjord-like lake valleys on the Interior side of the range.

== Sub-ranges ==
- Bare Top Range
- Countess of Dufferin Range
- Kitlope Range
- North Coastal Archipelago
  - Bell Range
  - Burnaby Range
  - Cape Range
  - Chismore Range
  - Murphy Range
  - Richardson Range
  - Spiller Range
  - Williams Range
  - Wimbledon Range
- Tenaiko Range

== Parks ==
- Exchamsiks River Provincial Park
- Tweedsmuir South Provincial Park
- Tweedsmuir North Provincial Park and Protected Area
- Kitimat River Provincial Park
- Kleanza Creek Provincial Park
- Khutzeymateen Grizzly Bear Sanctuary
- Nisga'a Memorial Lava Bed Provincial Park
- Kitlope Heritage Conservancy

== Rivers ==
Rivers within or originating in, or which transit the Kitimat Ranges, are:

- Brim River
- Dean River
- Ecstall River
- Exchamsiks River
- Kemano River
- Khtada River
- Khutze River
- Kitimat River
- Kitlope River
- Ksi X'anmas
- McNeil River
- Scotia River
- Skeena River

== See also ==
- Mountain ranges of British Columbia
- North American Cordillera
