= Kimsquit =

Former village in British Columbia

Kimsquit is a former village of the Nuxalk at the mouth of the Dean River on the northeast side of Dean Channel in the Central Coast region of British Columbia, Canada. Kemsquit Indian Reserve No. 1 is nearby at 52°49′00″N 126°58′00″W, which is on Kimsquit Bay; Kimsquit Mountain is nearby.

The village was shelled by the H.M.S Rocket Royal Navy in 1877. Kimsquit was subsequently rebuilt by the federal government working through the department of indian after a payout of 1,200 dollars was approved for its reconstruction.
