= List of rivers of British Columbia =

The following is a partial list of rivers of British Columbia, organized by watershed. Some large creeks are included either because of size or historical importance (See Alphabetical List of British Columbia rivers ). Also included are lakes that are "in-line" connecting upper tributaries of listed rivers, or at their heads.

== Arctic drainage ==
Arctic Ocean via Mackenzie River drainage

(NB Liard tributaries on Yukon side of border omitted)

=== Liard River watershed ===
- Liard River
  - Petitot River
  - Fort Nelson River
    - Sahtaneh River
      - Snake River
    - Muskwa River
      - Prophet River
        - Minaker River
        - Besa River
      - Tetsa River
      - Chischa River
      - Tuchodi River
    - Sikanni Chief River
      - Buckinghorse River
    - Fontas River
  - Dunedin River
  - Beaver River
  - Toad River
    - West Toad River
    - Racing River
    - Schipa River
  - Grayling River
  - Trout River
  - Vents River
  - Smith River
  - Coal River
  - Rabbit River
    - Gundahoo River
  - Kechika River
    - Red River
    - Turnagain River
      - Major Hart River
      - Dall River
      - Cassiar River
    - Gataga River
    - Frog River
  - Dease River
    - Cottonwood River
    - Blue River
    - Rapid River
  - Little Rancheria River

=== Hay River ===
- Kotcho River
- Chinchaga River

=== Peace River ===
- Redwillow River (Smoky River, Alberta, drainage)
- Wapiti River (Smoky River, Alberta, drainage)
  - Narraway River
- Pouce Coupe River
- Alces River
- Kiskatinaw River
  - West Kiskatinaw River
- Beatton River
  - Doig River
    - Osborn River
  - Blueberry River
- Pine River
  - Murray River
    - Wolverine River
  - Sukunka River
- Moberly River
  - Moberly Lake
- Halfway River
  - Cameron River
  - Graham River
  - Chowade River
- Nabesche River
- Wicked River

==== Williston Lake (Parsnip Reach) ====
- Manson River
- Nation River
- Pack River
  - McLeod Lake
    - Crooked River
      - Summit Lake
    - McLeod River
      - Carp Lake
- Parsnip River
  - Misinchinka River

==== Williston Lake (Omineca Reach) ====
- Omineca River
  - Mesilinka River
  - Osilinka River
- Ingenika River
  - Swannell River

==== Williston Lake (Finlay Reach) ====
- Ospika River
- Finlay River
  - Akie River
  - Kwadacha River
    - Warneford River
    - North Kwadacha River
  - Fox River
    - McCook River
  - Obo River
  - Toodoggone River
  - Firesteel River
    - Sturdee River
    - Thutade Lake - Source of the Peace River

== Pacific drainage ("Pacific Slope") ==
(Pacific Ocean watershed; Columbia tributaries on US side of border omitted)

=== Columbia River watershed ===
- Columbia River
  - Horsethief Creek
  - Forster Creek
  - Templeton River
  - Spillimacheen River
  - Kicking Horse River
      - Little Yoho River
    - Yoho River
    - Emerald River
      - Kiwetinok River
    - Amiskwi River
    - Otterhead River
    - Ottertail River
      - Ice River
    - Beaverfoot River
  - Blaeberry River
  - Beaver River
  - Bush River
    - Valenciennes River
  - Wood River
  - Canoe River
  - Goldstream River
    - Palmer Creek
  - Illecillewaet River
  - Incomappleux River
  - Beaton Creek
  - Kootenay River
    - Vermilion River
    - Cross River
    - Palliser River
    - Lussier River
    - St. Mary River
    - Wild Horse River
    - Bull River
    - Elk River
      - Fording River
      - Coal Creek
      - Wigwam River
    - Yahk River
    - Moyie River
    - Goat River
    - Duncan River
      - Lardeau River
    - Slocan River
      - Little Slocan River
      - Percy Creek (Slocan River)
    - White River
  - Pend d'Oreille River
    - Flathead River (via the Clark Fork)
    - Salmo River
  - Kettle River
    - Granby River
    - West Kettle River
  - Okanagan River
    - Similkameen River
      - Pasayten River
      - Tulameen River
        - Britton Creek
    - Shingle Creek
    - Mission Creek
    - Whiteman Creek
- Marron River

=== Strait of Georgia ===
==== Howe Sound ====
- Rainy River
- Deeks Creek
- Lions Creek
- M Creek
- Furry Creek
- Britannia Creek
- Shannon Creek
- Woodfibre Creek
- Stawamus River
- Squamish River
  - Mamquam River
    - Ring Creek
    - Skookum Creek
  - Cheakamus River
    - Cheekye River
      - Brohm River
      - Rubble Creek
      - Daisy Lake
        - Cheakamus River
          - Brandywine Creek
            - Cheakamus Lake
              - Cheakamus River
            - Alpha Lake Creek
              - Alpha Lake
                - Nita Creek
                  - Nita Lake
                    - Whistler Creek
          - Callaghan Creek
  - Ashlu Creek
  - Elaho River
    - Clendinning Creek

==== Jervis Inlet ====
- Vancouver River
- Deserted River
- Loquilts Creek
- Skwawka River
  - Alfred Creek
- Brittain River

===== Sechelt Inlet =====
- Clowhom River
- Tzoonie River

==== Malaspina Strait ====
- Lois River
- Powell River
  - Powell Lake
    - Daniels River

==== Desolation Sound watershed ====
===== Theodosia Inlet =====
- Theodosia River

===== Toba Inlet =====
- Toba River
- Tahumming River

=== Bute Inlet ===
- Homathko River
  - Tatlayoko Lake
  - Mosley Creek
- Southgate River
  - Bishop River

=== Knight Inlet ===
- Klinaklini River
  - West Klinaklini River
  - McClinchy Creek
  - One Eye Lake

=== North Bentinck Arm/Dean Channel ===
- Necleetsconnay River
- Bella Coola River
  - Atnarko River
    - Hotnarko River
  - Talchako River
  - Salloomt River
  - Nusatsum River
  - Noosgulch River
- Dean River
  - Sakumtha River
  - Takia River
- Kimsquit River

==== South Bentinck Arm ====
- Asseek River
- Taleomey River
- Noeick River

== Seaforth Channel to Princess Royal Island ==
- Tankeeah River
- Mussel River
- Carter River
- Khutze River
- Aaltanhash River
- McIsaac River
- Klekane River
- Goat River

=== Douglas Channel/Gardner Canal ===
- Tsaytis River
- Kitlope River
  - Gamsby River
  - Kapella River
  - Kitlope Lake
    - Tezwa River
- Kitkiata Inlet
  - Quaal River
- Kemano River
- Kitimat River

=== Fraser River - Source to the Willow River ===
- Moose River
- Moose Lake
- Robson River
- Swiftcurrent Creek
- McLennan River
- Tete Creek
- Kiwa Creek
- Raush River
- Holmes River
- Castle Creek
- Doré River
- McKale River
- West Twin Creek
- East Twin Creek
- Goat River
  - Milk River
- Morkill River
- Torpy River
- Bowron River
- McGregor River
  - Herrick Creek
- Salmon River
- Willow River

==== Nechako River ====
- Stuart River
  - Stuart Lake
    - Necoslie River
    - Pinchi Creek
      - Pinchi Lake
        - Tsilcoh River
        - Ocock River
    - Tachie River
      - Kuzkwa River
        - Tezzeron Lake
      - Trembleur Lake
        - Middle River
          - Takla Lake
            - Sakeniche River
              - Natowite Lake
            - Driftwood River
              - Kotsine River
- Endako River
  - Tchesinkut River
    - Tchesinkut Lake
  - Burns Lake
- Nautley River
  - Fraser Lake
    - Stellako River
      - François Lake
        - Nadina River
- Cheslatta River
  - Cheslatta Lake
  - Bryan Arm
  - Chelaslie Arm
- Nechako Reservoir
  - Tetachuck Lake
    - Allin Bay
      - Natalkuz Lake
      - Chedakuz Arm
        - Knewstubb Lake
              - Murray Lake
            - Euchu Reach
        - Entiako River
          - Entiako Lake
        - Chief Louis Arm
  - Ootsa Lake
    - Tahtsa Reach, Tahtsa Lake
      - Tahtsa River
    - Whitesail Lake
      - Zinc Bay
      - Little Whitesail Lake
        - Troitsa Lake
          - Troitsa River

==== Fraser River - Nechako to Thompson Rivers ====
- Cottonwood River
  - Swift River
    - John Boyd Creek
      - Mary Creek
- Quesnel River
  - Cariboo River
    - Little River
    - Matthew River
      - Lanezi Lake
      - Isaac Lake
        - Wolverine River
  - Quesnel Lake
    - Roaring River
    - Mitchell River
      - Mitchel Lake
    - Niagara Creek
    - Horsefly River
      - Horsefly Lake
- West Road or Blackwater River
- Soda Creek
  - Duckworth Lake
    - McLeese Creek
      - McLeese Lake
        - Sheridan Creek
- Williams Lake River
  - Missioner Creek
    - Reservoir Lake
  - Williams Lake
    - San Jose River
- Chilcotin River
  - Chilko River
    - Taseko River
      - Taseko Lake
        - Lord River
        - Tchaikazan River
    - Chilko Lake
      - Edmond River
    - Chilanko River
- Churn Creek
- Bridge River
  - Yalakom River
  - Carpenter Lake
    - Marshall Creek
      - Marshall Lake
    - Tyaughton Creek
        - Liza Creek
          - Liza Lake
      - Tyaughton Lake
        - Tyaughton Creek
          - Relay Creek
          - Noaxe Creek
    - Gun Creek
      - Lajoie Creek
        - Gun Lake
          - Lajoie Creek
            - Lajoie Lake
      - Leckie Creek
      - Slim Creek
  - Bridge River
    - Hurley River
      - Cadwallader Creek
    - Downton Lake
      - Bridge River
        - Nichols Creek
- Seton River or Seton Creek
  - Cayoosh Creek
    - Duffey Lake
      - Cayoosh Creek
  - Seton Lake
    - Seton River or Seton Portage River
      - Anderson Lake
        - McGillivray Creek
        - Haylmore Creek
        - Gates River
- Stein River

===== Thompson River =====
- Botanie Creek
- Nicoamen River
- Skoonka Creek
- Murray Creek
- Nicola River
  - Spius Creek
  - Coldwater River
  - Nicola Lake
    - Quilchena Creek
- Oregon Jack Creek
- Bonaparte River
  - Cache Creek
  - Hat Creek
  - Rayfield River
- Deadman River
- Kamloops Lake
  - Tranquille River
- South Thompson River
  - Monte Creek
  - Chase Creek
  - Little Shuswap Lake
    - Little River
      - Shuswap Lake
        - Adams River
        - Seymour River
        - Anstey River
        - Eagle River
          - Perry River
        - Sicamous Narrows
          - Mara Lake
            - Shuswap River
              - Mabel Lake
                - Wap Creek
              - Sugar Lake
                - Shuswap River
                  - Tsuius Creek
                  - Joss Creek
        - Salmon River
- North Thompson River
  - Barrière River
  - Clearwater River
    - Mahood River
      - Mahood Lake
        - Canim River
          - Canim Lake
            - Bridge Creek
    - Murtle River
    - Clearwater Lake
    - Azure River
      - Azure Lake
        - Angus Horne Lake
  - Raft River
  - Mad River
  - Blue River
  - Mud Creek
  - Thunder River
  - Albreda River

==== Fraser River below Thompson River ====
- Ainslie Creek (formerly Nine Mile Creek)
- Nahatlatch River
- Anderson River
- Coquihalla River
  - Nicolum River
- Ruby Creek
- Sumas River
  - Vedder River or Chilliwack River
    - Sweltzer River
    - Slesse Creek
    - Depot Creek
- Harrison River
  - Chehalis River
    - Chehalis Lake
  - Harrison Lake
    - Silver River
    - Tretheway Creek
    - Tipella Creek
    - Lillooet River
      - Sloquet Creek
      - Fire Creek
      - Snowcap Creek
      - Lillooet Lake
        - Joffre Creek
        - Birkenhead River
          - Birkenhead Lake
            - Taillefer Creek
        - Green River
          - Rutherford Creek
          - Soo River
          - Green Lake
              - Rainbow Creek
            - River of Golden Dreams or Alta Creek
              - Alta Lake
                - Brio Creek
            - Fitzsimmons Creek
        - Ryan River
        - Meager Creek
        - Salal Creek
- Norrish Creek
- Hatzic Slough
  - Hatzic Lake
    - Hatzic Creek
    - Durieu Creek
- D'Herbomez Creek
- Silver Creek
- Stave River
  - Silvermere Lake
  - Hayward Lake
    - Steelhead Creek
    - Stave Lake
      - McConnell Creek
      - Cascade Creek
      - Terepocki Creek
      - Winslow Creek
      - Tingle Creek
      - Stave River
        - Piluk Creek
- Whonnock Creek
- Kanaka Creek
  - McNutt Creek
- Pitt River
  - Alouette River
    - Alouette Lake
      - Gold Creek
  - Widgeon Creek
  - Pitt Lake
    - Pitt River
- Coquitlam River
  - Coquitlam Lake
- Brunette River
  - Burnaby Lake
    - Still Creek

==== Rivers of North Vancouver ====
- Capilano River
- Seymour River
- MacKay Creek
- Mosquito Creek
- Lynn Creek

=== Skagit Bay/Puget Sound (U.S.) ===
- Skagit River
  - Sumallo River
  - Ross Lake
    - Skagit River

=== Boundary Bay ===
- Nicomekl River
- Serpentine River
- Campbell River

=== English Bay ===
- Capilano River

==== Burrard Inlet ====
- Mosquito Creek
- Seymour River
- Lynn Creek
- Capilano River
- Mackay Creek
- Marr Creek
- Lawson Creek
- Cypress Creek
- Eagle Creek
- Nelson Creek

===== Indian Arm =====
- Percy Creek (Indian Arm)
- Buntzen Lake (via tunnels)
- Indian River

=== Watersheds East of the Alaska Panhandle ===
(south and east of the Chilkoot Pass)

- Salmon River
- Unuk River (Alaska and British Columbia)
  - Eulachon River (Alaska)
  - Blue River (Alaska)
    - Lava Fork (AK and BC)
      - Lava Lakes
  - Hell Roaring Creek (Alaska)
  - Harrymel Creek
    - King Creek
  - South Unuk River
    - Gracey Creek
  - Sulphurets Creek
- Stikine River
  - Kikahe River
  - Katete River (source is in Alaska)
    - West Fork Katete River
  - Tasakili River
  - Iskut River
    - Johnson River
    - Inhini River
    - Hoodoo River
    - Craig River
      - Jekill River
    - Twin River
    - Verrett River
    - Snippaker Creek
    - McLymont Creek
    - Forrest Kerr Creek
    - Volcano Creek
    - Ningunsaw River
      - Bob Quinn Creek
      - Alger Creek
      - Beaverpond Creek
    - Devil Creek
    - More Creek
    - Ball Creek
    - Burrage Creek
    - Little Iskut River
      - Bourgeaux Creek
        - Gerlib Creek
      - Stewbomb Creek
        - Artifact Creek
    - Todagin Creek
      - Tsatia Creek
  - Choquette River
  - Porcupine River
  - Flood River
  - Scud River
  - Chutine River
    - Barrington River
  - Mess Creek
    - Dagaichess Creek
    - Elwyn Creek
      - Kadeya Creek
    - Crayke Creek
    - Taweh Creek
      - Sezill Creek
    - Schaft Creek
      - Hickman Creek
        - Helicopter Creek
    - Raspberry Creek
      - Walkout Creek
        - Flyin Creek
    - Kitsu Creek
      - Nagha Creek
    - Tadekho Creek
  - Tahltan River
    - Hartz Creek
    - Middle Creek
      - Riley Creek
    - Beatty Creek
    - Bear Creek
    - Little Tahltan River
  - Tuya River
    - Classy Creek
    - Little Tuya River
      - Mansfield Creek
  - Klastline River
    - Kakiddi Creek
      - Tsecha Creek
      - Pyramid Creek
      - Tenchen Creek
      - Nido Creek
      - Tennaya Creek
      - Sorcery Creek
      - Shaman Creek
        - Chakima Creek
  - Tanzilla River
  - Klappan River
    - Little Klappan River
  - McBride River
  - Kehlechoa River
  - Pitman River
    - Tucho River
  - Spatsizi River
    - Ross River
    - Dawson River
    - Kluayetz Creek
  - Chukachida River
- Whiting River (estuary is in Alaska)
  - South Whiting River
- Taku River
  - Sittakanay River (confluence with the Taku is in Alaska)
  - Tulsequah River
  - Inklin River (joins Nakina River to form Taku River)
    - Yeth Creek
    - Sutlahine River
    - Sheslay River (joins Nahlin River to form Inklin River)
      - Tatsatua Creek
      - Samotua River
      - Hackett River
    - Nahlin River (joins Sheslay River to form Inklin River)
      - Dudidontu River
      - Koshin River
  - Nakina River (joins Inklin River to form Taku River)
    - Sloko River
      - Nakonake River
    - Silver Salmon River

=== Watersheds North of the Alaska Panhandle ===
(west of the Chilkoot Pass)

- Alsek River (mouth in Alaska, source at confluence of Kaskawulsh and Dezadeash Rivers in Yukon Territory)
  - Tatshenshini River (BC and Yukon)
    - Tkope River
    - O'Connor River
    - Klukshu River (Yukon Territory)
    - Blanchard River (BC and Yukon)
    - Parton River
  - Bates River (Yukon)
  - Kaskawulsh River (Yukon)
    - Dusty River (Yukon)
    - Jarvis River (Yukon)
  - Dezadeash River (Yukon)
    - Aishihik River (Yukon)
    - Dezadeash Lake (Yukon)
- Chilcat River (sp. Chilkat in Alaska)
- Flemer River
  - Tahini River (NB different from Takhini River, which is in same area and runs the other way)
- Kelsall River
  - Kelsall Lake (Glacier Camp Pass)
- Klehini River

=== Marcus Passage watershed ===
- Oriflamme Passage
  - Portland Inlet
    - Khutzeymateen Inlet
      - Khutzeymateen River
        - Kateen River
    - Ksi X'anmas or Kwinamass River
    - Nass Bay, Mill Bay
      - Ksi Gingolx or Kincolith River
      - Nass River
        - Xnukw or Iknouk River
        - Ishkheenickh River or Ksi Hlginx
        - Vetter Creek
        - Ksi Sii Aks, formerly Tseax River
          - Crater Creek
        - Kwinatahl River or Ksi Gwinhat'al
        - Tchitin River
        - Kinskuch River
        - Cranberry River
          - Kiteen River
        - White River
          - Flat River
        - Meziadin River, Meziadin Lake
        - Bell-Irving River
          - Bowser River, Bowser Lake
          - Treaty Creek
        - Kwinageese River
        - Taylor River
          - West Taylor River
    - Portland Canal
      - Bear River
    - Observatory Inlet
      - Alice Arm
        - Illiance River
        - Kitsault River
          - Dak River
            - West Kitsault River
      - Hastings Arm
        - Kshwan River
- 'Skeena River'
  - McNeil River
  - Ayton Creek
  - Ecstall River
  - Windsor River
  - Khyex River
  - Scotia River
  - Khtada River
  - Kasiks River
  - Exchamsiks River
  - Gitnadoix River
  - Exstew River
  - Shames River
  - Lakelse River
    - Lakelse Lake, Furlong Bay
  - Zymagotitz River
  - Kitsumkalum River
    - Kitsumkalum Lake
      - Nelson River
      - Kitsumkalum River
        - Cedar River
  - Zymoetz River
    - Clore River
      - Burnie River
    - Kitnayakwa River
  - Kitwanga River
  - Kitseguecla River
  - Bulkley River
    - Suskwa River
    - Telkwa River
      - Toboggan Creek
    - Morice River
      - Thautil River
      - Morice Lake, Atna Bay
        - Nanika River
        - Atna River
  - Kispiox River
    - Sweetin River
    - Nangeese River
    - East Kispiox River
  - Shegunia River
  - Babine River
    - Shelagyote River
    - Nilkitkwa River
      - West Nilkitkwa River
    - Babine Lake
      - Fulton River
      - Sutherland River
  - Sicintine River
  - Slamgeesh River
  - Squinguila River
  - Sustut River
    - Bear River
    - Asitka River
  - Mosque River
  - Duti River
  - Kluatantan River

=== Queen Charlotte Sound watershed ===
==== Douglas Channel watershed ====
- Gardner Canal
    - Alan Reach
      - Kiltuish Inlet
        - Kiltuish River
    - Europa Reach
      - Brim River
    - Barrie Reach
      - Kemano River
    - Whidbey Reach
      - Chief Matthews Bay
        - Kowesas River
      - Kitlope River
        - Tsaytis River
        - Kitlope Lake
          - Tezwa River
            - Kalitan Creek
        - Gamsby River
          - Tenaiko Creek
        - Kapella River
  - Kitimat Arm
    - Kitimat River
    - Kildala Arm
      - Kildala River
    - Watt Creek

==== Dean Channel watershed ====
- Kimsquit River
- Dean River
- Burke Channel
  - Kwatna Inlet
    - Quatlena River
    - Kwatna River (via Kwatna Bay)
- North Bentinck Arm
  - Bella Coola River
    - Atnarko River
      - Talchako River
  - Necleetsconnay River
- South Bentinck Arm
  - Taleomey River
  - Noeick River
    - Smitley River

==== Queen Charlotte Strait watershed ====
- Knight Inlet
  - Klinaklini River
    - West Klinaklini River
- Namu River
- Koeye River
- Rivers Inlet
  - Wannock River
    - Owikeno Lake
      - Sheemahant River
      - Machmell River
        - Neechantz River
      - Tzeo River
        - Washwash River
      - Inziana River
- Kingcome Inlet
  - Kingcome River
    - Atlatzi River
    - Clear River
    - Satsalla River
  - Wakeman Sound
    - Wakeman River
      - Atwaykellesse River
- Tribune Channel
  - Bond Sound
    - Ahta River
  - Thompson Sound
  - Kakweiken River

=== Islands of the British Columbia Coast watersheds ===
- Canoona River (Princess Royal Island)

==== Rivers of Vancouver Island ====
===== Broughton Strait–Queen Charlotte Strait watersheds =====
- Kokish River
- Nimpkish River
  - Nimpkish Lake
  - Woss Creek
  - Davie River
- Keogh River
- Quatsie River
- Tsuiquate River
- Shushartie River
- Nahwitti River
- Stranby River

===== Discovery Passage–Johnstone Strait watersheds =====
- Campbell River
  - Quinsam River
    - Iron River
      - Chute Creek
  - John Hart Lake
  - Lower Campbell Lake
    - Greenstone Creek
  - Upper Campbell Lake
    - Elk River
      - Cervus Creek
  - Buttle Lake
    - Wolf River
    - Ralph River
      - Shepherd Creek
    - Myra Creek
    - Thelwood Creek
- Salmon River
  - White River
  - Memkay River
    - Middle Memkay River
    - North Memkay River
- Adam River
  - Eve River
- Tsitika River

===== Strait of Georgia watersheds =====
- Goldstream River
  - Goldstream Lake
- Shawnigan River
  - Shawnigan Lake
- Koksilah River
- Cowichan River
  - Cowichan Lake
    - Robertson River
- Chemainus River
  - Chipman Creek
- Nanaimo River
  - Sadie Creek
  - South Nanaimo River
    - Jump Creek
    - Dunsmuir Creek
  - North Nanaimo River
  - Haslam Creek
    - North Haslam Creek
- Chase River
- Englishman River
  - South Englishman River
- Little Qualicum River
  - Cameron Lake
    - Cameron River
- Qualicum River
  - Horne Lake
- Tsable River
- Trent River
  - Bloedel Creek
- Courtenay River
  - Puntledge River
    - Browns River
  - Tsolum River
  - Comox Lake
    - Cruickshank River
      - Comox Creek
- Oyster River
  - Little Oyster River
  - Piggott Creek

===== West Coast of Vancouver Island watersheds =====
====== Alberni Inlet-Barkley Sound ======
- Black River
- Pachena River
- Sarita River
  - South Sarita River
- Franklin River
  - Corrigan Creek
- China Creek
- Somass River
  - Stamp River
    - Ash River
    - Great Central Lake
      - Drinkwater Creek
  - Sproat River
    - Sproat Lake
      - Taylor River

====== Clayoquot Sound ======
- Cous Creek
- Nahmint River
- Effingham River
- Toquart River
- Kennedy River
  - Kennedy Lake
    - Clayoquot River
    - Sand River
- Tofino Creek
- Bedwell River
  - Ursus Creek
- Cypress River
- Moyena River
- Atleo River
- Megin River
  - Talbot Creek
- Sydney River
- Hesquiat River
  - Hesquiat Lake
- Houston River
  - Jacklah River
- Burman River
  - Bancroft Creek

====== Nootka Sound ======
- Gold River
  - Ucana River
    - Donner Lake
  - Heber River
    - Saunders Creek
  - Upana River
  - Muchalat River
    - Muchalat Lake
      - Oktwanch River
- Tlupana River
  - Nesook River
- Conuma River
- Sucowa River
- Leiner River
- Tahsis River
- Zeballos River
  - Nomash River
- Kaouk River
- Artlish River
- Tahsish River
  - Kwois Creek
- Marble River
  - Alice Lake
    - Benson River
      - Raging River
  - Victoria Lake
    - Teihsum River
- Waukwaas River
- Goodspeed River
- MacJack River
- San Josef River
- Fisherman River

====== Strait of Juan de Fuca watersheds ======
- Darling River
- Klanawa River
  - East Klanawa River
- Nitinat River
  - Nitinat Lake
    - Caycuse River
  - Little Nitinat River
- Carmanah Creek
- Walbran Creek
- San Juan River
  - Gordon River
  - Fleet River
- Sombrio River
- Loss Creek
  - Jack Elliott Creek
  - Noyse Creek
- Jordan River
- Sooke River
  - Leech River
  - Sooke Lake
- Colquitz River

==== Haida Gwaii watersheds ====
- Ain River
- Hiellen River
- Salmon River
- Slatechuck Creek
- Tlell River
- Yakoun River

== Bering Sea (Yukon River) watershed ==
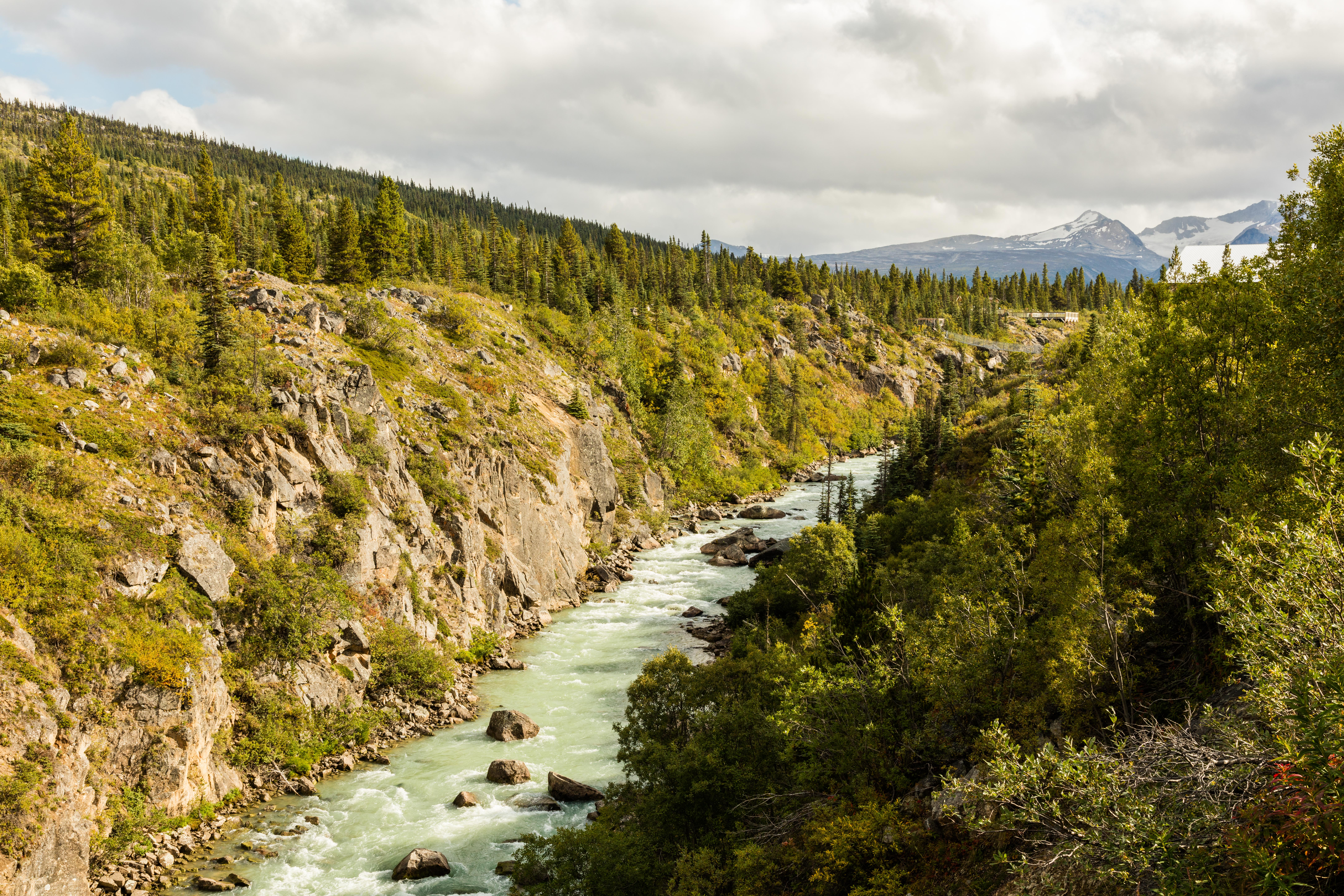
Tutshi River

Note that only tributaries of the Yukon River in British Columbia are given; those in Yukon or Alaska are omitted.

- Kusawa River
- Hendon River
- Takhini River
- Primrose River
- Partridge Lake
  - Partridge River
- Bennett Lake
  - Lake Lindeman
    - Lindeman Creek (from Chilkoot Pass)
    - Homan River
- Tagish Lake
  - Taku Arm
    - Swanson River
    - Fantail River
    - Graham Inlet
    - Racine Creek
    - Tutshi River (from White Pass)
      - East Tutshi River
    - Atlin River
      - Surprise Creek
        - Surprise Lake
      - Torres Channel
      - O'Donnel River
      - Pike River
- Teslin Lake
  - Jennings River
  - Teslin River
    - Kedahda River
  - Hayes River
  - Swift River
  - Gladys River

== See also ==
- List of rivers of Canada
- List of rivers of the Americas
