= Kitlope =

Kitlope is a Tsimshian word meaning "people of the rocks" or "people from the opening in the mountains", a reference to a subgroup of the Haisla peoples. History shows that this village at one time was Kitselas Territory until the Haisla arrived. The Gitlope people forced into Haisla Territory adopted the ways of the Haisla Peoples. The term may refer to:

- the Kitlope group of the Haisla people, who call themselves Henaksiala, and are now part of the Haisla Nation at Kitimaat Village, British Columbia
- Kitlope Anchorage a harbour or anchorage on the North Coast of British Columbia
- Kitlope 16, an Indian Reserve on the North Coast of British Columbia
- Kitlope Lake, a lake in the North Coast region of British Columbia
- Kitlope Range, a subrange of the Kitimat Ranges of the Coast Mountains
- Kitlope River, a river on the North Coast of British Columbia
- the term "the Kitlope" may also refer to the basin of the Kitlope River and its tributaries
- Kitlope Heritage Conservancy, a protected area covering the Kitlope, managed by BC Parks
