= Kitimat River =

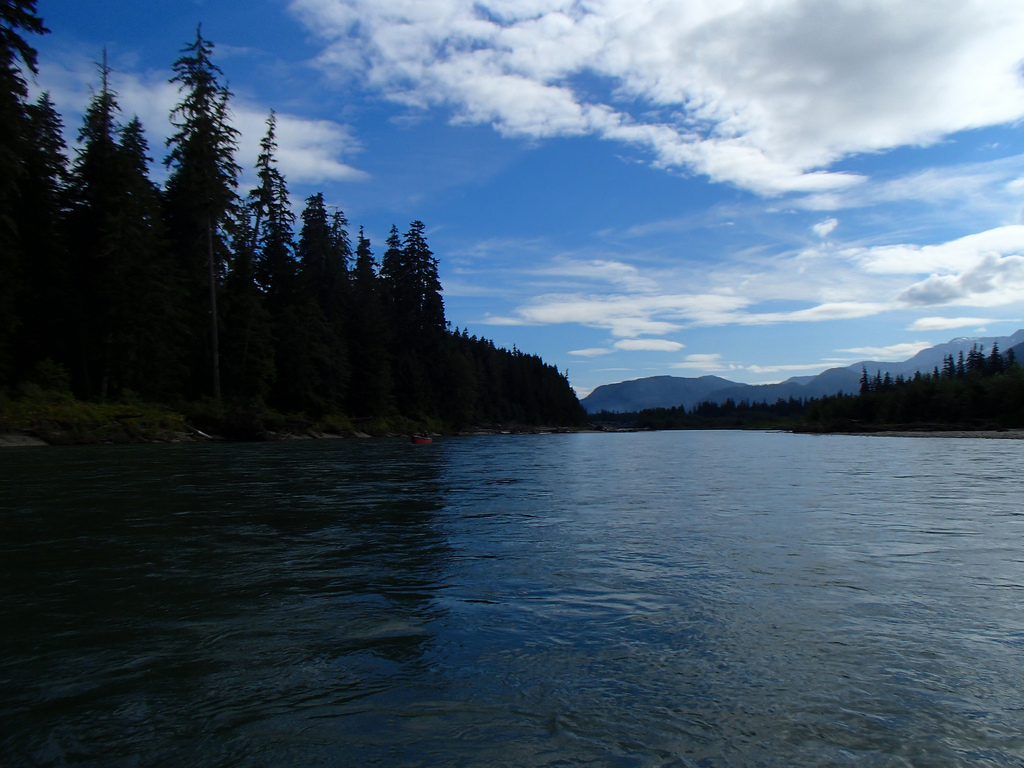
- Kitimat River, August 2012

- Mouth of Kitimat River
- Etymology: Gitamaat First Nation people

Location
- Country: Canada
- Province: British Columbia
- District: Range 5 Coast Land District

Physical characteristics
- Source
  - location: Kitimat Ranges, Coast Mountains
  - coordinates: 53°58′25″N 128°4′18″W
  - elevation: 1,285 m (4,216 ft)
- Mouth: Pacific Ocean
  - location: Kitimat, Douglas Channel
  - coordinates: 54°0′39″N 128°39′44″W
  - elevation: 0 m (0 ft)
- Length: 100 km (62 mi)
- Basin size: 1,990 km^{2} (770 sq mi)
- Discharge
  - location: mouth
  - average: 131 m^{3}/s (4,600 cu ft/s)
  - minimum: 18.2 m^{3}/s (640 cu ft/s)
  - maximum: 3,030 m^{3}/s (107,000 cu ft/s)

Basin features
- Tributaries
  - right: Wedeene River, Little Wedeene River

The Kitimat River is a river in the Canadian province of British Columbia. It originates in the Kitimat Ranges, near the sources of the Dala River, Kemano River, Atna River, and Clore River. It flows in a curve north, then west, then south, emptying into Kitimat Arm at the head of Douglas Channel, at the town of Kitimat.

The river is named after the original First Nations inhabitants of the river valley, the Gitamaat, which means "People of the Falling Snow" in the Tsimshian language. The Gitamaat people themselves are not Tsimshian but Haisla. Today the Haisla Nation is centered on Kitamaat Village, near the mouth of the Kitimat River.

== Course ==
The Kitimat River originates from glacial meltwater on the northern slopes of Atna Peak. The area also feeds the headwaters of the Dala River, Atna River, Clore River, and Kemano River.

The Kitimat River headwaters lie northwest of Atna River Provincial Park.

The Kitimat flows north in a steep valley surrounded by glaciated mountains, such as Mount Davies and Davies Glacier. Davies Creek joins the Kitimat River just north of Mount Davies. Continuing north the Kitimat is joined by Hunter Creek, which collects glacial waters from high mountains such as Andesite Peak and Mount Clore.

After this the Kitimat River turns to flow west, collecting various tributaries such as Tetlock Creek, McKay Creek, and Christ Creek. Christ Creek originates on the north side of Mount Clore.

After the Christ Creek confluence the Kitimat River turns south as it enters the broad Kitimat Valley, which lies between the towns of Kitimat to the south and, Terrace on the Skeena River, to the north. The Stewart-Cassiar Highway, or Highway 37, runs between Terrace and Kitimat, paralleling the Kitimat River after it enters the valley.

As it flows south the Kitimat River is joins by Cecil, Deception, Humphrys, and Nalbeelah Creeks before meeting the Wedeene River, which flows from the northwest. The Wedeene River and its main headwater tributary, Aveling Creek, originate from glaciers on and around Wedeene Mountain, Mount Light, Mount Temple, and Mount Holt.

Nalbeelah Creek Wetlands Provincial Park is located just southeast of the junction of the Kitimat River and Nalbeelah Creek.

Just below the Wedeene River confluence the Kitimat River is joined from the west by the Little Wedeene River. The Little Wedeene River originates at Mount Madden. It drain many other high peaks such as Mount Clague. Just below the Little Wedeene River confluence the Kitimat River flows by Kitimat River Provincial Park.

The Wedeene and Little Wedeene River basins lie just east of Gitnadoiks River Provincial Park.

As the Kitimat River enters the outskirts of the town of Kitimat it is joined by Hirsch Creek, from the east.

Finally the river flows through the town of Kitimat and by Kitimaat Indian Reserve 1, also known as Colichan Ground or Old Town, and is joined by Sumgás Creek, before emptying into Kitimat Arm by Minette Bay, the northernmost part of the long fjord Douglas Channel. The waters of Douglas Channel flow south to Wright Sound and on to Hecate Strait and the Pacific Ocean.

== History ==
Formerly a small fishing village, the present municipal town of Kitimat was built in the 1950s by the Aluminum Company of Canada (Alcan, now Rio Tinto Alcan) to support a large aluminum smelter. To power the smelter Alcan built Kenney Dam on the Nechako River, a 16 km (10 mi) tunnel to the Kemano Generating Station, and 82 km (51 mi) of transmission lines to Kitimat, where a deep sea terminal and smelter were built.

== Tributaries ==
This is an incomplete list of tributaries listed in upstream order.

- Sumgás Creek
- Hirsch Creek
- Little Wedeene River
  - Bowbyes Creek
  - Dahl Creek
  - Lukes Creek
- Wedeene River
  - Iron Mine Creek
  - Raley Creek
  - Lone Wolf Creek
  - Aveling Creek
- Nalbeelah Creek
- Humphrys Creek
- Deception Creek
- Cecil Creek
- Christ Creek
- McKay Creek
  - Bolton Creek
- Tetlock Creek
- Hunter Creek
- Davies Creek
  - Hoult Creek

== See also ==
- List of rivers of British Columbia
