= Cornice Peak =

Cornice Peak may refer to any of three mountain peaks in British Columbia and Alberta:

- Cornice Peak (Canadian Rockies), in the Continental Ranges of the Rocky Mountains in Alberta
- Cornice Peak (Selkirk Mountains), in the Sir Sandford Range of the Selkirk Mountains in British Columbia
- Cornice Peak (Kitimat Ranges), in the Kitimat Ranges of the Coast Mountains in British Columbia

== See also ==
- Cornice Mountain (Stikine Icecap)
- Cornice Mountain (Cambria Icefield)
- Cornice Ridge
- Cornice
