= Kiltuish River =

- Mouth of Kiltuish River

Location
- Country: Canada
- Province: British Columbia

Physical characteristics
- Source: Kitimat Ranges
  - location: Coast Mountains, British Columbia
  - coordinates: 53°14′5″N 128°15′14″W
  - elevation: 910 m (2,990 ft)
- Mouth: Pacific Ocean
  - location: Kiltuish Inlet, British Columbia, Gardner Canal
  - coordinates: 53°19′18″N 128°27′59″W
  - elevation: 0 m (0 ft)
- Length: 25 km (16 mi)

Kiltuish River is a river in the Canadian province of British Columbia. It originates in the Kitimat Ranges, and flows about 25 km (16 mi) north to the Pacific Ocean at Kiltuish Inlet, an arm of the fjord Gardner Canal. The Kiltuish River is within the traditional territory of the Haisla people.

The name "Kiltuish" comes from a Haisla word meaning "long and narrow stretch of water leading outward".

== Course ==
The Kiltuish River originates in the Kitimat Ranges west of the Kowesas River and just north of the source of the Khutze River. It flows generally north and northwest, emptying into Kiltuish Inlet, an arm of Gardner Canal between the Alan and Europa Reaches. The Gardner Canal joins the Pacific Ocean via Devastation Passage, Verney Passage, Douglas Channel, and the complex waterways around Gil Island, Campania Island, and the Estevan Group, which exit into Caamaño Sound and Hecate Strait.

== See also ==
- List of rivers of British Columbia
