= Percy Creek =

Percy Creek may refer to one of the following streams:

Canada

- British Columbia
  - Percy Creek (Indian Arm), in the Lower Mainland
  - Percy Creek (Slocan River), in the West Kootenay Region
- Ontario
  - Percy Creek (Northumberland County), a tributary of the Trent River in Central Ontario
  - Percy Creek (Sudbury District), a tributary of the Batchawana River in Northeastern Ontario
