= Cornice Mountain =

Cornice Mountain may refer to:

- Cornice Mountain (Cambria Icefield)
- Cornice Mountain (Stikine Icecap)
