= Mount Blane (British Columbia) =

Mountain in British Columbia, Canada

- Location within British Columbia
- Location in the Kitlope Heritage Conservancy

Highest point
- Elevation: 1,675 m (5,495 ft)
- Prominence: 310 m (1,020 ft)
- Coordinates: 53°5′46″N 127°41′53″W

Geography
- Location: British Columbia, Canada
- District: Range 4 Coast Land District
- Parent range: Kitlope Range
- Topo map: NTS 93E4 Kitlope Lake

Mount Blane is a mountain in western British Columbia, Canada, located east of Kitlope Lake and southeast of the head of Whidbey Reach. It lies in the Kitlope Range, a subrange of the Kitimat Ranges which in turn form part of the Coast Mountains.
