= Thomas Bayard =

Thomas Bayard may refer to:

- Thomas F. Bayard (1828–1898), politician from U.S. state of Delaware and U.S. Secretary of State
  - Thomas F. Bayard (pilot boat)
- Thomas F. Bayard Jr. (1868–1942), politician from U.S. state of Delaware

== See also ==
- Bayard family
