= Tsaytis River =

River in the state of Utah

Coordinates: 53°14′25″N 127°52′19″W

The Tsaytis River is a river in the Kitimat Ranges of British Columbia, Canada, flowing southwest from its sources in those mountains into the North Coast of that province at the head of the Gardner Canal, adjacent to the mouth of the Kitlope River.

== See also ==
- List of rivers of British Columbia
