= Gain Creek =

River in British Columbia, Canada

- Location of the mouth of Gain Creek Gain Creek (British Columbia)

Location
- Country: Canada
- Province: British Columbia
- District: Capital Regional District

Physical characteristics
- Source: unnamed confluence
  - location: San Juan Ridge
  - coordinates: 48°32′42″N 124°10′14″W
  - elevation: 637 m (2,090 ft)
- Mouth: Loss Creek
  - coordinates: 48°29′47″N 124°12′17″W
  - elevation: 209 m (686 ft)

Gain Creek is a river in the Capital Regional District of British Columbia, Canada. Located on southern Vancouver Island, it flows from its source to its mouth as a right tributary of Loss Creek.

== Course ==
Gain Creek begins at an unnamed confluence on the south slope of the San Juan Ridge at an elevation of 637 metres (2,090 ft). It flows southwest, and reaches its mouth as a right tributary of Loss Creek at an elevation of 209 metres (686 ft), south east of the settlement of Port Renfrew. Loss Creek flows to the Strait of Juan de Fuca on the Pacific Ocean.

== See also ==
- List of rivers of British Columbia
