= Mount Blane =

Mount Blane may refer to:

- Mount Blane (Alberta)
- Mount Blane (British Columbia)
