= Kitimat (disambiguation) =

- Kitimat Ranges - one of the three main subdivisions of the Coast Mountains in British Columbia, Canada
- Kitimat - a district municipality in the North Coast region of British Columbia
- Kitimat River - A river in British Columbia
- Regional District of Kitimat–Stikine - A district in British Columbia
