= Cornice Peak (Kitimat Ranges) =

Mountain in the country of Canada

Coordinates: 52°58′04″N 127°12′44″W

Cornice Peak, 2093 m (6867 feet), is a mountain in the Kitimat Ranges of the Coast Mountains in British Columbia, Canada. It is located on the west side of the Kimsquit River just northwest of the head of Dean Channel. The Kapella River, a tributary of the Kitlope, rises on the west side of Cornice Peak.

== See also ==
- Cornice Peak (disambiguation)
