= Brim River =

River in British Columbia, Canada

Coordinates: 53°30′41″N 128°21′55″W

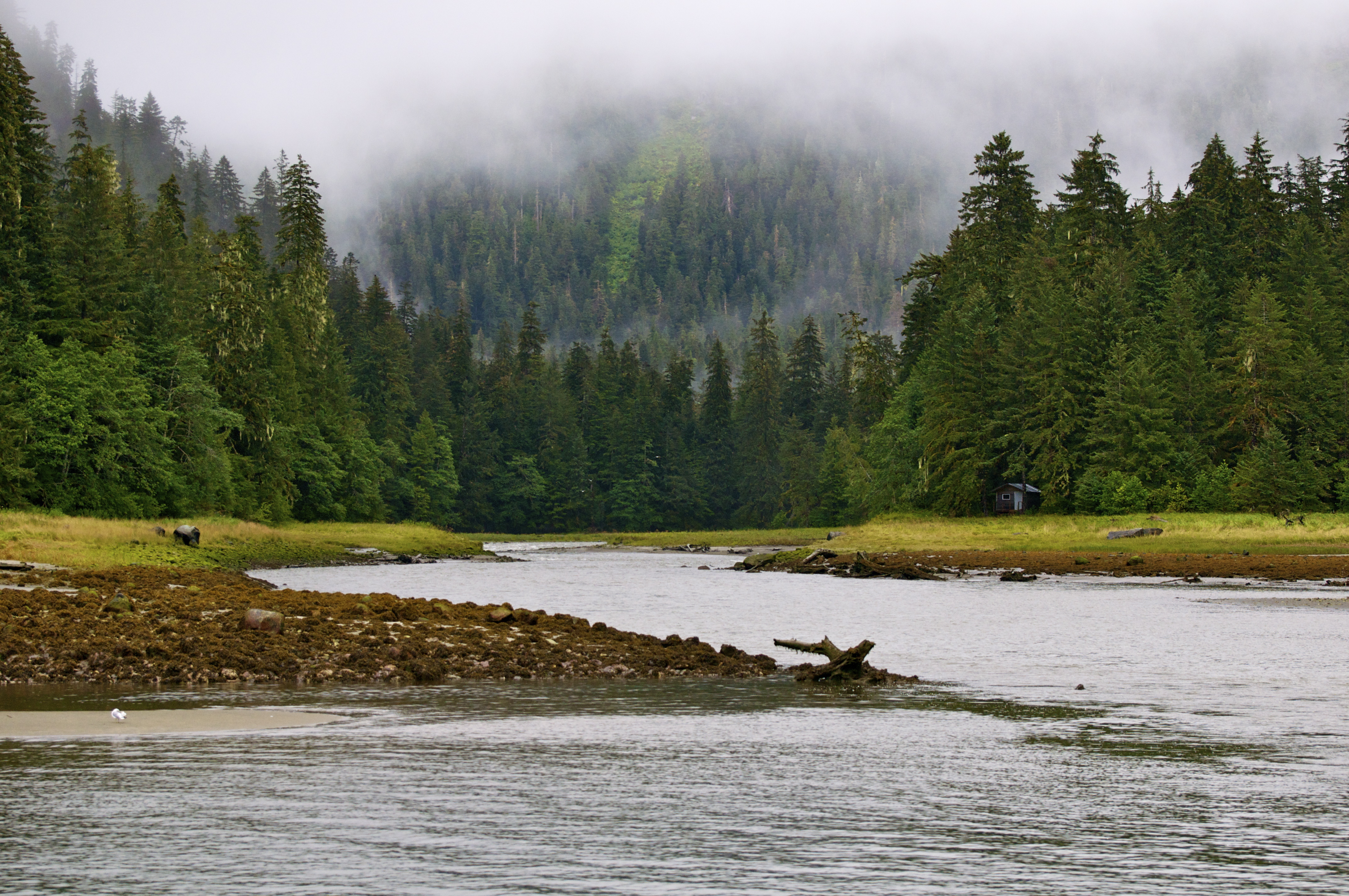
Mouth of the Brim River at the Gardner Canal

The Brim River is a river in the North Coast region of British Columbia, Canada, flowing into Owyacumish Bay which is at the west end of the Barrie Reach of the Gardner Canal.

At the mouth of the Brim River is the Brim River Hot Springs Protected Area, which feature an undeveloped hot spring and pristine old-growth forests. The 202 hectares (500 acres) park is backcountry wilderness and has no visitor facilities.

== Names ==
The name Brim River is thought to have been conferred by Captain Pender of the Royal Navy, though the reason for the name is unknown.

The Haisla language name for the river is Uyagemis ('facing west') ....the Brim and nearby Owyacumish Creek (Anak'edi in Haisla) are in the stewardship area or the holder of the chiefly name Gwenaxnud, head of the Haisla Blackfish clan.

== See also ==
- List of rivers of British Columbia
