= Atna River Provincial Park =

Provincial park in British Columbia, Canada

- IUCN category II (national park)
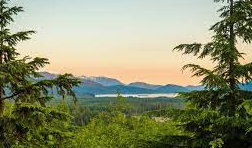

- Location within British Columbia
- Interactive map of Atna River Provincial Park
- Location: British Columbia
- Coordinates: 53°58′29″N 127°54′29″W
- Area: 21,092 ha (81.44 sq mi)
- Established: July 11, 2008
- Website: https://bcparks.ca/atna-river-park

Atna River Provincial Park is a park located in Skeena District, British Columbia, Canada. It is named for the Atna River, which flows through the park. It was first established on July 11, 2008, as a product of the Morice Land and Resource Management Plan. It contains the Morice, Kemano, Dala and Kildala rivers.

== See also ==
- List of protected areas of British Columbia
