= Jack Elliott Creek =

River in British Columbia, Canada

- Location of the mouth of Jack Elliott Creek Jack Elliott Creek (British Columbia)

Location
- Country: Canada
- Province: British Columbia
- District: Renfrew Land District

Physical characteristics
- Source: unnamed slope
  - coordinates: 48°31′35″N 124°13′27″W
  - elevation: 783 m (2,569 ft)
- Mouth: Loss Creek
  - coordinates: 48°29′33″N 124°16′00″W
  - elevation: 117 m (384 ft)

Jack Elliott Creek is a river in the Renfrew Land District of British Columbia, Canada. Located on southern Vancouver Island, it flows from its source to its mouth as a right tributary of Loss Creek.

== Natural history ==
The mouth of the creek, below Highway 14, falls within Juan de Fuca Provincial Park.

== Course ==
Jack Elliott Creek begins at an unnamed slope on the San Juan Ridge at an elevation of 783 metres (2,569 ft). It flows southwest, passes under Highway 14, and reaches its mouth as a right tributary of Loss Creek at an elevation of 117 metres (384 ft), south east of the settlement of Port Renfrew. Loss Creek flows to the Strait of Juan de Fuca on the Pacific Ocean.

== See also ==
- List of rivers of British Columbia
