= Tlell River =

River in the Haida Gwaii Islands in British Columbia

Coordinates: 53°37′07″N 131°55′58″W

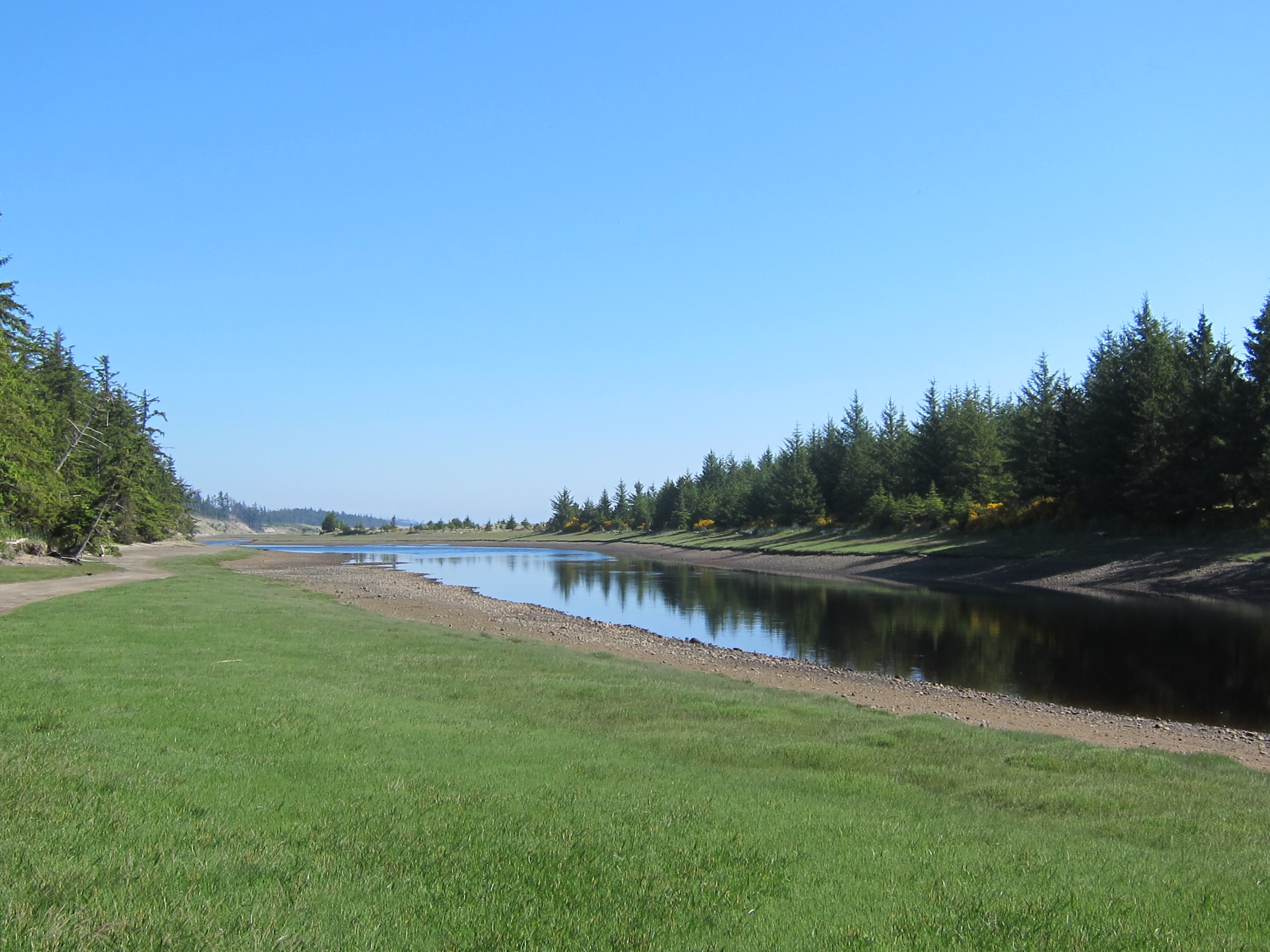
The Tlell near its mouth

The Tlell River is a watercourse on the east side of Graham Island in Haida Gwaii, British Columbia, Canada. It enters Hecate Strait near the community of Tlell. It is the second-longest river in Haida Gwaii, after the Yakoun. Its lower reaches are within Naikoon Provincial Park. The Tlell's headwaters and the swamps of its upper reaches are protected within the Tlall Conservancy. The river is popular with anglers, as it supports large coho salmon.

== See also ==
- List of rivers of British Columbia
