= Kitlope Range =

Mountain range in British Columbia, Canada

Highest point
- Elevation: 772 m (2,533 ft)

Dimensions
- Area: 238 km^{2} (92 mi^{2})

Geography
- Country: Canada
- Province: British Columbia
- Range coordinates: 53°4′30″N 127°41′0″W
- Parent range: Kitimat Ranges

The Kitlope Range is a small subrange of the Kitimat Ranges, located southeast of Kitlope Lake in British Columbia, Canada. It is surrounded by the Tezwa and Kitlope Rivers.

== See also ==
- Kitlope (disambiguation)
