= Rainy River (British Columbia) =

- Mouth of Rainy River

Location
- Country: Canada
- Province: British Columbia

Physical characteristics
- Source: An unnamed lake north of Tetrahedron Peak
  - location: Pacific Ranges
  - coordinates: 49°37′44″N 123°32′42″W
  - elevation: 1,068 m (3,504 ft)
- Mouth: Thornbrough Channel
  - location: Port Mellon
  - coordinates: 49°31′16″N 123°28′48″W
  - elevation: 0 m (0 ft)

The Rainy River is a short river that enters the Thornbrough Channel at Port Mellon, British Columbia, Canada. While it does come close to doing so, it never enters Tetrahedron Provincial Park.

== Course ==
The Rainy River originates in a small unnamed lake just north of Tetrahedron Peak. The river, shortly after exiting the lake, likely drops over a fairly tall waterfall as it drops down a headwall. The river flows southeast for about 3.6 km before turning south and flowing that way for about 9.8 km to its mouth at Port Mellon. The river does not receive any major tributaries.

== See also ==
- List of rivers of British Columbia
