= Cornice Peak (Selkirk Mountains) =

Mountain in the country of Canada

Coordinates: 51°38′57″N 117°46′24″W

Cornice Peak, 2824 m -> 9265 feet, is a mountain in the Sir Sandford Range of the Selkirk Mountains subdivision of the Columbia Mountains in British Columbia, Canada. It is just southwest of Gold Arm of Columbia Reach of Kinbasket Lake.

== See also ==
- Cornice Peak (disambiguation)
