= Necleetsconnay River =

River in the country of Canada

Coordinates: 52°23′21″N 126°46′24″W

The Necleetsconnay River is a river in the Central Coast region of British Columbia, flowing southwest from the southernmost Kitimat Ranges to the head of North Bentinck Arm, adjacent to the mouth of the Bella Coola River and the town of Bella Coola.

The Nuxalk village of Kameik was located on the Necleetsconnay about ¾-mile from the sea. Another village, Tasaltlimk, lay on the shore of North Bentinck Arm west and north of the mouth of the Necleetsconnay.

== See also ==
- List of rivers of British Columbia
