= Rapid River (British Columbia) =

Location
- Country: Canada
- Province: British Columbia
- Region: Stikine
- District: Cassiar Land District

Physical characteristics
- Source: Cry Lake
  - coordinates: 58°49′41″N 128°55′29″W
  - elevation: 1,173 m (3,848 ft)
- Mouth: Dease River
  - coordinates: 59°18′47″N 129°01′34″W
  - elevation: 687 m (2,254 ft)

The Rapid River is a river in Stikine Region, British Columbia, Canada. It begins at Cry Lake at an elevation of 1,173 metres (3,848 ft) at Cry Lake. It travels north to its mouth at the Dease River at an elevation of 687 metres (2,254 ft), 8.7 kilometres (5.4 mi) southeast of British Columbia Highway 37.

== See also ==
- List of rivers of British Columbia
