= McKale River =

Location
- Country: Canada
- Province: British Columbia
- District: Cariboo Land District

Physical characteristics
- Source: Park Ranges
  - location: Rocky Mountains
  - coordinates: 53°28′34″N 119°57′21″W
  - elevation: 1,900 m (6,200 ft)
- Mouth: Fraser River
  - location: Robson Valley
  - coordinates: 53°23′51″N 120°20′32″W
  - elevation: 690 m (2,260 ft)
- Discharge
  - location: gage 08KA009
  - average: 8.25 m^{3}/s (291 cu ft/s)
  - minimum: 0.569 m^{3}/s (20.1 cu ft/s)
  - maximum: 131 m^{3}/s (4,600 cu ft/s)

The McKale River is a tributary of the Fraser River in the Canadian province of British Columbia. The river was named in 1913 by surveyor J.A. Walker, after James McKale, a timber cruiser at McBride

== Course ==
The McKale River originates in the Park Ranges of the Rocky Mountains near Interpass Ridge on the continental divide. It flows generally west to join the Fraser River in the Robson Valley portion of the Rocky Mountain Trench, north of McBride.

== See also ==
- List of rivers of British Columbia
