= Sakumtha River =

River in British Columbia

Coordinates: 52°51′29″N 126°44′41″W

The Sakumtha River is a river in British Columbia, Canada, flowing south out of the Kitimat Ranges from an origin west of the Tsaydaychuz Peak massif into the Dean River north of Bella Coola.

== Name origin ==
"Sakumtha" is from the Kimsquit dialect of the Nuxalk language and means "to wade across".

== See also ==
- List of rivers of British Columbia
