= Mount Clague =

Mountain in British Columbia, Canada

- Location within British Columbia
- Interactive map of Mount Clague

Highest point
- Elevation: 1,349 m (4,426 ft)
- Prominence: 616 m (2,021 ft)
- Parent peak: Mount Madden (1630 m)
- Listing: Mountains of British Columbia
- Coordinates: 54°5′19″N 128°46′31″W

Geography
- Country: Canada
- Province: British Columbia
- District: Range 5 Coast Land District
- Parent range: Kitimat Ranges
- Topo map: NTS 103I2 Kitimat

Mount Clague is a mountain in the Kitimat Ranges of western British Columbia, Canada, located west of the junction of Wedeene River and Kitimat River, just northwest of Kitimat.

The mountain was originally named Mount Claque in 1951 in association with the misspelled name of the triangulation station which had been occupied and named in 1949. The mountain's name was corrected in 1968. Herbert Naden Clague was a BC land surveyor who laid out the subdivision schema of Kitimat in 1910.
