= Thomas F. Bayard (pilot boat) =

Delaware Pilot boat

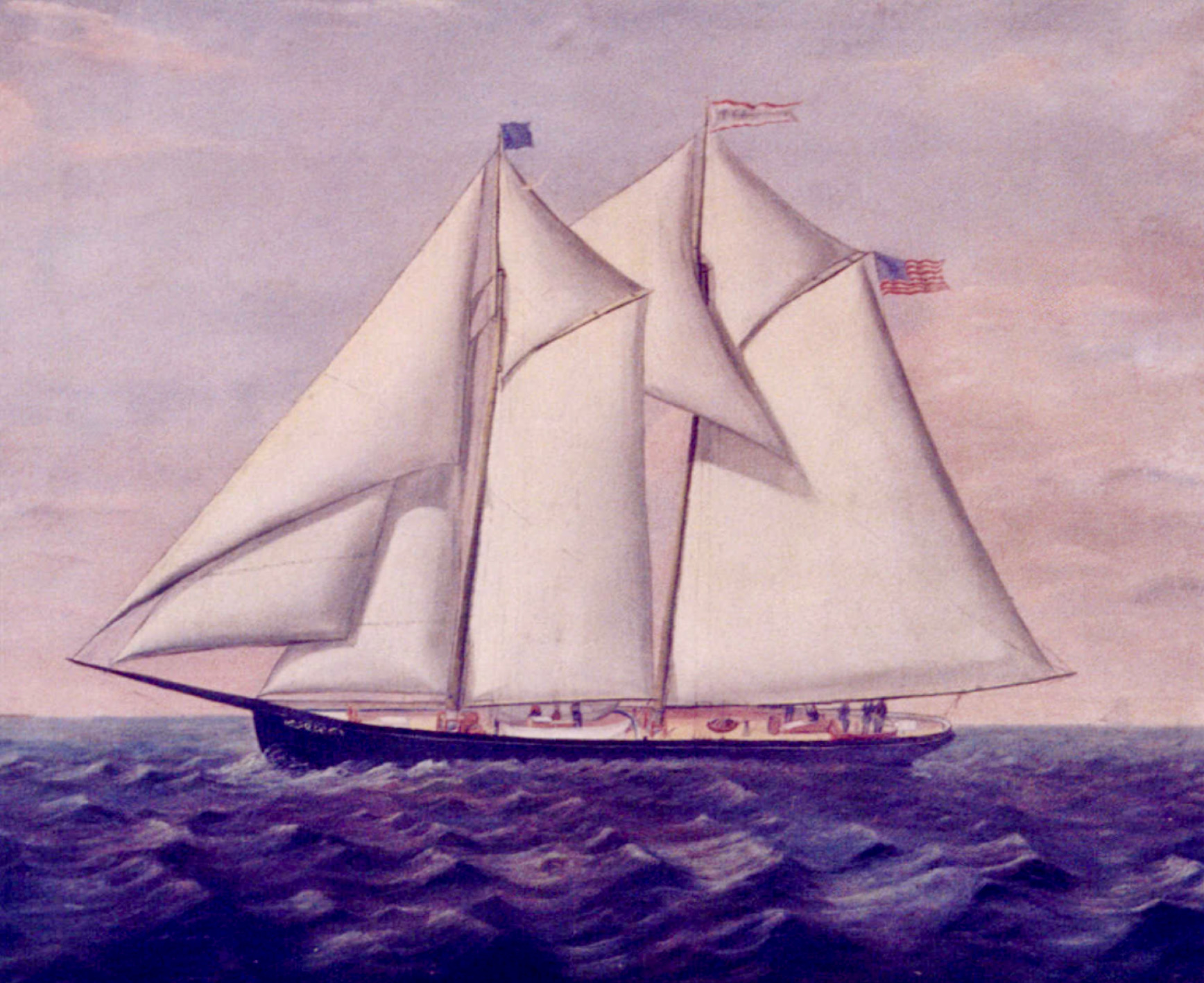
- Pilot boat Thomas F. Bayard.

History

United States
- Name: Thomas F. Bayard
- Namesake: Thomas F. Bayard, United States Senator
- Owner: Delaware Pilots, Henry Virden
- Builder: C. & R. Poillon
- Cost: $15,000
- Launched: March 13, 1880
- Out of service: July 15, 1897
- Renamed: Sandsheads
- Fate: Sold

General characteristics
- Class & type: schooner
- Tonnage: 70-tons TM
- Length: 94 ft 0 in (28.65 m)
- Beam: 21 ft 4 in (6.50 m)
- Depth: 13 ft 0 in (3.96 m)
- Propulsion: Sail
- Sail plan: 98 ft 0 in (29.87 m) Mainmast; 95 ft 0 in (28.96 m) Foremast
- Notes: Wood-hulled, copper sheathed, two-masted schooner

The Thomas F. Bayard was a 19th-century Delaware River pilot schooner built by C. & R. Poillon shipyard in 1880. She spent sixteen years as a pilot boat before being sold during the Yukon Gold Rush in 1897. She was sold again in 1906 for Seal hunting, then purchased by the Department of Marine & Fisheries where she guided freighters into New Westminster, British Columbia for 43 years. She was then acquired by the Vancouver Maritime Museum in 1978. When she sank at her mooring in 2002, the International Yacht Restoration School, Mystic Seaport and the Vancouver Maritime Museum, removed the vessel in pieces for the archeological teams to study and document the remains of her hull. The Thomas F. Bayard Collection, at the Vancouver Maritime Museum, contains the documents, history and preservation efforts.

== Construction and service ==
Thomas F. Bayard was a pilot schooner built in 1880, by ship designer William Townsend, superintendent of the C. & R. Poillon shipyard in Brooklyn, New York. Townsend previously, designed the yacht Sappho, which won the America's Cup in 1871. The Bayard, Sappho and America were based on the same design and were of similar size. She was launched on March 13, 1880, and built for Captain Henry Virden, of Philadelphia at a cost of $15,000. She was named in honor of Thomas F. Bayard, an early Delaware politician and United States Senator from Wilmington, Delaware. The sail number "2" was painted in black on her mainsail to distinguish her from other pilot-boats.

For the first sixteen years, the Thomas F. Bayard, No. 2, was used as Delaware pilot boat that helped transport maritime pilots between inbound or outbound ships coming into the Port of Philadelphia. She was one of the last schooners in the Delaware Bay service.

The Thomas F. Bayard was registered as a pilot Schooner with the Record of American and Foreign Shipping from 1881 to 1900. Her ship owners were Philadelphia Pilots; built in 1880 at Brooklyn, Long Island; and her hailing port was the Port of Philadelphia. Her dimensions were 94 ft. in length; 21.4 ft. breadth of beam; 13 ft. depth of hold; and 70-tons Tonnage. The sail number "2" was painted in black on her mainsail to distinguish her from other pilot-boats.

== End of service ==
Steam power rendered the Thomas F. Bayard obsolete. As a result, on July 15, 1897, she was purchased by the Alaska Transport, Trading and Mining Company, who used her to transport miners and freight for the Yukon Gold Rush. She sailed out to the Pacific Northwest around the Cape Horn and traded as far north as St. Michael's at the mouth of the Yukon River, Alaska and as far south as Seattle and Port Townsend, Washington. In 1906, when the Gold Rush ended, she was sold to Captain Hans Blakstad, who used her as a sealer for seal and sea otter fishing out of Victoria, British Columbia. In 1911, she was purchased by the Canadian Department of Marine & Fisheries for use as a lightship. She worked with the fleet of vessels at the mouth of the Fraser River in British Columbia, Canada. She was renamed, the Sandsheads No. 16, and guided freighters into New Westminster, British Columbia for 43 years until 1956. In 1969 she became a houseboat in Mosquito Creek in North Vancouver.

The Bayard was then acquired by the Vancouver Maritime Museum in 1978 for $8,500. More than $100,000 was spent on her restoration. She was towed to Sterling Shipyards where she was rebuilt from 1979 to 1980. During this time the Bayard was recognized by the British Columbia Historical Trust as a Heritage Vessel. The Vancouver Maritime Museum received a $50,000.00 grant from the British Columbia Heritage Trust that was used in her restoration. In December 1983, the Thomas F. Bayard Restoration Society was formed by a local group, headed by president Doug Ford. The goal of the committee was to restore the vessel as a "sealer" vessel and allow the public to view her while moored at the museum's harbor. In 1990 the Thomas F. Bayard Restoration Society took the lead in trying to raise more money to restore the vessel.

The Bayard was then exhibited at the Vancouver Museum where she was visited by thousands of people. In December 1996, the Bayard suffered a setback when over three feet of snow covered her and caused her to sink at her mooring. In September 2002, the century-old pilot boat was found grounded in low tide near False Creek. The city hauled the sunken boat out of the creek in pieces for the U.S. based International Yacht Restoration School, Mystic Seaport and the Vancouver Maritime Museum, for the archeological teams to study and document the remains of her hull. The Thomas F. Bayard collection, at the Vancouver Maritime Museum, includes photographs, textual records and negatives related to the history and preservation efforts.

== See also ==
- Delaware Pilot boats
- Pilots' Association For The Bay & River Delaware
