= Sombrio River (Canada) =

- Location of the mouth of the Sombrio River Sombrio River (Canada) (British Columbia)

Location
- Country: Canada
- Province: British Columbia
- Regional District: Capital Regional District
- Land District: Renfrew Land District

Physical characteristics
- Source: unnamed confluence
  - coordinates: 48°32′28″N 124°15′05″W
  - elevation: 530 m (1,740 ft)
- Mouth: Strait of Juan de Fuca
  - coordinates: 48°30′01″N 124°18′05″W
  - elevation: 0 m (0 ft)

The Sombrio River is a river in the Capital Regional District of British Columbia, Canada. Located on southern Vancouver Island, it flows to the Strait of Juan de Fuca on the Pacific Ocean at Sombrio Beach.

== Natural history ==
The lower reaches of the river, below British Columbia Highway 14, fall within Juan de Fuca Provincial Park.

== Course ==
The Sombrio River begins at an unnamed confluence at an elevation of 507 metres (1,663 ft). It flows southwest, passes under British Columbia Highway 14, flows under a suspension bridge carrying the Juan de Fuca Marine Trail, and ends at the Strait of Juan de Fuca on the Pacific Ocean at Sombrio Beach, north of Sombrio Point and south east of the settlement of Port Renfrew.

== See also ==
- List of rivers of British Columbia
