= Kapella River =

River in the state of Utah

Coordinates: 53°03′18″N 127°30′21″W

The Kapella River is a river in the Kitimat Ranges of the Coast Mountains in British Columbia, Canada. It rises west of Cornice Peak and flows northwest to join the Kitlope River.

== See also ==
- Capella (disambiguation)
- List of rivers of British Columbia
