= Noyse Creek =

River in British Columbia, Canada

- Location of the mouth of Noyse Creek Noyse Creek (British Columbia)

Location
- Country: Canada
- Province: British Columbia
- Regional District: Capital Regional District
- Land District: Renfrew Land District

Physical characteristics
- Source: unnamed confluence
  - location: San Juan Ridge
  - coordinates: 48°32′44″N 124°11′50″W
  - elevation: 782 m (2,566 ft)
- Mouth: Loss Creek
  - coordinates: 48°29′47″N 124°14′10″W
  - elevation: 150 m (490 ft)

Noyse Creek is a river in the Capital Regional District of British Columbia, Canada. Located on southern Vancouver Island, it flows from its source to its mouth as a right tributary of Loss Creek. The upper reaches of the creek were originally logged in 1967-1975 and replanted. The surrounding forest is now a prime example of a 50-year old second growth eco-system.

== Course ==
Noyse Creek begins at an unnamed confluence on the south slope of the San Juan Ridge at an elevation of 782 metres (2,566 ft). It flows southwest, and reaches its mouth as a right tributary of Loss Creek at an elevation of 150 metres (490 ft), south east of the settlement of Port Renfrew. Loss Creek flows to the Strait of Juan de Fuca on the Pacific Ocean.

== See also ==
- List of rivers of British Columbia
