= Kedahda River =

- Location in Canada

Location
- Country: Canada
- Provins: British Columbia
- District: Cassiar Land District

Kedahda River is a river located in the province of British Columbia, Canada. The area around Kedahda River consists mainly of pine forests, and is virtually uninhabited, with less than two inhabitants per square kilometre. The annual average temperature is -3 °C. The warmest month is July, when the average temperature is 11 °C, and the coldest is January, when the average temperature is -17 °C.

== See also ==
- List of rivers of British Columbia
