= O'Donnel River =

Coordinates: 59.3557°N 133.5665°W

O'Donnel River is a river located in the Atlin Country region of British Columbia. This river flows into the east side of Atlin Lake about 23 kilometres (14 mi) south of the town of Atlin. The river is about 48 kilometres (30 mi) long. The river was first recorded in 1898, and was originally known as Moose River or Caribou River. In 1912, a rich gold streak was discovered in the river, which attracted many miners. The river has been sluiced, drifted, and hydraulicked.

== See also ==
- List of rivers of British Columbia
