= Tenaiko Range =

Mountain range in British Columbia, Canada

Coordinates: 53°15′15″N 127°31′00″W

Highest point
- Elevation: 1,042 m (3,419 ft)

Dimensions
- Area: 185 km^{2} (71 mi^{2})

Geography
- Country: Canada
- Province: British Columbia
- Parent range: Kitimat Ranges

The Tenaiko Range is a small subrange of the Kitimat Ranges in British Columbia, Canada. It is surrounded by the Gamsby River and Tenaiko Creek. It reaches a height of 1,042 meters above sea level.
