= Brittain River =

- Mouth of Brittain River
- Etymology: Rowland Brittain
- Native name: slhílhem (Sechelt)

Location
- Country: Canada
- Province: British Columbia
- District: New Westminster Land District

Physical characteristics
- Source: Pacific Ranges
  - location: Coast Mountains, British Columbia
  - coordinates: 50°7′29″N 124°7′26″W
  - elevation: 1,157 m (3,796 ft)
- Mouth: Pacific Ocean
  - location: Jervis Inlet, British Columbia, Salish Sea
  - coordinates: 49°59′50″N 124°0′34″W
  - elevation: 0 m (0 ft)
- Length: 23 km (14 mi)

The Brittain River is a river of the Sunshine Coast of the Canadian province of British Columbia. It originates in the Pacific Ranges of the Coast Mountains, and flows about 23 km (14 mi) southeast to the Pacific Ocean at the Princess Royal Reach of Jervis Inlet.

Brittain River is within the swiya (world, "Territory") of the shíshálh people. Its shíshálh name is slhilhem. The shíshálh consider the entire slhilhem watershed to be of extremely high cultural and spiritual value. It is home to numerous cultural resources and ceremonial, spiritual, legendary, and oral history sites. In addition, the river valley was a traditional travel route to Powell River.

The river is named for Rowland Brittain, British Columbia's first patent attorney and owned land at the river's mouth in 1901–1902.

== Course ==
Brittain River originates at Arctic Lake in the Pacific Ranges. It flows east through Doris Lake then turns south. It flows through a forested, mountainous, glaciated U-shaped valley to Jervis Inlet. Its mouth is about 40 km (25 mi) northeast of the city of Powell River. About 5 km (3.1 mi) upstream from its mouth a waterfall, approximately 10–15 metres (33–49 ft) 10–15 m high, blocks fish migration.

== Natural history ==
Historically, Brittain River supported anadromous salmon and trout in its lower 5 km (3.1 mi), and non-anadromous trout and char in its upper reaches. Anadromous fish populations include coho, Chinook, chum, and pink salmon, as well as steelhead and cutthroat trout. Non-anadromous fish include cutthroat and Dolly Varden. The river's watershed has a long history of heavy logging with associated wildfires, along with mineral exploration. This has significantly altered the aquatic habitats of the lower Brittain River.

The shíshálh consider the river a good candidate for fishery and wildlife rehabilitation.

== See also ==
- List of rivers of British Columbia
