= Milk River (British Columbia) =

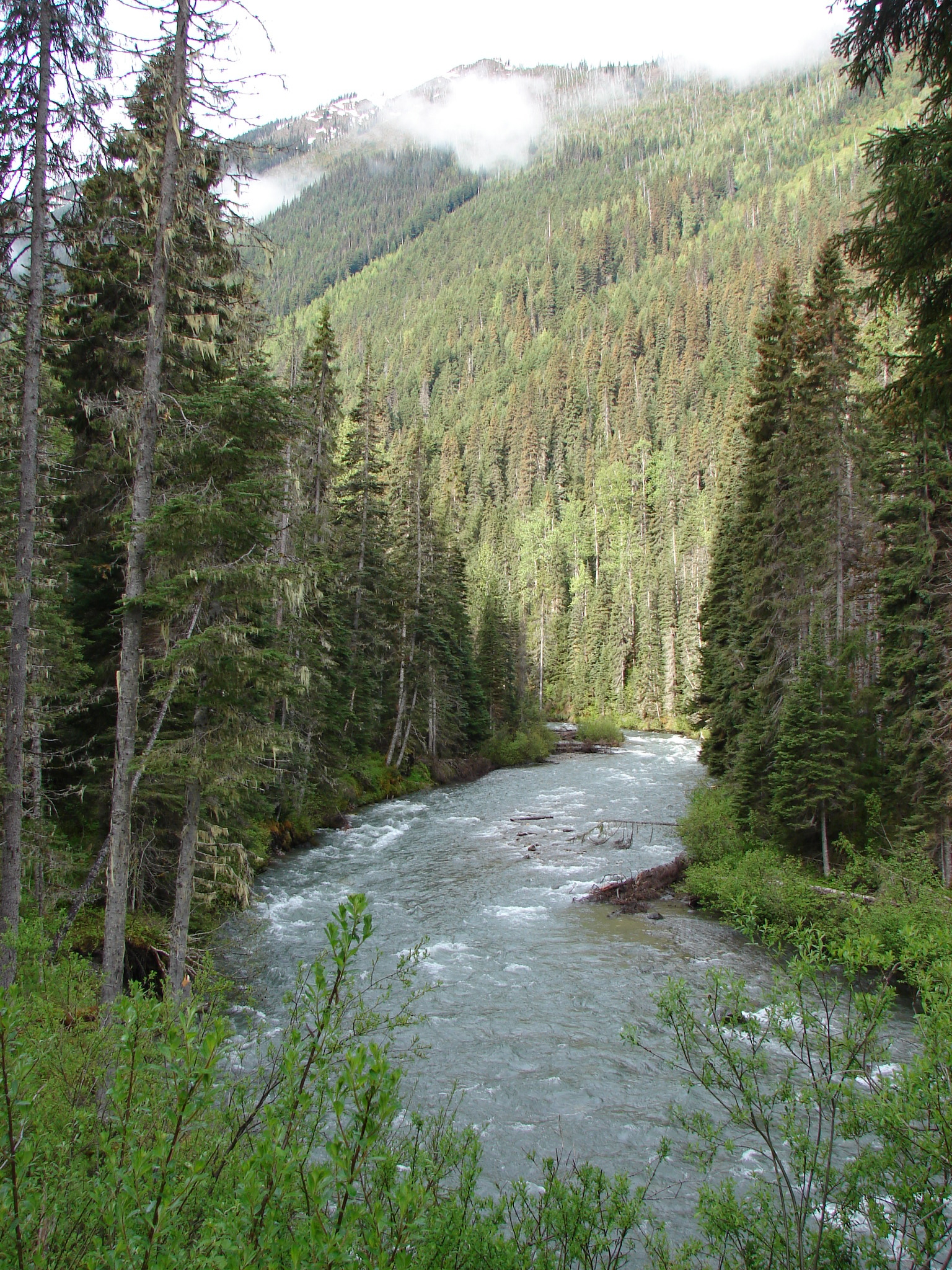

Location
- Country: Canada
- Province: British Columbia
- District: Cariboo Land District

Physical characteristics
- Mouth: Goat River
  - coordinates: 53°25′29″N 120°42′38″W

The Milk River is a tributary of the Goat River, which is a tributary of the Fraser River, in the Canadian province of British Columbia.

== See also ==
- List of rivers of British Columbia
