= Loss Creek (British Columbia) =

River in British Columbia, Canada

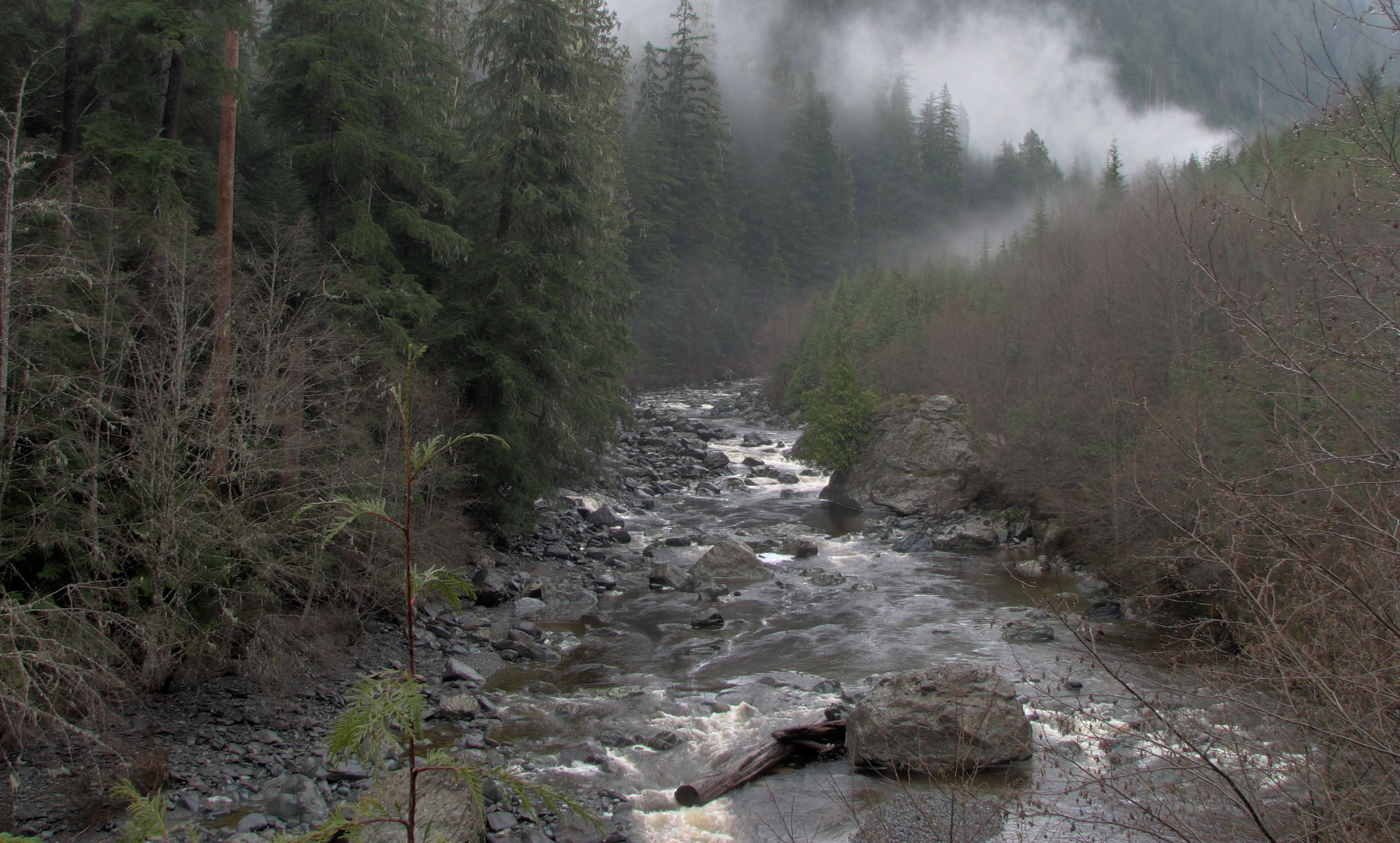
- Loss Creek, at the mouth of the tributary Noyse Creek

- Location of the mouth of Loss Creek Loss Creek (British Columbia) (Vancouver Island) Loss Creek (British Columbia) (British Columbia)

Location
- Country: Canada
- Province: British Columbia
- District: Capital Regional District

Physical characteristics
- Source: unnamed confluence
  - coordinates: 48°29′47″N 124°06′04″W
  - elevation: 507 m (1,663 ft)
- Mouth: Strait of Juan de Fuca
  - coordinates: 48°28′50″N 124°16′23″W
  - elevation: 0 m (0 ft)
- Length: 16 km (9.9 mi)

Basin features
- Tributaries
  - right: Jack Elliott Creek; Noyse Creek; Gain Creek

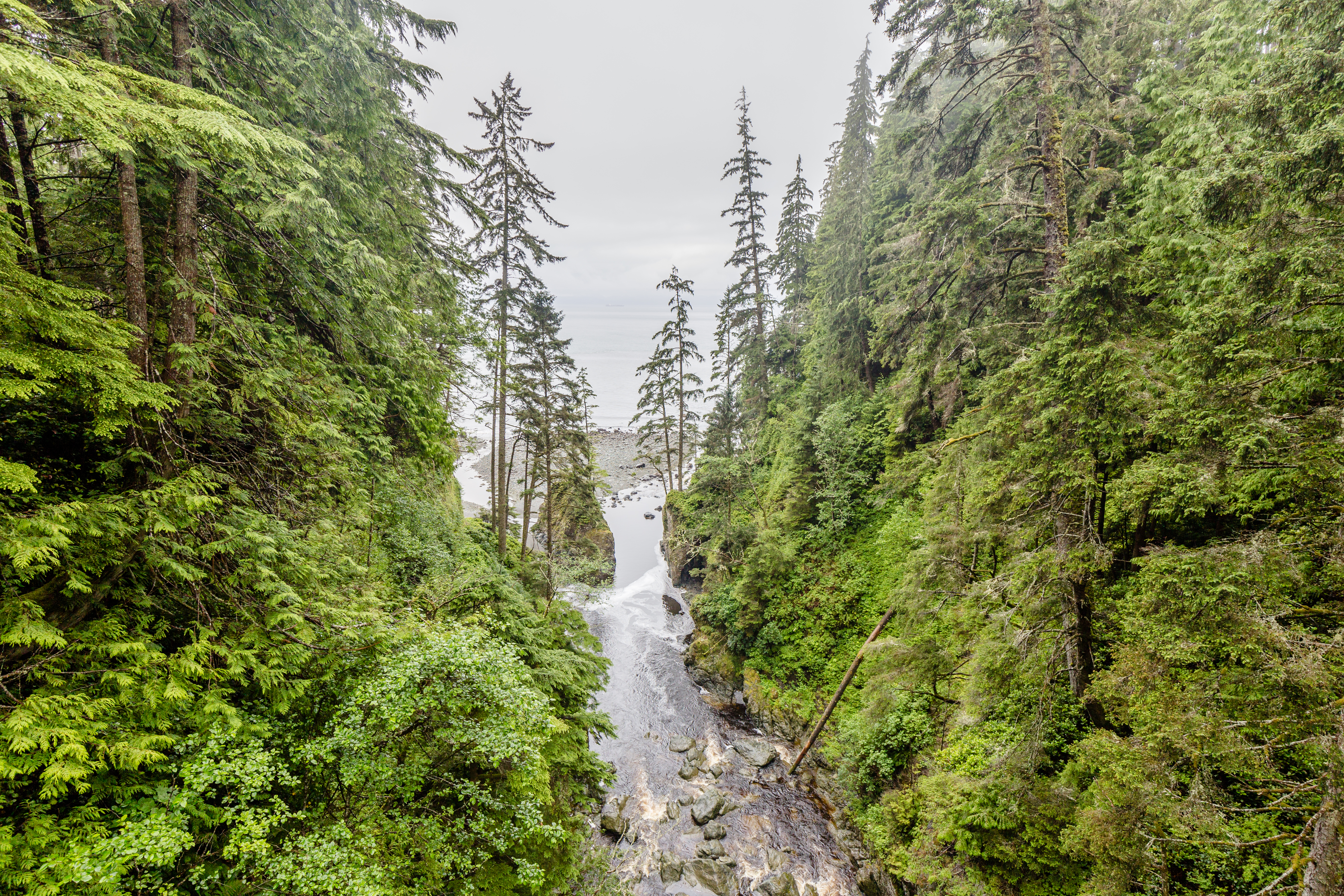
Loss Creek flowing to the ocean

Loss Creek is a river in the Capital Regional District of British Columbia, Canada. Located on southern Vancouver Island, it flows through a long, steep-sided valley to the Strait of Juan de Fuca on the Pacific Ocean.

== Geology ==
The stream mostly follows an unusually long, straight, narrow, and steep-sided valley, between the Jordan Ridge to the south and the San Juan Ridge to the north. This valley is the surface trace of the Leech River Fault, a major regional fault that marks the contact between the oceanic basalts of the Crescent Terrane (part of Siletzia) to the south, and the metamorphic rocks of the Pacific Rim Terrane to the north. The Leech River fault is straight because it was originally a strike-slip fault (moving horizontally), but now it is being thrust under Vancouver Island. As the Pacific Rim rock is uplifted and exposed it rapidly erodes; this releases the occasional gold deposit, which then collects in placer deposits in Loss Creek.

== Natural history ==
The lower reaches of the stream fall within the Juan de Fuca Provincial Park.

== Course ==
Loss Creek begins at an unnamed confluence at a point north of the settlement of Jordan River at an elevation of 507 metres (1,663 ft). It flows west for 14 kilometres (8.7 mi), taking in the right tributaries Gain Creek and Noyse Creek, passing under Highway 14, and taking in the right tributary Jack Elliott Creek. It then turns south for 2 kilometres (1.2 mi), flows under a suspension bridge carrying the Juan de Fuca Marine Trail, and ends at the Strait of Juan de Fuca on the Pacific Ocean, east of Sombrio Point and south east of the settlement of Port Renfrew. The average slope is 3.2% over 16 km (507m/16000m=0.03169). Rapids of 12% slope exist near the mouth of the tributary Gain Creek. The steeper the slope the higher the uplift versus erosion. This indicates an anomaly of uplift compared to the rest of the valley.

== Tributaries ==
All three are right tributaries and are listed in upstream order:

- Jack Elliott Creek
- Noyse Creek
- Gain Creek

== See also ==
- List of rivers of British Columbia
