= Windsor River =

- Mouth of Windsor River

Location
- Country: Canada
- Province: British Columbia
- District: Range 5 Coast Land District

Physical characteristics
- Source: Kitimat Ranges
  - location: Coast Mountains
  - coordinates: 54°7′1″N 129°49′21″W
  - elevation: 666 m (2,185 ft)
- Mouth: Skeena River
  - coordinates: 54°12′55″N 129°50′28″W
  - elevation: 29 m (95 ft)
- Length: 14 km (8.7 mi)

The Windsor River is a tributary of the Skeena River located in the Skeena-Queen Charlotte Regional District, British Columbia, in the southwestern part of Canada.

The river flows north about 14 km (8.7 mi) through mainly coniferous forest. The river's drainage basin is virtually uninhabited, with less than 2 inhabitants per square kilometre. Inland climate is prevailing in the area. The local average annual temperature is 0 °C. The warmest month is August, when the average temperature is 11 °C and the coldest is December, with -8 °C.

== See also ==
- List of rivers of British Columbia
- List of ships in British Columbia
