= Kitlope Indian Reserve No. 16 =

Coordinates: 53°15′00″N 127°53′00″W

Kitlope 16, properly the Kitlope Indian Reserve No. 16, is an Indian reserve on the North Coast of British Columbia, to the south of Kitimat, British Columbia and at the mouth of the Kitlope River, which flows north into the head of the Gardner Canal to the south of that town. It is the home reserve of the Henaksiala or Kitlope or Gitlope group of the Haisla, who are now part of the Haisla Nation government and settled with the Haisla at Kitamaat Village, the reserve community near Kitimat.
