= Cornice Peak (Canadian Rockies) =

Mountain in Alberta, Canada

Coordinates: 52°12′04″N 116°51′24″W

Cornice Peak, 3188 m (10459 feet), is a mountain in the Continental Ranges of the Canadian Rockies in Alberta, Canada.

== See also ==
- Cornice Peak (disambiguation)
