= Khutze River =

River in British Columbia

- Mouth of the Khutze River

Location
- Country: Canada
- Province: British Columbia
- District: Range 3 Coast Land District

Physical characteristics
- Source: Kitimat Ranges
  - location: Coast Mountains
  - coordinates: 53°13′25″N 128°13′49″W
  - elevation: 1,520 m (4,990 ft)
- Mouth: Khutze Inlet
  - location: Princess Royal Channel
  - coordinates: 53°5′19″N 128°25′26″W
  - elevation: 0 m (0 ft)
- Length: 38 km (24 mi)
- Basin size: 274 km^{2} (106 sq mi),
- Discharge
  - average: 51.6 m^{3}/s (1,820 cu ft/s)

Basin features
- Tributaries
  - left: East Khutze River
- Topo map: NTS103H1 Khutze River

The Khutze River is a river in the northern coast part of the province of British Columbia, Canada.

From its source in the Kitimat Ranges of the Coast Mountains the Khutze River flows west and south for about 38 km (24 mi) to empty into Khutze Inlet and Princess Royal Channel, east of Princess Royal Island.

The Khutze River's drainage basin covers 274 km^{2} (106 sq mi). The river's mean annual discharge is estimated at 51.6 m^{3}/s (1,820 cu ft/s), with most of the flow occurring between May and November. The Khutze River's watershed's land cover is classified as 35.1% snow/glacier, 32.7 conifer forest, 20.0% barren, 9.9% shrubland, and small amounts of other cover. The mouth of the Khutze River is located about 105 km (65 mi) south of Kitimat, 185 km (115 mi) southeast of Prince Rupert, about 350 km (220 mi) northwest of Vancouver, and about 385 km (239 mi) west of Prince George.

The entire Khutze River watershed is within the K’ootz/Khutze Conservancy.

The Khutze River lies within the asserted territory of the Gitga'at First Nation and the Kitasoo/Xaixais First Nation, which manages the K'ootz/Khutze Conservancy in partnership with BC Parks.

== Geography ==
From its source north of Marmor Peak in the Kitimat Range, the Khutze River flows first west, then south, then west again to Khutze Inlet. Its main tributary is the East Khutze River. Khutze Inlet joins the Graham Reach of Princess Royal Channel, a narrow waterway that separates Princess Royal Island from the mainland and is part of the Inside Passage.

== History ==
The K’ootz/Khutze Conservancy was created in 2006. Within it are two mineral claims dating to the 1920s. Both yielded copper, silver, and gold. Neither are operation today, but some remnants of rail grades used to transport ore are still visible in the Khutze River estuary.

== Wildlife ==
The Khutze River watershed provides habitat for a wide variety of wildlife including grizzly bears, wolves, deer, eagles, waterfowl, and salmon. The adjacent waters of Khutze Inlet and Princess Royal Channel support wildlife including humpback whales, orcas, Dall's porpoises, Pacific white-sided dolphins, sea lions, and harbour seals.

== See also ==
- List of rivers of British Columbia
