= Kitlope Heritage Conservancy =

Provincial park in Kitimat-Stikine Regional District, British Columbia

- Huchsduwachsdu Nuyem Jees
- IUCN category Ib (wilderness area)
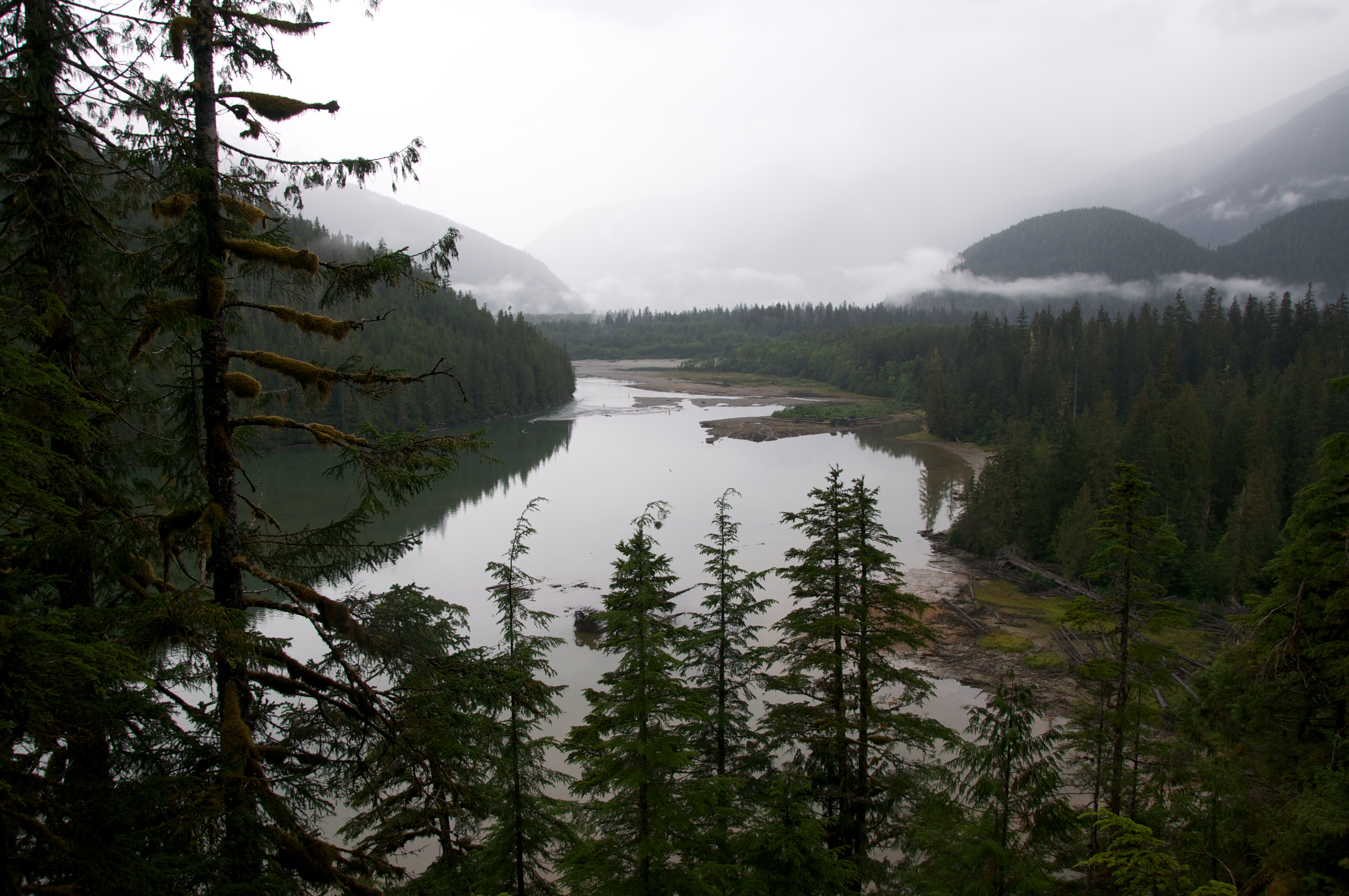
- Kitlope Lake, near the centre of the conservancy

- Location within British Columbia
- Location: Kitimat-Stikine, British Columbia
- Nearest city: Bella Coola
- Coordinates: 53°05′13″N 127°44′49″W
- Area: 322,020 ha (795,700 acres)
- Designation: Conservancy
- Established: February 20, 1996

The Kitlope Heritage Conservancy or Huchsduwachsdu Nuyem Jees ("source of milky blue waters") in the Haisla language, is a conservancy located on the Pacific coast of the province of British Columbia, Canada. It preserves the largest continuous tract of coastal temperate rainforest in the world. Beginning at the head of Gardner Canal, the park stretches inland along the Kitlope River to the border of Tweedsmuir Provincial Park.

== History ==
The Kitlope River area is within the ancestral homeland of the Haisla people. The Haisla used the area for hunting and fishing, especially the production of oolichan grease, for which the tribe was famous along the Pacific coast. By the early 1990s, the West Fraser Timber logging company had acquired logging leases for large tracts of forest in the drainage. The Haisla, along with Portland, Oregon-based advocacy group Ecotrust, lobbied the company and the provincial government to place a moratorium on logging in the watershed.

In 1994, West Fraser agreed to relinquish its lease without compensation. In consultation with the Haisla Nation, the provincial government established a Protected Area around the Kitlope on February 20, 1996. In 2008, it was renamed a Conservancy, reflecting the co-management of the park by BC Parks and the Haisla. Conservancies in the park system are a lower level of protection than full Provincial Parks, allowing "low-impact" economic activities such as eco-tourism, but prohibiting heavy industries such as logging, mining, power generation and road construction.

The push for a park in the Kitlope valley was part of a larger effort to protect more of the coastal temperate rainforest in B.C., an ecological zone that has been heavily logged in the south of the province. The Kitlope region is considered part of the Great Bear Rainforest (GBR), a term coined by environmental groups. The Conservancy was the first major portion of the GBR to receive protection.

In Stories from the Magic Canoe of Wa'xaid, Cecil Paul tells the story of how the Kitlope was preserved. "...in our language we call it ‘Huchsduwachsdu Nuyem Jees.’ That means the land of milky blue waters and the sacred stories contained in this place. You think it's a victory because we saved the land. But what we really saved is our heritage, our stories, which are embedded in this place and which couldn't survive without it, and which contain all our wisdom for living."

== Geography ==
The Conservancy covers 322,020 hectares (795,700 acres) of coastal temperate rainforest, making it the largest such preserve in the world. It lies at the head of the Whidbey Reach of the Gardner Canal, and encompasses the drainages of the Kitlope, Kalitan, Gamsby, Tsaytis, Kapella, and Tezwa rivers. During the spring melt, these rivers are subject to heavy flooding and carry large amounts of debris. Much of the park is mountainous; south of the Kitlope River the granite domes and ridges are part of the Kitlope Range, a sub-range of the Kitimat Ranges. In the north, they form part of the Tochquonyalla Range, a sub-range of the Tahtsa Ranges. Icefields and glaciers occupy the higher elevations.

The valley floors of the park are narrow, most being between one and two kilometres wide. Many, such as the Gamsby valley, are covered by braided channels of gravel deposited by the rivers. The park has one major lake, Kitlope, which is fed by the Tezwa River and enters the Kitlope River near its estuary.

The park is part of a large continuous area of protected wilderness. Tweedsmuir Provincial Park, which abuts Kitlope in the northeast, is the largest protected area in the province. The Fiordland Conservancy protects over 80,000 hectares of coastal fjords on the KHC's western boundary. Together the major parks and several smaller reserves represent over 2.3 million hectares of undeveloped land in a variety of ecological zones.
