= Percy Creek (Indian Arm) =

- Location of the mouth of Percy Creek in British Columbia

Location
- Country: Canada
- Province: British Columbia
- Region: Lower Mainland
- District Municipality: North Vancouver

Physical characteristics
- Source: Unnamed slope
  - coordinates: 49°22′11″N 122°56′36″W
  - elevation: 993 m (3,258 ft)
- Mouth: Indian Arm
  - coordinates: 49°21′14″N 122°54′27″W
  - elevation: 0 m (0 ft)

Basin features
- River system: Pacific Ocean

Percy Creek is a stream in the southeastern part of the District of North Vancouver in the Lower Mainland part of British Columbia, Canada. It is in the Pacific Ocean drainage basin and is a right tributary of Indian Arm.

== Course ==
Percy Creek begins at unnamed slope in Mount Seymour Provincial Park at a height of just under 1,000 metres (3,300 ft). It heads east and empties into the west end of Goldie Lake, accessible via the park's Goldie Lake Loop Trail. It exits the lake at the east in a southeast direction, exits the park, and reaches its mouth at sea level on the west side of Indian Arm, between the settlements of Alder Creek and Cascade. Indian Arm connects via Burrard Inlet and the Salish Sea to the Pacific Ocean.

== See also ==
- List of rivers of British Columbia
