= Percy Creek (Slocan River tributary) =

- Location of the mouth of Percy Creek in British Columbia

Location
- Country: Canada
- Province: British Columbia
- Region: Kootenays
- Regional District: Central Kootenay

Physical characteristics
- Source: Unnamed slope
  - coordinates: 49°38′27″N 117°34′39″W
  - elevation: 1,270 m (4,170 ft)
- Mouth: Slocan River
  - coordinates: 49°38′08″N 117°32′42″W
  - elevation: 515 m (1,690 ft)

Basin features
- River system: Columbia River drainage basin

Percy Creek is a stream in the Regional District of Central Kootenay in the Kootenays Region of British Columbia, Canada. It is part of the Columbia River drainage basin, and is a right tributary of the Slocan River and is thus in the Slocan Valley.

== Course ==
Percy Creek begins at unnamed slope and flows east to its mouth at the Slocan River at the community of Appledale. The Slocan River flows via the Kootenay River to the Columbia River.

== See also ==
- List of rivers of British Columbia
