= Goat River (Fraser River tributary) =

Tributary of the Fraser River in British Columbia, Canada

Coordinates: 53°31′57″N 120°33′34″W

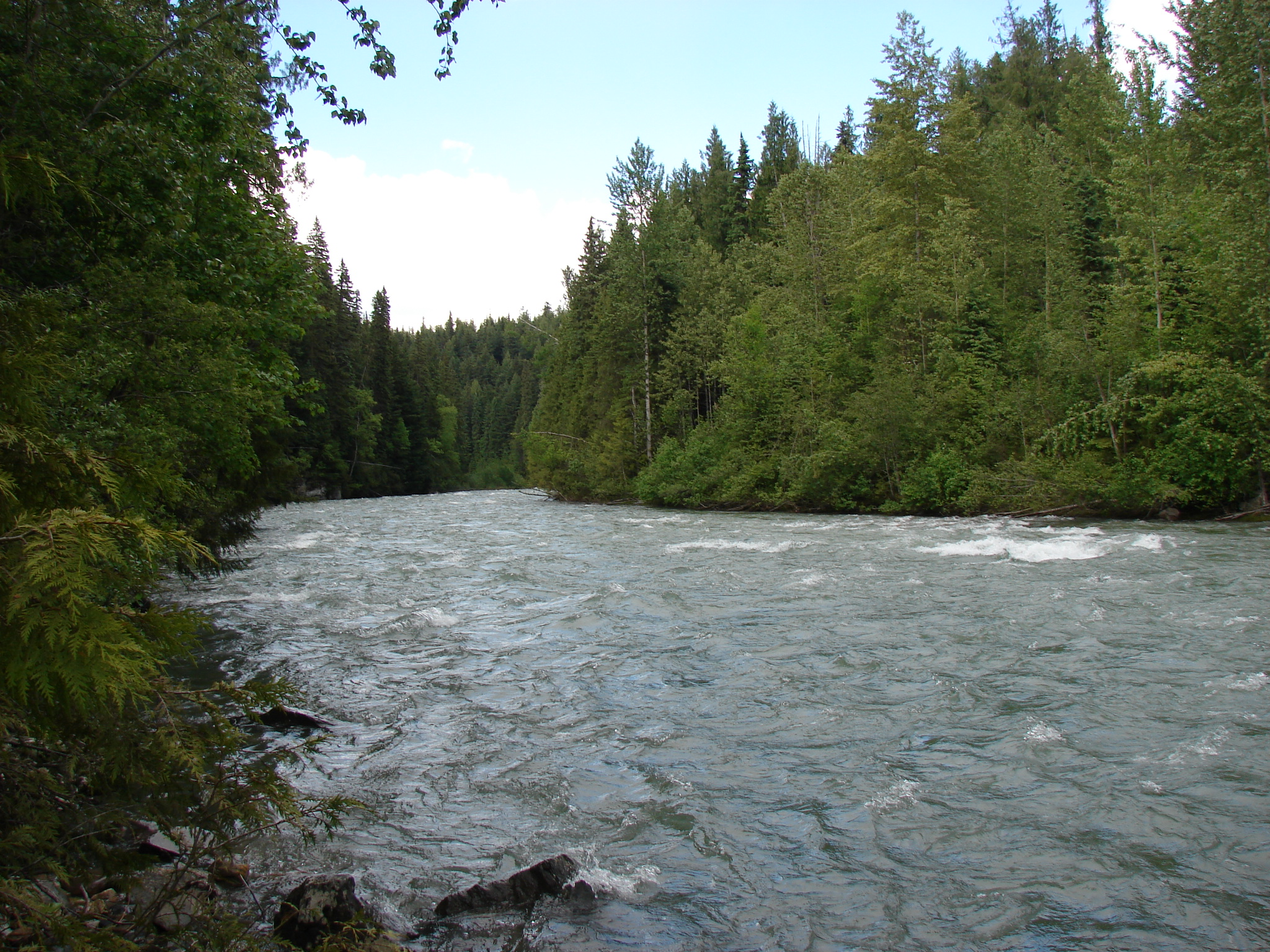
The Goat River near Highway 16

The Goat River is a tributary of the Fraser River in British Columbia, Canada. Starting in the northern reaches of the Cariboo Mountains, it flows eastward and northeastward to join the Fraser near the settlement of Crescent Spur in the Robson Valley. Including its main tributary, the Milk River, its watershed covers 66,468 hectares (164,250 acres). Other major tributaries for the river include McLeod, North Star, Whitehorse, Quartz, Diggings and Kendall creeks.

== History ==
The river valley was an important travel route between the Robson Valley and the forested plateaus of the Bowron Lakes region for First Nations people. After the Cariboo Gold Rush began, a pack trail along the old route was opened to connect the goldfields with the Fraser. It was surveyed by Robert Buchanan, who gave the river its current name. Later, the trail was used to supply illicit liquor to the dry camps constructing the Grand Trunk Pacific Railway through the Robson Valley. After the construction of the rail line, the route fell into disuse.

The area was mostly unvisited until the 1980s, when logging activities commenced in the river valley. A road was constructed up the lower river into the Milk River valley. In 1998 the Fraser Headwaters Alliance, an environmental advocacy group based in Dunster began opposition to the expansion of logging in the watershed. The FHA constructed a major hiking trail through the drainage in order to promote the natural beauty of the area. Between 1998 and 2000 a new bridge and road into the upper river valley was constructed by a logging company, McBride Forest Industries, based in nearby McBride. Timber licenses in the upper drainage were approved by the provincial government. In the early 2000s resistance by local groups and the high costs of accessing the upper river forced MFI to abandon its logging plans.

== Ecology ==
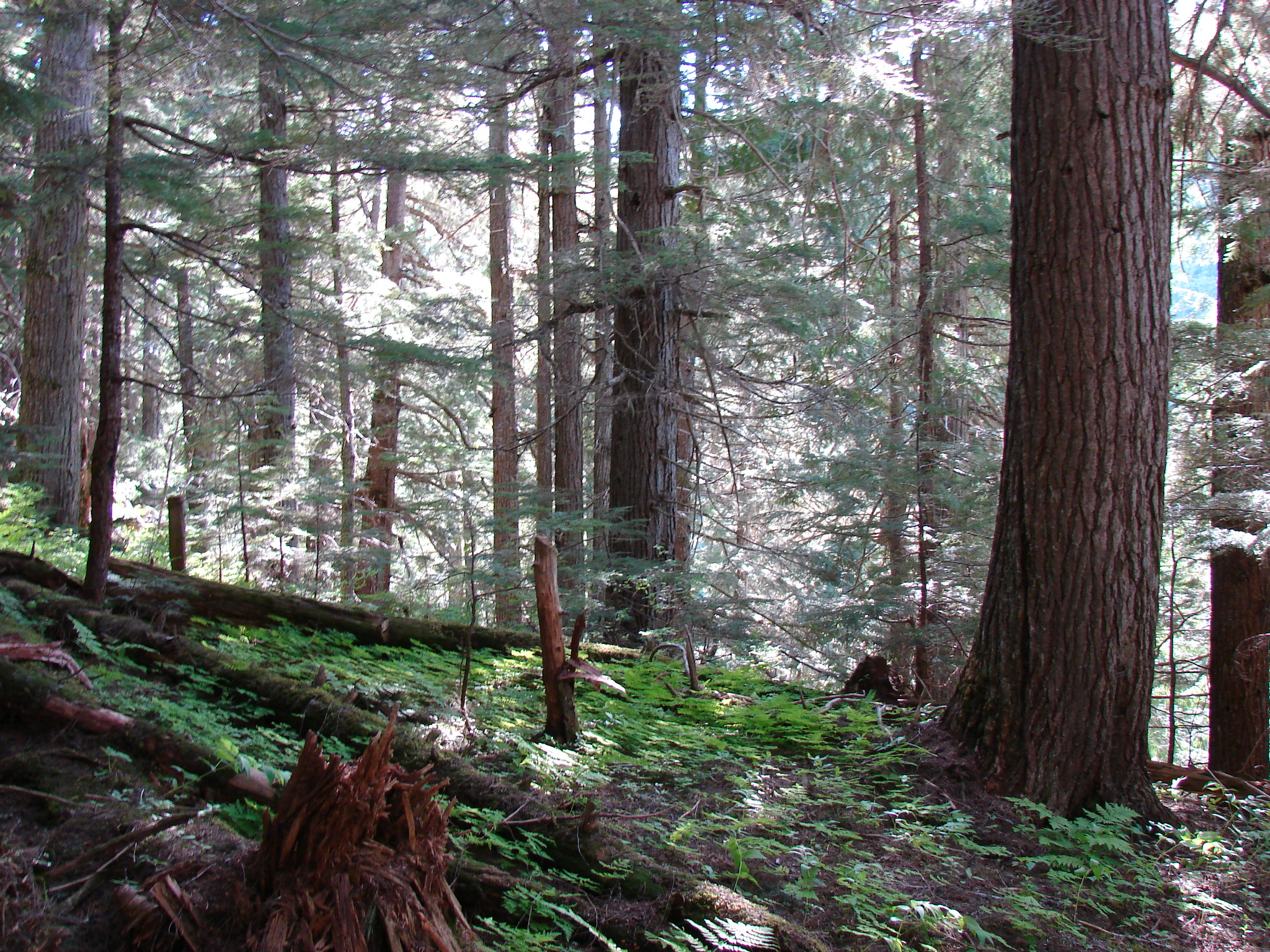
Old growth Interior Cedar-Hemlock forest in the Goat River valley

The river has clear and relatively cold waters, reaching a maximum yearly temperature of about 8 °C (46 °F). It supports populations of bull trout and chinook salmon, both of which use the river's gravel beds as spawning sites. It also supports mountain whitefish. The Milk River is glacially fed and contributes amounts of rock flour and sediment to the lower Goat. However, above its confluence with the Milk, the upper Goat River is not glacially fed and has exceptionally clear waters.

The Goat watershed contains habitat for several large mammal species, including grizzly bears, mountain goats, wolverines and wolves. Caribou migrate through the area, and can be found in high concentrations in several of the tributary drainages, notably McLeod Creek.

The Goat River and adjacent valleys are covered by predominantly coniferous forests, falling into four of British Columbia's biogeoclimatic zones. In the lower river valley, the wet interior cedar-hemlock zone dominates, with old-growth stands of large western red cedar present. The Engellmann spruce-subalpine fir zone covers much of the rest of the drainage. Deciduous stands are present along the river's edge. The dominant ground cover in the valley is devil's club.

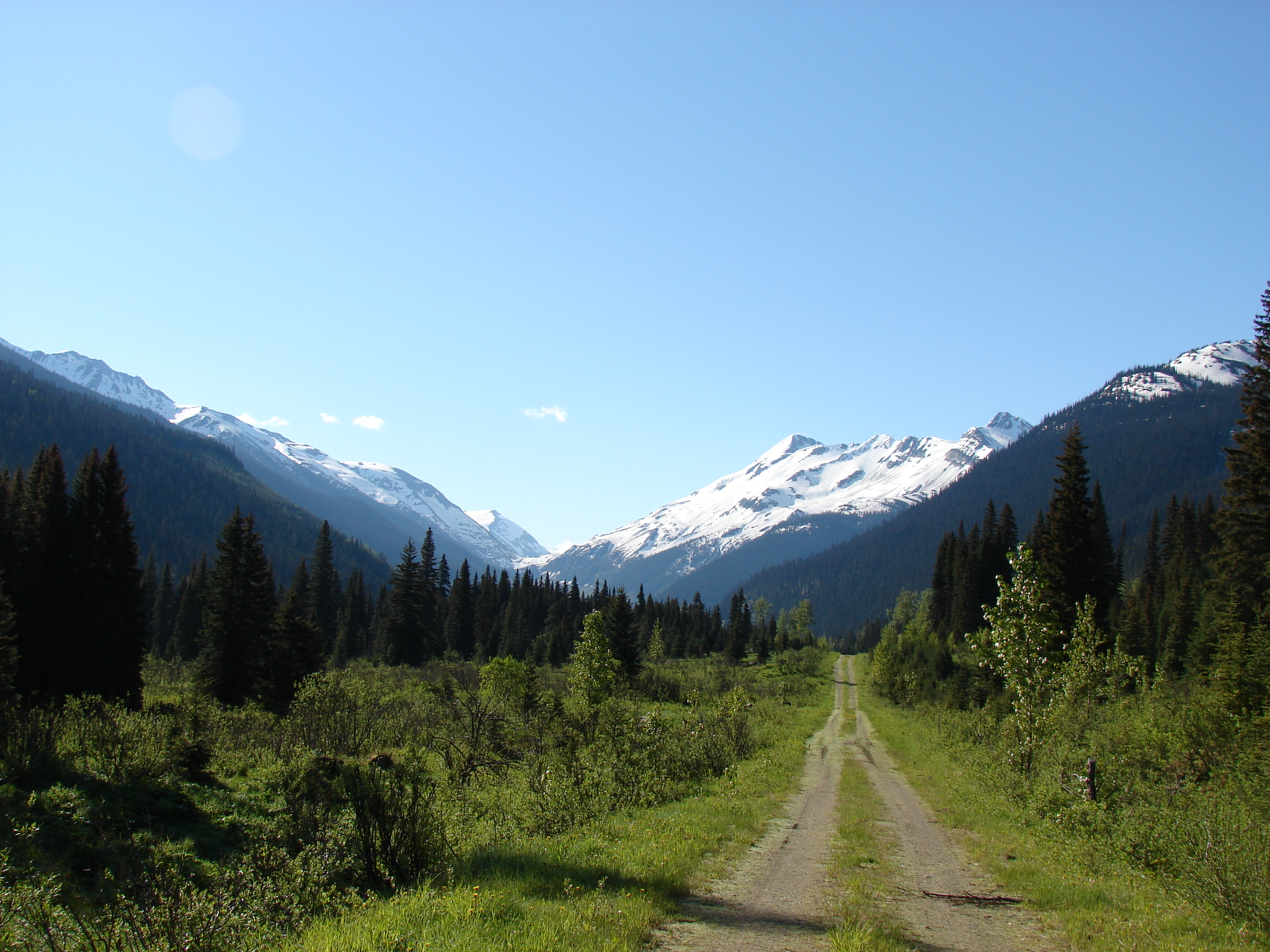
View from the Goat – Milk River Forest Service Road towards the pass at the headwaters of the Milk River in the Cariboo Mountains

The lower Goat and Milk River watersheds have seen some disturbance through human activities, mostly mining and logging. A logging road follows the lower river then continues into the Milk drainage. The upper river, however, is almost completely undisturbed and contains the second largest tract of unprotected old-growth forest in the Robson Valley region, after the Raush River watershed to the south.

== Recreation ==
The historical route between Barkerville and the Fraser along the Goat valley was restored by the Fraser Headwater Alliance as a recreational hiking trail in 1998. 91 kilometres (57 mi) of trail were opened up between the Robson Valley and the Bowron Lakes. This trail is part of a national trail network; it joins with the Alexander MacKenzie Heritage Trail and the Gold Rush Pack Trail. The Goat River portion includes several stream fordings and a cable car over the Milk River. The river is also used by kayakers. Heli-skiing operations take place on the high slopes above the upper river.

== See also ==
- List of tributaries of the Fraser River
