= Nalbeelah Creek Wetlands Provincial Park =

Provincial park in British Columbia, Canada

- IUCN category II (national park)
- Location within British Columbia
- Interactive map of Nalbeelah Creek Wetlands Provincial Park
- Location: British Columbia, Canada
- Nearest city: Kitimat
- Coordinates: 54°08′39″N 128°34′35″W
- Area: 1.71 km^{2} (0.66 sq mi)
- Established: May 17, 2004
- Governing body: BC Parks

Nalbeelah Creek Wetlands Provincial Park is a provincial park in British Columbia, Canada.
