= Kitlope River =

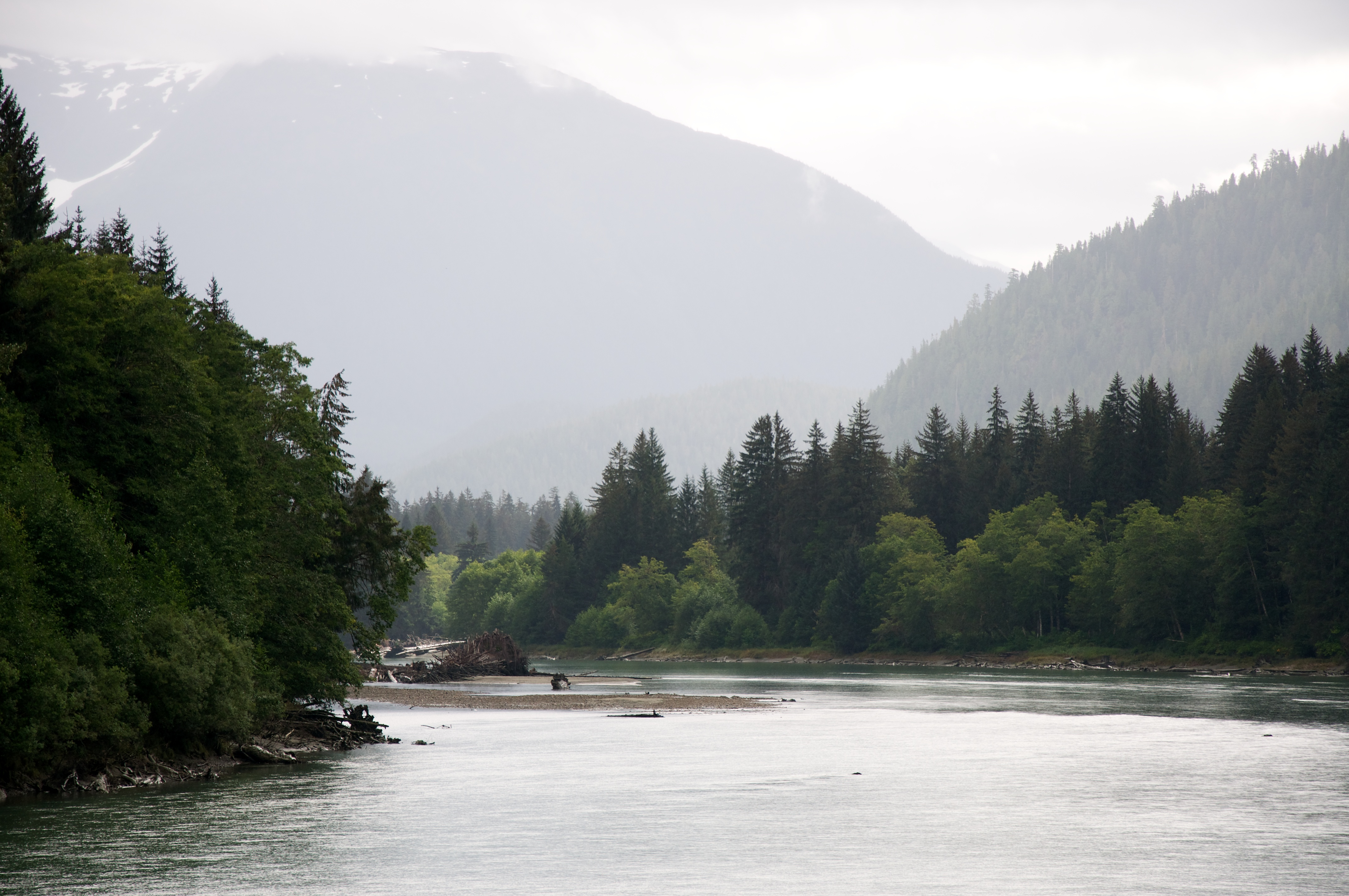
- The Kitlope River

- Mouth of Kitlope River

Location
- Country: Canada
- Province: British Columbia
- District: Coast Land District

Physical characteristics
- Source: Kitimat Ranges
  - location: Coast Mountains
  - coordinates: 52°43′32″N 127°34′34″W
  - elevation: 693 m (2,274 ft)
- Mouth: Gardner Canal
  - coordinates: 53°15′1″N 127°53′35″W
  - elevation: 40 m (130 ft)
- Length: 100 km (62 mi)

The Kitlope River is a river in the Kitimat Ranges in the North Coast of British Columbia, Canada, flowing north for 100 km (62 mi), into the head of the Gardner Canal to the south of the smelter town of Kitimat. It is named for the Gitlope group of Haisla, now part of the Haisla Nation government and community at Kitamaat Village near Kitimat. The name is a Tsimshian language reference to the people, who call themselves Henaksiala, and means "people of the rocks" or "people of the opening in the mountains". The Haisla language name for the river is Xesduwaxwsdu.

The term "the Kitlope" may refer also to the basin of the Kitlope, including the basins of its tributaries. The area has been the scene of protracted conservationist vs. resource extraction controversy since the 1970s and is now the Kitlope Heritage Conservancy, a protected area managed by BC Parks.

The Kitlope Indian Reserve No. 16 is located at the river's mouth.

== Tributaries ==
- Tsaytis River (C'itis in Haisla) - joins the Kitlope at its estuary
- Kalitan Creek (Tlasudis in Haisla) - joins the Kitlope via the Tezwa
- Tezwa River (Wa'yuwa in Haisla) - joins the Kitlope via Kitlope Lake
- Gamsby River
- Tnaiko Creek (Daniko in Haisla; the Tenaiko is a tributary to the Gamsby - note also Tenaiko Range)
- Kapella River (Qapela'ax in Haisla)

== See also ==
- Khutzeymateen Grizzly Bear Sanctuary
- Great Bear Rainforest
- Kitlope (disambiguation)
- List of rivers of British Columbia
