= Tezwa River =

River in the state of Utah

Coordinates: 53°04′11″N 127°48′38″W

The Tezwa River is a river in the Kitimat Ranges of the Coast Mountains in British Columbia, Canada. It is part of the Kitlope River drainage, feeding that river via the head of Kitlope Lake.

== Name ==
The name was created by Frank Swannell, government surveyor, in 1921, suggesting that as a form easier to pronounce for Europeans than the Haisla name told him by a native he met along the Kitlope River, Hwuis-u-tezwa. On a map of the same year he used Hwuis-y-yez-wa River.

== See also ==
- List of rivers of British Columbia
