= One Eye Lake =

Lake in British Columbia, Canada

- Location within British Columbia
- Location: British Columbia
- Coordinates: 51°58′N 124°54′W
- Primary inflows: Klinaklini River
- Primary outflows: Klinaklini River
- Basin countries: Canada
- Max. length: 4.5 km (2.8 mi)
- Max. width: 1.5 km (0.93 mi)
- Surface area: 7.0661 km^{2} (2.7282 sq mi)
- Average depth: 6.1 m (20 ft)
- Max. depth: 9.8 m (32 ft)
- Water volume: 0.0431 cubic kilometres (0.0103 mi^{3})
- Shore length^{1}: 17.5 km (10.9 mi)
- Surface elevation: 915 m (3,002 ft)
- Islands: 2
- Settlements: Kleena Kleene, British Columbia
- ^{1} Shore length is not a well-defined measure.

One-Eye Lake is a freshwater lake in the West Chilcotin area of British Columbia, Canada, situated just east of the community of Kleena Kleene, British Columbia. This pristine lake is a popular lake for fishing, and is serviced by a BC Forest Service campsite on the south side.

The only river flowing into and out of the lake is the Klinaklini River. Just after exiting the lake to the west, it joins up with the McClinchy River.

The lake is named after Chief One-Eye who got his name on account of having only one eye. One-Eye was buried on the north side of the lake in 1911.

== See also ==
- List of lakes of British Columbia
