= Gamsby River =

River in British Columbia

Coordinates: 53°06′08″N 127°34′08″W

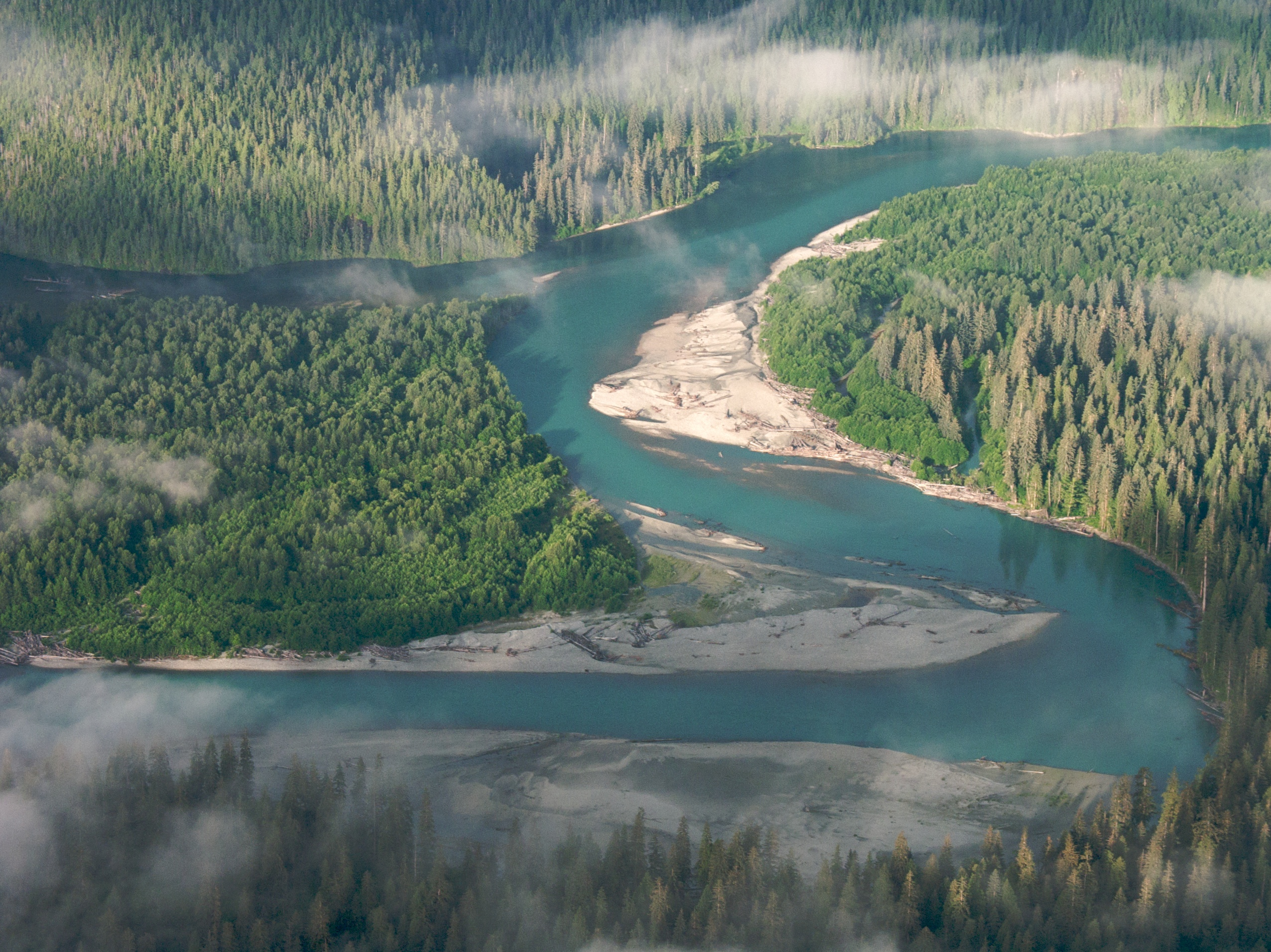
Confluence of the Gambsy and Kitlope rivers

The Gamsby River is a river in the Kitimat Ranges of the North Coast region of British Columbia, Canada. It flows southwest to meet the Kitlope River, of which it is a tributary.

== See also ==
- List of rivers of British Columbia
