= Princess Royal Channel =

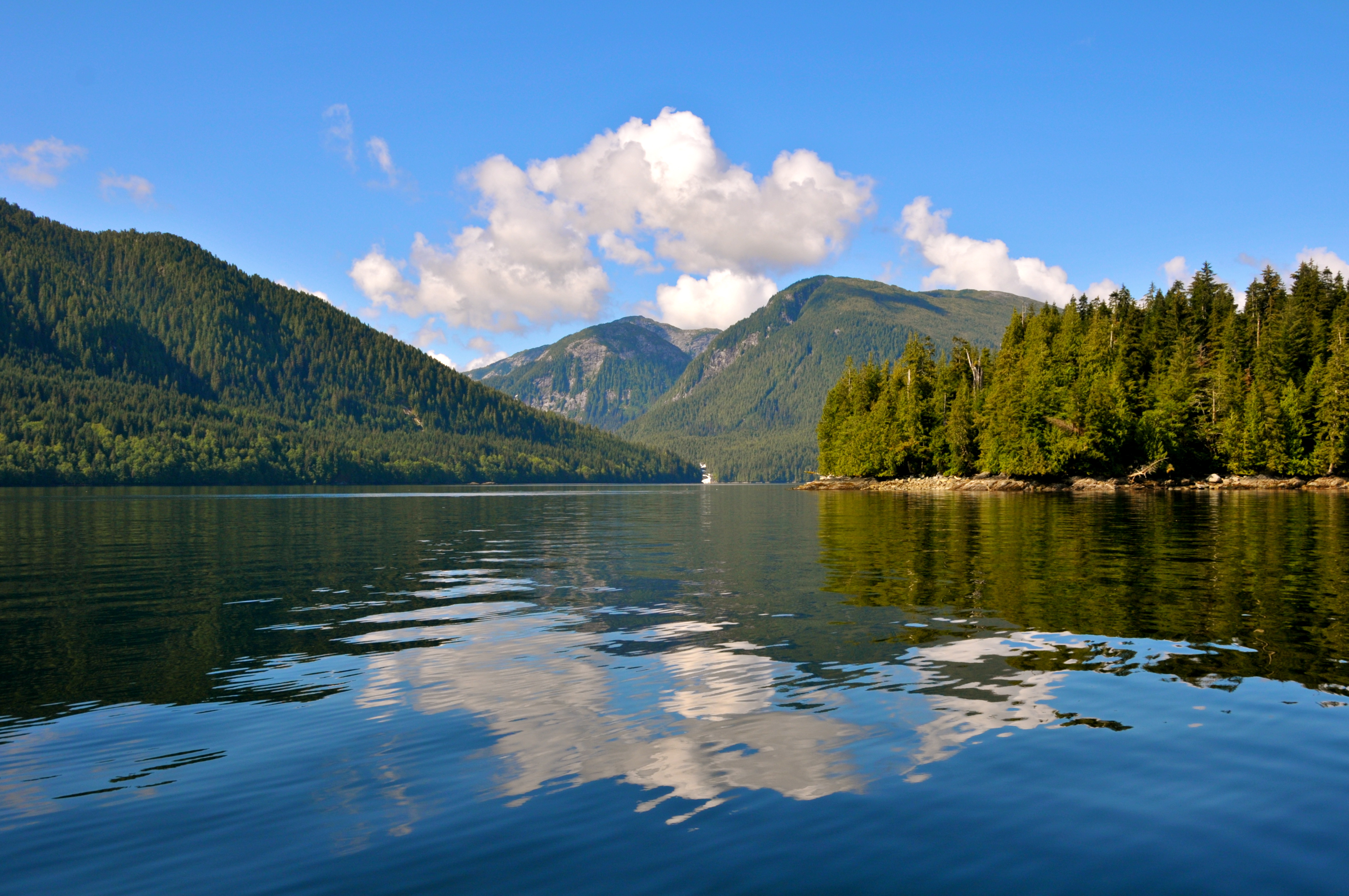
- Princess Royal Channel near Work Island

- Location in British Columbia
- Location: British Columbia, Canada
- Coordinates: 53°10′N 128°40′W
- Type: Channel
- Ocean/sea sources: Pacific Ocean

Princess Royal Channel is a channel in the North Coast region of the Canadian province of British Columbia, separating Princess Royal Island from the mainland. The southern half of the channel is also called Graham Reach, and the northern half Fraser Reach.

The southern half of the channel was first charted by George Vancouver in 1793 with his ships Discovery and Chatham, which anchored about mid-way up the channel; James Johnstone, one of Vancouver's lieutenants, charted its northern half the same summer.
