= Mosquito Creek (British Columbia) =

Creek in British Columbia, Canada

Coordinates: 53°06′57″N 121°35′15″W

Mosquito Creek is a creek in the Cariboo region of British Columbia. The creek is a tributary of Willow River. This creek was discovered to be gold bearing in 1861. It has been mined and produced an estimated $3,500,000 in gold.

== See also ==
- List of rivers of British Columbia
