= Cornice Mountain (Cambria Icefield) =

Mountain in British Columbia, Canada

Coordinates: 56°04′25″N 129°36′16″W

Cornice Mountain, 2,339 metres (7,674 ft), is a mountain in the Cambria Icefield of the Boundary Ranges of the northern Coast Mountains in British Columbia, Canada. The peak is on the north flank of the Cambria Icefield, south of Strohn Creek and between Meziadin Lake and the Bear River Pass, northeast of the town of Stewart.

== See also ==
- Cornice Mountain (Stikine Icecap)
- Cornice Ridge
