= Kemano River =

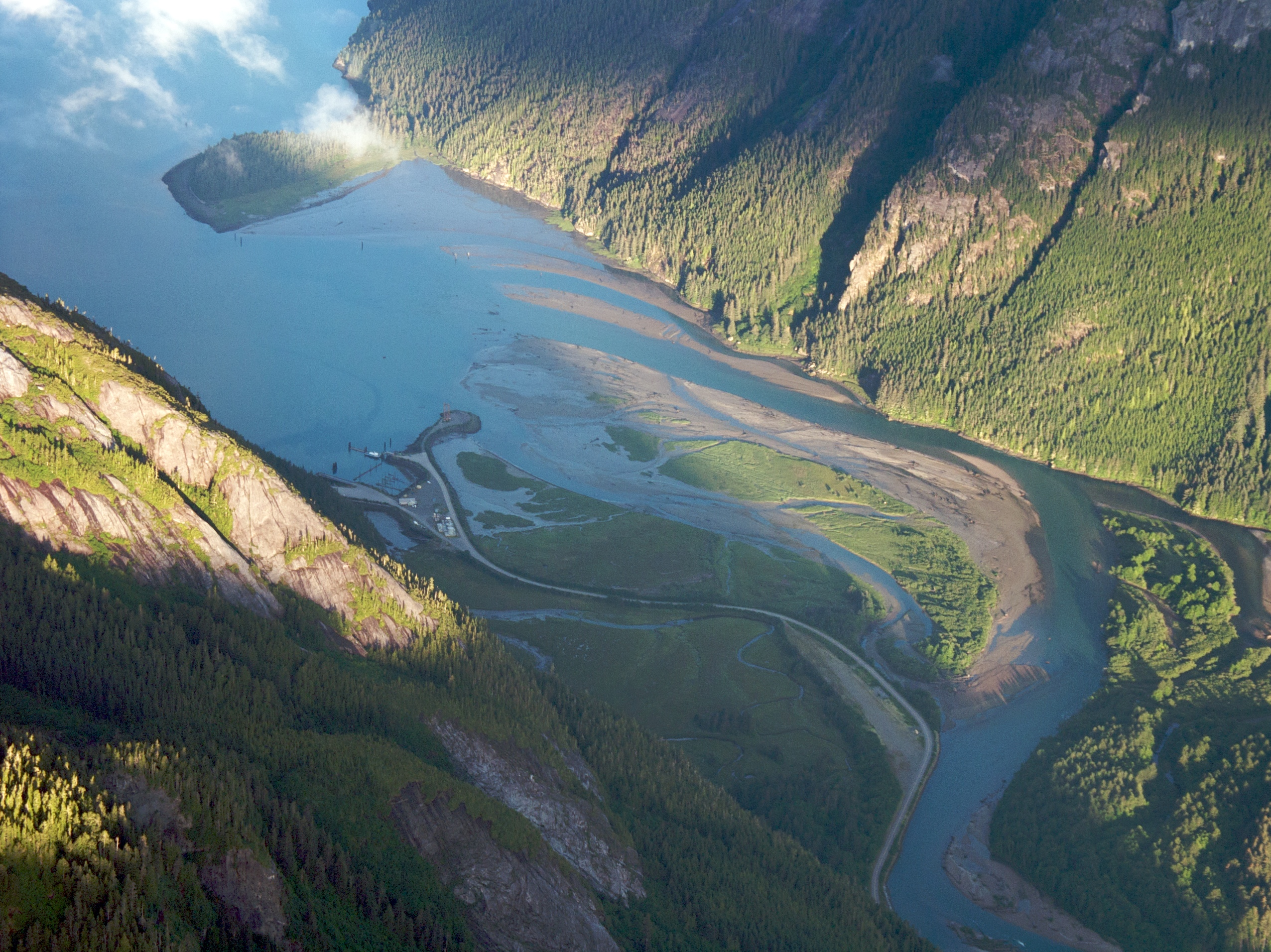
- Mouth of the Kemano River

- Mouth of Kemano River

Location
- Country: Canada
- Province: British Columbia
- District: Range 4 Coast Land District

Physical characteristics
- Source: Kitimat Ranges
  - location: Coast Mountains
- Mouth: Kemano Bay
  - location: Gardner Canal
  - coordinates: 53°28′16″N 128°8′12″W
  - elevation: 0 m (0 ft)

The Kemano River is a river in the Kitimat Ranges of the Coast Mountains in British Columbia, Canada. It flows into Kemano Bay on the Gardner Canal near the Kemano powerhouse and former townsite.

== See also ==
- List of rivers of British Columbia
