= Cornice Mountain (Stikine Icecap) =

Mountain in the country of Canada

Coordinates: 57°08′12″N 131°57′03″W

Cornice Mountain, 1503 m (4931 feet), is a mountain in the Stikine Icecap area of the Boundary Ranges in northwestern British Columbia, Canada. It is located southwest of the confluence of the Flood and Stikine Rivers.

== See also ==
- Cornice Mountain (Cambria Icefield)
- Cornice Ridge
