= Gardner Canal =

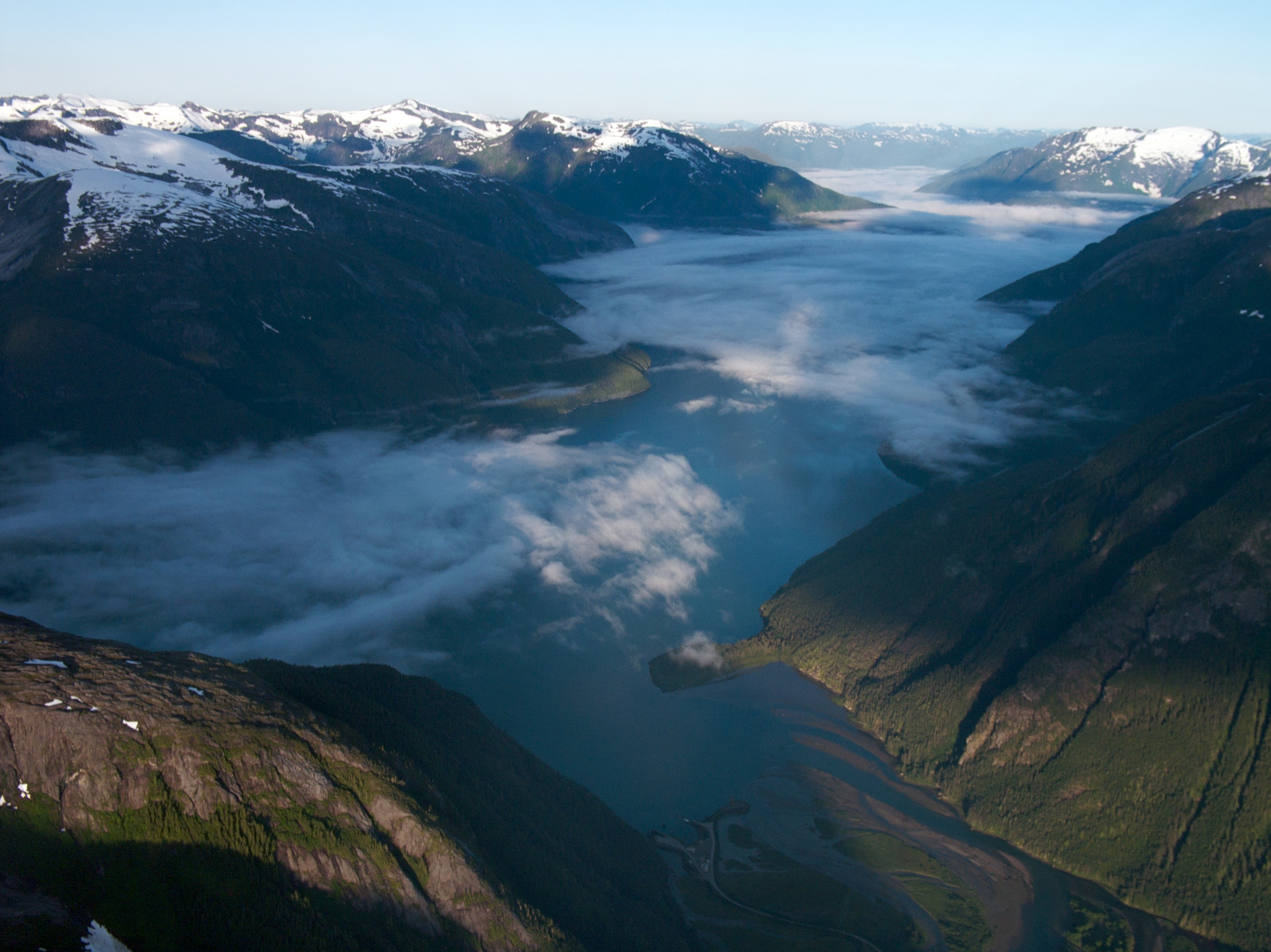
- Gardner Canal near Kemano

- Location in British Columbia
- Location: British Columbia, Canada
- Coordinates: 53°26′35″N 128°23′30″W
- Type: Fjord

The Gardner Canal is one of the principal inlets of the British Columbia Coast. Technically a side-inlet of the larger Douglas Channel, the Gardner Canal is still 90 km (56 mi) in length in its own right; total length of the waterways converging on the Douglas Channel is 320 km (200 mi) making it one of the largest fjord-complexes in the world.

== Name origin ==
It was named in 1793 by George Vancouver in honour of his friend and former commander, Alan Gardner, 1st Baron Gardner. One of his men, Joseph Whidbey, first charted it the same year.

== Geography ==
The entrance to the Gardner Canal is hidden behind Hawkesbury Island, and is accessed via Devastation Channel or Varney Passage which form the northeast and southeast flanks of that island.

Segments of the Gardner Canal are named "reaches". They are, from mouth to head, Alan Reach, Europa Reach, Barrie Reach, Whidbey Reach, and Egeria Reach. The extreme head is called Kitlope Anchorage. Side inlets include Ochwe Bay, Triumph Bay, Kiltuish Inlet, Owyacumish Bay, and Chief Mathews Bay.

== Kemano Generating Station ==
The Gardner Canal is the location of the Kemano Generating Station of the Nechako Diversion, which was built to supply power for an Alcan aluminum smelter in Kitimat. The generating station is located about halfway along the canal on its north bank, at the mouth of the Kemano River. At the head of the Gardner Canal is the mouth of the Kitlope River a major wildlife and wilderness preserve, the Kitlope Heritage Conservancy, an area of outstanding natural beauty and harsh weather.
