= Silverthrone Caldera =

Caldera in British Columbia, Canada

- Silverthrone Caldera Complex
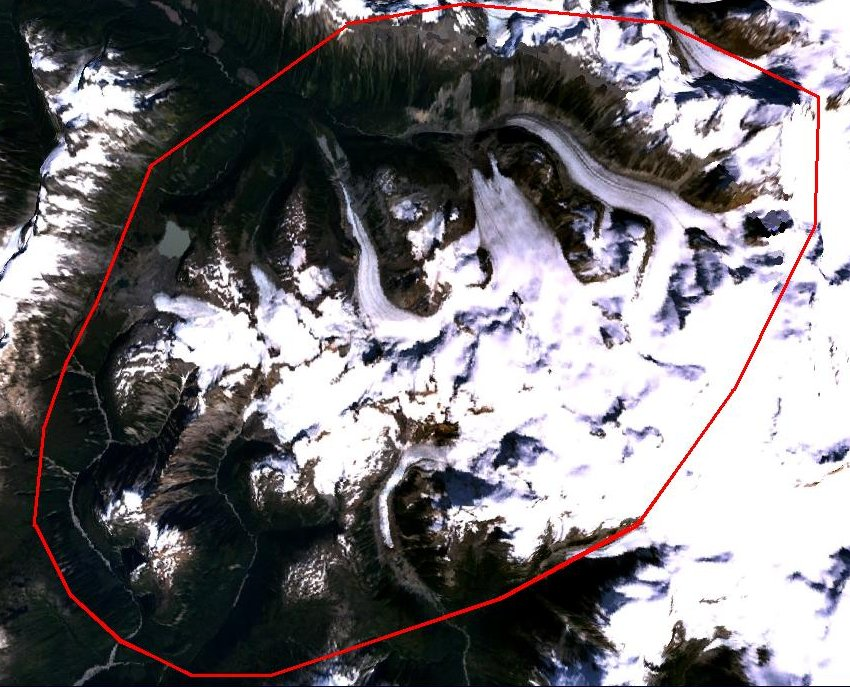
- Approximate extent of the Silverthrone Caldera

Highest point
- Peak: Silverthrone Mountain
- Elevation: 2,860 m (9,380 ft)
- Coordinates: 51°31′03″N 126°06′47″W

Dimensions
- Length: 25 km (16 mi)
- Width: 20 km (12 mi)

Geography
- Location in British Columbia
- Interactive map of the Silverthrone area
- Country: Canada
- Province: British Columbia
- District: Range 2 Coast Land District
- Parent range: Pacific Ranges
- Topo map(s): NTS 92M9 Machmell River; NTS 92M8 Catto Creek

Geology
- Formed by: Subduction zone volcanism
- Rock age(s): 750,000 years and younger
- Rock type(s): Rhyolite, dacite, andesite, basaltic andesite
- Volcanic arc: Cascade Volcanic Arc
- Volcanic belt: Garibaldi Volcanic Belt; Pemberton Volcanic Belt
- Last eruption: Unknown

Climbing
- Access: Helicopter or trekking on foot

The Silverthrone Caldera, also referred to as the Silverthrone Caldera Complex, is a volcano in Range 2 Coast Land District of British Columbia, Canada. It lies within the Pacific Ranges of the Coast Mountains and reaches an elevation of 2,860 metres (9,380 feet), although some sources give the elevation as high as 3,160 m (10,370 ft). The caldera is about 25 by 20 kilometres (16 by 12 miles) in size and has been deeply eroded, resulting in the formation of rugged topography. Several glacial meltwater streams originating from the volcano flow through valleys in the Pacific Ranges. These include the Pashleth, Selman and Catto creeks and the Kingcome and Wakeman rivers. The caldera contains several named mountains, including Mounts Somolenko, Overill, Kinch, Squire, Ardern and Calli, as well as Petrovsky Peak and Silverthrone Mountain.

Volcanic rocks deposited by eruptions of the Silverthrone Caldera and associated vents include rhyolites, dacites, andesites and basaltic andesites. They are exposed in valleys, but at higher elevations they are largely buried under glacial ice of the 3,600 km^{2} (1,400 mi^{2}) Ha-Iltzuk Icefield. These rocks comprise three geological units: a 750,000-year-old basal breccia unit, a 400,000-year-old unit of overlying lava flows and domes, and a less than 13,000-year-old series of lava flows and pyroclastic cones. Small magnitude, shallow earthquakes have been recorded near the volcano since 1980, but they have not been demonstrated to be magmatic in origin. The main potential hazard posed by future volcanism is to air traffic if explosive eruptions were to occur from the caldera.

The Silverthrone Caldera was a source of obsidian for Indigenous peoples during the pre-contact era. Geological studies have been conducted at the volcano since at least the 1960s, but its very remote location has impeded detailed fieldwork. As a result, the eruptive history of the caldera is not well-known and its affinity to the Garibaldi Volcanic Belt remains unclear. The volcano was studied in the 1970s as a potential source of geothermal energy. It can be reached by helicopter or by trekking on foot through nearby valleys.

== Names and etymology ==
The Silverthrone Caldera has been described as the Silverthrone Caldera Complex and the Silverthrone Depression. Other terms, such as the Silverthrone volcanic complex and the Silverthrone volcanic field, refer to the caldera and associated volcanic rocks. Such terms are derived from Silverthrone Mountain, a volcanic feature associated with the caldera whose name has been reported in Canadian Alpine Journal articles as early as 1933. In a 1968 Geological Survey of Canada report, the eruptive products of the caldera were referred to as the Mount Silverthrone volcanic complex by Jack Souther, Canada's first volcanologist.

The Silverthrone Caldera also shares its name with Silverthrone Glacier, an outlet glacier of the local Ha-Iltzuk Icefield which covers approximately 3,600 km^{2} (1,400 mi^{2}) of the southern Coast Mountains. Silverthrone is descriptive of the icy landscape; it may have been coined by Don Munday who, with his wife Phyllis Munday, carried out the first ascent of Silverthrone Mountain in 1936.

== Geography ==
=== Location and climate ===
The volcano is 55 km (34 mi) north of Kingcome Inlet and 60 km (37 mi) northwest of Knight Inlet in southwestern British Columbia, Canada. It lies in a rugged, ice-dominated portion of the Pacific Ranges which are the southernmost subdivision of the Coast Mountains. The surrounding mountains are the highest in British Columbia south of the Saint Elias Mountains; Mount Waddington northeast of the head of Knight Inlet has an elevation of 4,016 m (13,176 ft) and is the highest mountain entirely within British Columbia. Characterizing the landscape at higher elevations are glaciers and extensive icefields, although bedrock composed of granitoids is greatly exposed. The area is part of the Central Pacific Ranges Ecosection, one of seven ecosections comprising the Pacific Ranges Ecoregion.

Moist air originating from the Pacific Ocean ascends over Queen Charlotte Sound, Queen Charlotte Strait or the Vancouver Island Ranges before reaching the Pacific Ranges. While ascending the Pacific Ranges, this air comes in contact with cold air from the British Columbia Interior and drops significant precipitation in the form of heavy rains or snow. The heavy rains are absorbed by wet mountain hemlock subalpine forests on mid-elevation slopes and wet western hemlock forests in valleys and lower elevation slopes. Alpine vegetation is restricted to a narrow band between the subalpine forests and the higher icefields. There are no settlements near the Silverthrone Caldera, although summer sport fishing recreation camps and logging operations have been in the area.

=== Drainage ===
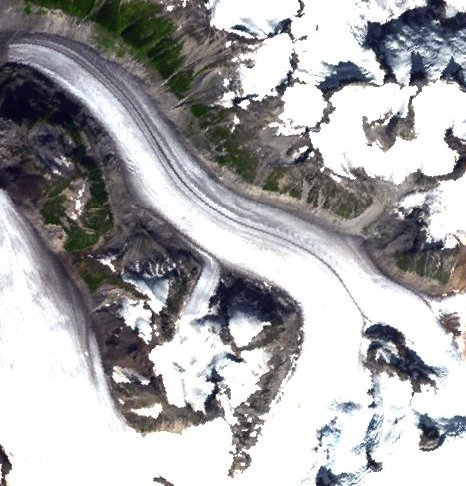
Pashleth Glacier in 2008

From Kingcome Glacier in the southern part of the caldera, the Kingcome River flows south into the head of Kingcome Inlet northeast of Broughton Island. Trudel Creek, a tributary of the Kingcome River, originates from the head of Trudel Glacier and flows southwest along the inferred southeastern boundary of the Silverthrone Caldera. Charnaud Creek originates from a valley-filling lava flow adjacent to the southeastern boundary of the caldera and flows southwest into the Kingcome River. At the terminus of Pashleth Glacier in the northern part of the caldera is Pashleth Creek; it flows northwest into the Machmell River which flows west into Owikeno Lake at the head of Rivers Inlet.

Selman Creek, a tributary of Pashleth Creek, flows to the northeast from Selman Lake at the northwestern end of the Silverthrone Caldera. From an unnamed glacier just south of Selman Lake at the western end of the central volcanic ridge, the Wakeman River flows south into Wakeman Sound of Kingcome Inlet. Catto Creek originates from an unnamed glacier on the central volcanic ridge and flows southwest across the inferred southwestern boundary of the caldera before it empties into the Wakeman River. Silverthrone Glacier flows southeastward from Silverthrone Mountain through a valley to Klinaklini Glacier, which lies at the head of the West Klinaklini River.

=== Mountains ===
Silverthrone Mountain is the highest point of the Silverthrone Caldera, whose summit has variously been given elevations of 2,860 m (9,380 ft), 2,865 m (9,400 ft) and 3,160 m (10,370 ft). Mount Somolenko, 2,660 m (8,730 ft) in elevation, lies within the caldera south of Silverthrone Mountain between the Klinaklini and Kingcome glaciers. It is named after Nicholas Somolenko, a leading aircraftman of the Royal Canadian Air Force who was killed in World War II when his aircraft was shot down on June 7, 1944. Just southwest of Silverthrone Mountain also between the Klinaklini and Kingcome glaciers is Mount Overill, so-named after William Overill who was a Canadian Army soldier killed in action on October 6, 1943, during World War II. Mount Kinch, 2,380 m (7,810 ft) in elevation, lies between the Trudel and Kingcome glaciers. Its name is an extension of the World War II theme; James Kinch was a signalman of the Royal Canadian Corps of Signals who died on September 7, 1941. Petrovsky Peak, west of Mount Kinch, reaches an elevation of 2,300 m (7,500 ft).

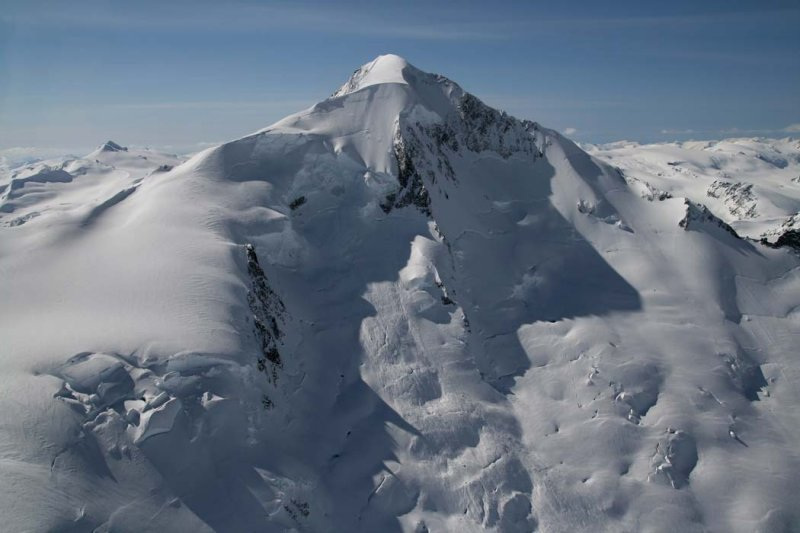
Northeast face of Silverthrone Mountain

Mount Ardern, southwest of Silverthrone Mountain at the head of the Kingcome River, consists of loose volcanic rock. It has an elevation of 2,360 m (7,740 ft) and is named after James Ardern, a Canadian Army soldier killed in action on October 3, 1944, during World War II. Between the Kingcome and Silverthrone glaciers is Mount Squire, another peak composed of loose volcanic rock with an elevation of 2,390 m (7,840 ft). Its name is also an extension of the World War II theme; James Squire was a Canadian Army soldier killed in action on July 18, 1943. South of Silverthrone Mountain is Mount Calli, which reaches an elevation of 2,420 m (7,940 ft) north of the head of the Kingcome River. It is named after Canadian Army soldier Kenneth Calli who was killed in action on August 15, 1944, during World War II.

These mountains are part of the Silverthrone Group, an extensive group of mountains bounded in the east by the Klinaklini and North Klinaklini rivers, in the north by Owikeno Lake, Rivers Inlet and the Sheemahant River, in the west by the Pacific Ocean and in the south by Knight Inlet. Many of the mountains in this group consist of volcanic rocks, but it also includes non-volcanic mountains such as Mount Fitzgerald, whose summit consists of granite. The highest mountains in the Silverthrone Group are Silverthrone Mountain, Rampart Peak, Crumble Peak and an unnamed peak with an elevation of 2,730 m (8,960 ft); Silverthrone Mountain is the highest.

== Geology ==
=== Tectonic setting ===
Location of Silverthrone in relation to other volcanoes in the Garibaldi Volcanic Belt

The relationship of the Silverthrone Caldera to other volcanoes in southwestern British Columbia remains unclear. This is because there have been very few geological studies conducted at the caldera. It has been considered to be part of the Garibaldi Volcanic Belt, but it lies 190 km (120 mi) west-northwest of the main trend of this volcanic zone, making its connection to the Garibaldi Volcanic Belt questionable. The volcano has also been included as part of the much older Pemberton Volcanic Belt, which overlaps with the trend of the Garibaldi Volcanic Belt near Meager Creek to the southeast. Both volcanic belts were formed by subduction zone volcanism along the continental margin of western North America in the last 29 million years and are part of the Cascade Volcanic Arc.

Silverthrone is sometimes excluded from the Garibaldi Volcanic Belt and the Cascade Volcanic Arc due to it being sketchily known and ambiguous in its affinity. When included, Silverthrone is the northernmost major eruptive centre of both the Garibaldi Volcanic Belt and the Cascade Volcanic Arc. The types of volcanic rocks found at the Silverthrone Caldera are comparable to those in continental arcs; they belong to the calc-alkaline magma series. Likewise, the lifespan of the caldera is comparable to most of the large evolved eruptive centres in the Cascade Volcanic Arc, which have lifespans ranging from 100,000 to 1,000,000 years. The Smithsonian Institution's Global Volcanism Program lists the tectonic setting of the Silverthrone Caldera as a subduction zone and the underlying continental crust more than 25 km (16 mi) thick. Further studies of the magmatic products of the caldera are required to provide further insights on mantle and slab processes.

The tectonic settings of Silverthrone and its closest prominent neighbour, the Franklin Glacier Complex about 55 km (34 mi) to the east-southeast, appear to differ from other volcanoes in the Garibaldi Volcanic Belt. The main portion of this volcanic belt, which extends from the Salal Glacier volcanic complex in the north to the Watts Point volcanic centre in the south, is the result of subduction of the Juan de Fuca Plate beneath the North American Plate. Immediately north of the Juan de Fuca Plate is the Explorer Plate, which separated from the Juan de Fuca Plate along the Nootka Fault about four million years ago. The Silverthrone and Franklin Glacier complexes lie inboard of the Explorer Plate; subduction of this tectonic plate beneath the North American Plate occurs at a rate of about 2 centimetres (0.79 inches) per year. However, both tectonic plates are currently locked to some degree in the Cascadia subduction zone.

=== Structure ===
Illustration of caldera collapse

The Silverthrone Caldera is a roughly 25 km (16 mi) long and 20 km (12 mi) wide subsidence structure in the central Coast Crystalline Complex. Such structures form when magma chambers are partially emptied during volcanic eruptions, resulting in the land surface subsiding and the area above the magma chamber collapsing. Subsidence of the area above the magma chamber results in the formation of steep-sided ring faults; these are cylindrical fractures around the edges of calderas. Calderas as large as Silverthrone form as a result of massive Plinian eruptions, which send ash columns high into the stratosphere and create large-scale pyroclastic flows. These caldera-forming eruptions are orders of magnitude larger than the 1980 eruption of Mount St. Helens; they range from 6 to 8 on the Volcanic Explosivity Index. Their extreme explosivity is caused by silica-rich magma which cools on the land surface in the form of volcanic rocks such as dacite and rhyolite. Silverthrone is one of the largest centres of Quaternary acidic volcanism in British Columbia as determined from reconnaissance mapping.

Silverthrone is similar in size to the much younger Aira Caldera in Southern Kyushu, Japan. Its inferred boundaries are exposed to the south and west whereas the northern and eastern boundaries are obscured under volcanic deposits and glacial ice, respectively. Unlike the neighbouring Franklin Glacier Complex, whose volcanic rocks have been mostly eroded away to expose underlying subvolcanic intrusions, Silverthrone still possesses mainly volcanic rocks. The main volcanic rocks found at the caldera are rhyolites, dacites, andesites and basaltic andesites which comprise breccias, lava domes, lava flows and volcanic cones. Deep dissection of these volcanic deposits by erosion has created the current rugged topography, although some of them remain hidden under glacial ice at higher elevations. The volcanic deposits extend over a distance of more than 25 km (16 mi) and vary in elevation from near sea level to 2,860 or 3,160 m (9,380 or 10,370 ft). They have a volume at least twice as that of the Mount Meager complex, which consists of 20 km^{3} (4.8 mi^{3}) of volcanic rocks.

Underlying the eruptive products of the Silverthrone Caldera are older rocks of the Coast Plutonic Complex. This 1,700 km (1,100 mi) long and 50–175 km (31–109 mi) wide geological feature is the largest magmatic arc of the North American Cordillera and one of the largest subduction-related plutonic rock assemblages on Earth. Dominated by tonalite, diorite and quartz diorite, the Coast Plutonic Complex is also one of the least felsic (Note: Felsic pertains to magmatic rocks that are enriched with silicon, oxygen, aluminum, sodium and potassium.) batholith-like belts encircling the Pacific Ocean. It is Early Jurassic-to-Paleogene in age and formed during a time when large-scale terrane and magmatic accretion led to significant continental growth in the North American Cordillera.

=== Geothermal potential ===
Silverthrone was studied for producing geothermal energy in the 1970s due to its potential similarity to the Mount Meager complex which is the most advanced, volcano-hosted, high temperature geothermal energy project in Canada. Evidence for a geothermal system at Silverthrone includes hot springs, geologically recent volcanism and extensive hydrothermal alteration. There is limited heat flow data available for the volcano, but if a geothermal system is present, it would potentially be hosted in the local basement rocks. No flow rates for the local hot springs have been reported and the heat exchange potential remains unknown. At least one hot spring with a recorded temperature of 50 °C (122 °F) occurs along the edge of the Silverthrone Caldera. As of 2016, the only geothermal exploration conducted at Silverthrone has been geological mapping; the rugged terrain poses an issue for drilling operations.

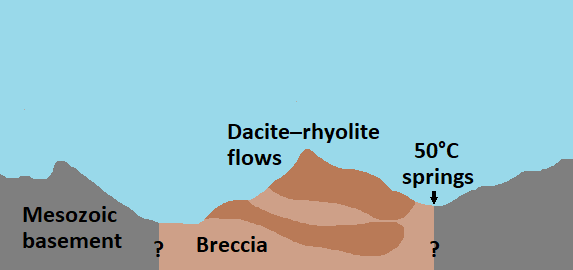
A cross section through the Silverthrone Caldera, showing the location of hot springs

The lack of detailed geothermal analysis for the Silverthrone Caldera is due to its very remote location and the lack of electrical infrastructure at the volcano. As a result, geothermal exploration at the volcano is less favourable than elsewhere in British Columbia, such as at Mount Cayley, Mount Garibaldi and Mount Meager. Based on the volume of the siliceous volcanic rocks found at Silverthrone, its geothermal power potential is 2,000 megawatts, which is comparable to that for the Mount Edziza region but greater than those for Mount Cayley and Meager Creek combined. Unlike the Meager Creek–Mount Cayley complex and the Mount Edziza region which have high and medium surface thermal manifestations, respectively, the surface thermal manifestation at Silverthrone is low. Nevertheless, there is a good possibility of finding a geothermal resource that is less than 80 °C (176 °F).

In a 1980 conference report, Jack Souther wrote that Silverthrone was about 150 km (93 mi) from the nearest transmission line. He also wrote that geothermal power from the volcano could possibly be used to support local industry on the British Columbia Coast; Silverthrone was said to be "relatively close to good harbours". As of 2016, the closest transmission line to Silverthrone is more than 150 km (93 mi) away. A submarine cable would be needed if geothermal power from the volcano were to be added to the provincial grid.

=== Eruptive history ===
The eruptive history of the Silverthrone Caldera is not well-known due to limited geological studies. However, it is probably similar in age to those of other volcanoes in the Garibaldi Volcanic Belt. Three stages of volcanic activity have been identified at the caldera, each of which has been radiometrically dated. Most of the volcanic deposits inside the Silverthrone Caldera appear to have been erupted between 900,000 and 100,000 years ago during the Pleistocene epoch. According to the Smithsonian Institution's Global Volcanism Program, the last eruption of the Silverthrone Caldera is unknown. However, there is credible evidence for the caldera having been active during the current Holocene epoch, which began about 11,700 years ago. Radiocarbon dating indicates that the latest volcanic eruptions occurred in the last 13,000 years; the volcanic deposits from these eruptions postdate the current topography. The Silverthrone Caldera has been much more recently active than the neighbouring Franklin Glacier Complex, which has yielded dates no younger than 2.2 ± 0.1 million years.

==== First stage ====
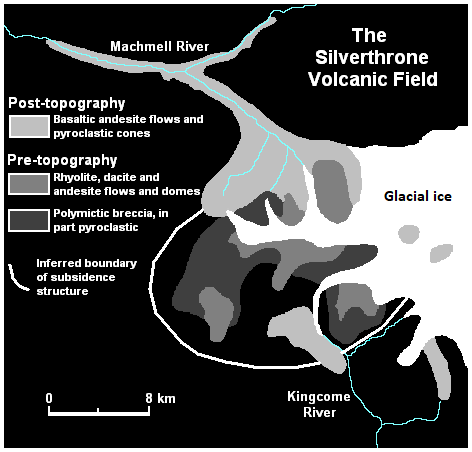
Geological map of the Silverthrone volcanic field displaying three volcanic phases and an outline of the caldera

Volcanism during the first stage of activity about 750,000 years ago deposited a 1,200 m (3,900 ft) thick breccia unit at the base of the intracaldera sequence. The breccia is deeply eroded, exposed in valley bottoms and has been locally welded together by volcanic heat. Angular to subangular granitic, metamorphic and volcanic fragments up to 3 m (9.8 ft) in diameter, derived from the underlying basement rocks, occur in the breccia which has a white to light grey matrix. Characterizing the welded breccia is an eutaxitic texture, a banded appearance which forms when pumice-rich material is erupted explosively. After being deposited by explosive eruptions, the pumice-rich material is quickly covered and compressed by overlying rocks while still in a hot, plastic state.

There is evidence for the basal breccia having been deposited during caldera collapse. This includes a profusion of dikes within the breccia but not in the surrounding country rocks, as well as the existence of irregular subvolcanic intrusions. The breccia also has steep contacts with the older country rocks; this is indicative of a fault-bounded structure. Potassium–argon dating of rhyolite glass about 100 m (330 ft) above the basal breccia has yielded a date of 0.75 ± 0.08 million years. This date is consistent with the high rates of erosion and tectonic uplift recorded elsewhere in the Coast Mountains.

==== Second stage ====
The second stage of volcanic activity about 400,000 years ago issued a series of lava domes and flows over the basal breccia deposited during the first stage. These eruptive products are rhyolitic, dacitic and andesitic in composition; the lava flows reach a composite thickness of 900 m (3,000 ft). Like the basal breccia, erosion has greatly modified the lava domes and flows of this second stage of volcanic activity. Near the summit of Silverthrone Mountain in the Ha-Iltzuk Icefield are overlapping andesite and rhyolite domes, which most likely formed during this stage of volcanism. Potassium–argon dating of an andesite flow overlying rhyolite in the south-central part of the caldera has yielded a date of 0.4 ± 0.1 million years; this date is also consistent with the high rates of uplift and erosion recorded elsewhere in the Coast Mountains.

==== Third stage ====
Volcanism during the third stage was characterized by the formation of pyroclastic cones and the eruption of basaltic andesite lava flows, most of which issued from vents around the perimeter of the caldera. The largest lava flow is continuously exposed for more than 25 km (16 mi) in the Pashleth Creek and Machmell River valleys; it has a blocky surface and originated from the northern margin of the caldera. A relatively small basaltic andesite flow at the head of the Kingcome River originated inside the southern part of the caldera and travelled to the southeast just outside the inferred boundary of this collapse structure. The lava flow was considered to be of Holocene age by Natural Resources Canada and is in the form of an eroded volcanic outcrop at the mouth of Trudel Creek. A north–south trending basaltic andesite flow on the southeastern side of the caldera originated under glacial ice at the head of Charnaud Creek. It was also considered to be of Holocene age by Natural Resources Canada and, like the aforementioned lava flow, it is in the form of an eroded volcanic outcrop. Several pyroclastic cones were formed at higher elevations on the eastern side of the caldera; the eroded remains of these cones project through glacial ice.

Potassium–argon dating of the basaltic andesite flow occupying the Machmell River and Pashleth Creek valleys has yielded ages of 1.0 ± 0.2 million years and 1.1 ± 0.1 million years. These ages are considered to be too old since high-energy streams originating from glaciers have only begun to erode a channel along the edge of the lava flow. An explanation for the erroneous ages lies in the presence of xenoliths (Note: Xenoliths are rock fragments that become enveloped in a larger mass of originally molten rock.) and other inclusions from the underlying Mesozoic basement, which can negatively influence the ages of rocks in radiometric dating. Radiocarbon dating has yielded a date of 12,200 ± 140 years for barnacles buried by the lava flow. This radiocarbon date was obtained 8.5 km (5.3 mi) upstream from the mouth of the Machmell River and provides a maximum age for the lava flow, which may have been extruded much more recently. The low degree of erosion of this lava flow by the Machmell River, coupled with the presence of unconsolidated glaciofluvial (Note: Glaciofluvial pertains to streams that originate from melting glaciers.) sediments under the flow, suggest that it was erupted less than 1,000 years ago.

=== Volcanic hazards ===
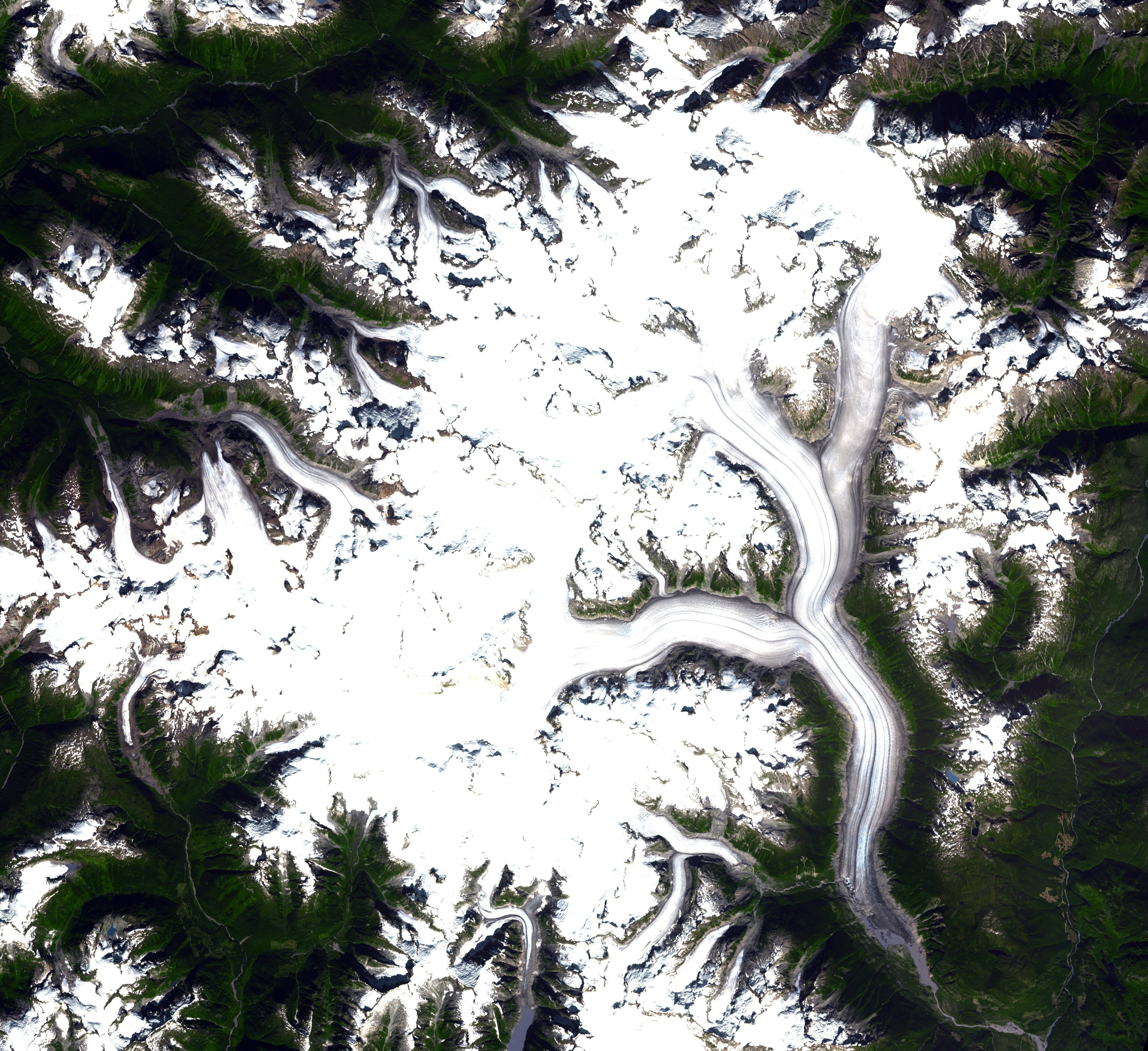
Melting of the Ha-Iltzuk Icefield, caused by renewed volcanism at the Silverthrone Caldera, could result in lahars or debris flows.

A review of Canadian volcanoes published in 2024 assessed Silverthrone as the only "moderate" threat volcano in Canada. The review noted that although the volcano scores highly for primary volcanic hazard factors, it has a relatively low exposure score due to its very remote location. Therefore, the review gave it a lower hazard rating than for Mounts Edziza, Price, Cayley, Meager and Garibaldi, which were rated as "high" and "very high" threat volcanoes. Small magnitude, shallow earthquakes have been recorded near Silverthrone since 1980. Because this seismicity is not demonstrably magmatic in origin, the volcano was given a score of 0.5 on a scale of 0 to 1 for observed seismic unrest. The presence of seismicity suggests that the caldera is potentially active and that its volcanic hazards may be significant. Silverthrone mainly poses a threat to air traffic since there are no communities nearby. Volcanic ash reduces visibility and can cause jet engine failure, as well as damage to other aircraft systems.

Silverthrone was rated "high" in the 2024 review for volcano knowledge uncertainty and was scored "positive" for sector collapse potential. Sector collapses are one of the most hazardous volcanic events on Earth, involving the structural failure and subsequent collapse of at least 1 km^{3} (0.24 mi^{3}) of a volcano. Such collapses can result from destabilization by magma intrusion or associated phreatomagmatic eruptions. More than 1 km^{3} (0.24 mi^{3}) of snow and ice permanently covers Silverthrone, making it a potential source of lahars or debris flows which typically enter river valleys. Eruptions may trigger lahars by melting snow and ice, but lahars can also begin as landslides of wet, hydrothermally altered rock on steep slopes.

=== Monitoring ===
Like other volcanoes in Canada, the Silverthrone Caldera is not monitored closely enough by the Geological Survey of Canada to ascertain its activity level. The Canadian National Seismograph Network has been established to monitor earthquakes throughout Canada, but it is too far away to provide an accurate indication of activity under the volcano. It may sense an increase in seismic activity if the Silverthrone Caldera becomes highly restless, but this may only provide a warning for a large eruption; the system might detect activity only once the volcano has started erupting. If the Silverthrone Caldera were to erupt, mechanisms exist to orchestrate relief efforts. The Interagency Volcanic Event Notification Plan was created to outline the notification procedure of some of the main agencies that would respond to an erupting volcano in Canada, an eruption close to the Canada–United States border or any eruption that would affect Canada.

== Human history ==
=== Kingcome obsidian ===
Location of the Silverthrone Caldera in relation to other obsidian sources in British Columbia

Around 2013, Silverthrone was identified as the source of the Kingcome obsidian by cultural resource management archaeologists and the Tsawataineuk First Nation. This makes the caldera one of several volcanoes in British Columbia with known obsidian source material often found at archaeological sites throughout the province; others include Mount Garibaldi, Anahim Peak, the Ilgachuz Range and the Mount Edziza volcanic complex. Artifacts made of Kingcome obsidian have been found at archaeological sites in the Sunshine Coast region, which was the location of trading between Indigenous peoples about 5,000–2,000 years ago. Obsidian from Mount Garibaldi occurs with the Kingcome obsidian in this part of British Columbia, as does obsidian from Whitewater Ridge and Gregory Creek in the U.S. state of Oregon.

The Kingcome and Mount Garibaldi obsidians are of only moderately good quality because they contain relatively large phenocrysts; these crystals would have made both obsidians more difficult to work with during the crafting of artifacts. As a result, artifacts made of Kingcome and Mount Garibaldi obsidian were not traded as widely as artifacts made of other types of volcanic glass. Kingcome obsidian mainly occurs north of Powell River and in Desolation Sound where ancient settlements were established. The Kingcome obsidian source lies in Kwakwakaʼwakw territory, which covers the northern end of Vancouver Island and surrounding lands.

=== Geological studies ===
In 1967, Silverthrone was one of five eruptive centres visited by Jack Souther as part of a study to investigate geologically young volcanic rocks in the Canadian Cordillera. Specimens of the volcano were collected for chemical and petrographic analyses. Souther also noted the basal breccia, the overlying lava flows, the deep dissection of the volcanic deposits and a possible fault-bounded structure associated with the collapse of the caldera. The youngest lava flows occupying the local valleys were said to be probably no older than Early Pleistocene age. The other four eruptive centres visited by Jack Souther in 1967 were the Mount Edziza volcanic complex in the Northern Cordilleran Volcanic Province and the Rainbow, Ilgachuz and Itcha ranges in the Anahim Volcanic Belt.

Further studies were carried out by Green et al. (1988) who inferred the boundaries of the caldera and obtained the four aforementioned potassium–argon dates from three locations in and adjacent to the caldera. Mejia et al. (2002) sampled basaltic andesite flows from Silverthrone and obtained 16 potassium–argon dates. Most of these dates indicated that the lava flows were extruded sometime in the last 120,000 years, but two of them yielded ages as old as 400,000 years. As of 2023, the remoteness of the Silverthrone Caldera has impeded detailed fieldwork.

=== Mineral exploration ===
A mineralized dacitic breccia pipe was discovered at the Silverthrone Caldera in the 1990s following retreat of the Kingcome Glacier headwall. It was said to contain multicoloured clay, opal, malachite, pyrolusite and celadonite; the latter four were said to be characterized by intense hues of blue and green. The breccia pipe, partially enclaved by dacite pitchstone, was considered to be hydrothermal in origin. It was obscured by Kingcome Glacier in 1979 as evidenced by the photos and topographic maps of that time. A report of the British Columbia Prospectors Assistance Program listed copper and gemstones as commodities in the breccia pipe.

== Conservation ==
Part of Silverthrone lies in the Catto Creek Conservancy, a 7,249-hectare (17,910-acre) conservation area in Range 2 Coast Land District established on August 23, 1973, under the Protected Areas of British Columbia Act. This protected area was mainly established to preserve a group of geomorphological features known as "the paint pots", (Note: The BC Parks entry for the Catto Creek Conservancy does not explain what "the paint pots" are, but an acid spring system in Kootenay National Park bears the same name; there are also springs in the Silverthrone area.) but it also allows recreational activities such as camping, hiking, fishing and hunting. Both wilderness and winter camping are permitted in the Catto Creek Conservancy, but no facilities are provided, such that visitors must be fully prepared and self-sufficient to camp in this conservancy.

== Accessibility ==
Access to the Silverthrone Caldera is difficult due to its very remote location in the Pacific Ranges of the Coast Mountains. It can be reached by charter helicopter from Tatlayoko Lake or Campbell River, the latter of which is the nearest town to the volcano. The flying times from Tatlayoko Lake and Campbell River are about one and two hours, respectively. A much more difficult way to access Silverthrone is to traverse one of the several intermontane valleys on foot, which can be reached from the British Columbia Coast or the Interior Plateau. The icefields of the Silverthrone area can be trekked on foot from the adjoining valleys.

== See also ==
- List of volcanoes in Canada
- List of Cascade volcanoes
- Volcanism of Western Canada
