= Silverthrone Group =

Mountain group in British Columbia, Canada

- Silverthrone Cluster
- Location within British Columbia
- Interactive map of the Silverthrone area

Highest point
- Peak: Silverthrone Mountain
- Elevation: 2,865 m (9,400 ft)
- Coordinates: 51°31′03″N 126°06′47″W

Dimensions
- Width: 60 km (37 mi)
- Area: 2,868 km^{2} (1,107 mi^{2})

Geography
- Country: Canada
- Province: British Columbia
- District: Range 2 Coast Land District
- Parent range: Pacific Ranges
- Topo map(s): NTS 92M9 Machmell River; NTS 92M8 Catto Creek; NTS 92N5 Klinaklini Glacier; NTS 92N4 Sim River; NTS 92N12 Trophy Lake; NTS 92M1 Atwaykellesse River; NTS 92M16 Sheemahant River; NTS 92N13 Knot Lakes

The Silverthrone Group, also called the Silverthrone Cluster, is an extensive group of mountains in the Pacific Ranges of British Columbia, Canada. It includes more than 30 named mountains, the highest of which is Silverthrone Mountain with an elevation of 2,865 metres (9,400 feet). The Silverthrone Group is bounded in the east by the Klinaklini and North Klinaklini rivers, in the south by Knight Inlet, in the west by the Pacific Ocean and in the north by Owikeno Lake, Rivers Inlet and the Sheemahant River. Climbing and explorations of the group began in at least 1900; some of the mountaineers involved in these activities were Don Munday, Phyllis Munday and John Clarke.

== Names and etymology ==
This mountain group has been called the Silverthrone Group by the British Columbia Mountaineering Club and the Silverthrone Cluster by the Bivouac Mountain Encyclopedia. Such terms are derived from Silverthrone Mountain, the highest point of the Silverthrone Group whose name has been reported in Canadian Alpine Journal articles as early as 1933. Silverthrone is descriptive of the icy landscape; it may have been coined by Don Munday who carried out the first ascent of Silverthrone Mountain along with his wife Phyllis Munday in 1936.

== Geography ==
The Silverthrone Group is 60 km (37 mi) wide and covers 2,868 km^{2} (1,107 mi^{2}) of the Pacific Ranges of the Coast Mountains. In some places, the Silverthrone Group is occupied by the Ha-Iltzuk Icefield, which covers 3,600 km^{2} (1,400 mi^{2}) of the southern Coast Mountains. The eastern boundary of the Silverthrone Group lies west of the Klinaklini and North Klinaklini rivers. To the south, the Silverthrone Group is bounded by Knight Inlet whereas the western boundary is marked by the Pacific Ocean. Bounding the northern end of the Silverthrone Group is Owikeno Lake, Rivers Inlet and the Sheemahant River. The group is west of Mount Waddington, the highest mountain entirely within British Columbia.

== Climbing and explorations ==
- 1900: Ernest Halliday and Harry Kirby
- 1927: C. N. Pretty and brother
- 1927: J. T. Underhill and a survey party
- 1936: Henry Hall, Don Munday, Phyllis Munday, Hans Fuhrer, Sherrett S. Chase and William H. Hinton
- 1967: Geological Survey of Canada parties
- 1973: John Clarke
- 1977: John Clarke and Jamie Sproule
- 1982: John Baldwin, Steven Ludwig, Brian Sheffield, Helen Sovdat and Graham Underhill
- 1984: John Baldwin and John Clarke
- 1986: Chris Cooper
- 1988: Emily Butler and John Clarke
- 2002: Lisa Baile, Jack Bryceland and Peter Pare

== Mountains ==
A British Columbia Mountaineering Club climber's guide lists the following mountains as part of the Silverthrone Group:

Name	Elevation	NTS map	Coordinates
Silverthrone Mountain	2,865 m (9,400 ft)	92M9 Machmell River	51°31′03″N 126°06′47″W
Rampart Peak	2,820 m (9,250 ft)	92N13 Knot Lakes	
Crumble Peak	2,740 m (8,990 ft)	92N13 Knot Lakes	
Mount Huth	2,670 m (8,760 ft)	92M9 Machmell River	51°34′39″N 126°06′26″W
Mount Somolenko	2,660 m (8,730 ft)	92M8 Catto Creek	51°28′09″N 126°06′09″W
Mount Fitzgerald	2,640 m (8,660 ft)	92M9 Machmell River	51°31′01″N 126°03′56″W
Triplex Mountain	2,640 m (8,660 ft)	92M9 Machmell River	51°31′19″N 126°04′53″W
Klinaklini Peak	2,631 m (8,632 ft)	92N4 Sim River	51°12′23″N 125°46′43″W
Mount Haslett	2,610 m (8,560 ft)	92M16 Sheemahant River	51°46′45″N 126°01′30″W
Mount Vallillee	2,610 m (8,560 ft)	92M16 Sheemahant River	51°47′04″N 126°01′18″W
Mount Dolter	2,610 m (8,560 ft)	92M9 Machmell River	51°34′14″N 126°02′56″W
Wahshilas Peak	2,605 m (8,547 ft)	92N4 Sim River	51°10′18″N 125°50′18″W
Mount Innocuous	2,580 m (8,460 ft)	92N13 Knot Lakes	
Mount Image	2,580 m (8,460 ft)	92M9 Machmell River	51°33′36″N 126°01′57″W
Mount Myron	2,580 m (8,460 ft)	92M9 Machmell River	51°32′48″N 126°01′31″W
Mount Willoughby	2,562 m (8,406 ft)	92M9 Machmell River	51°42′13″N 126°17′39″W
Three Cornered Hat	2,550 m (8,370 ft)	92N12 Trophy Lake	
Mount McBrinn	2,550 m (8,370 ft)	92M9 Machmell River	51°33′08″N 126°00′42″W
Mount Learn	2,510 m (8,230 ft)	92M16 Sheemahant River	51°47′49″N 126°03′35″W
Mount Swordy	2,510 m (8,230 ft)	92M9 Machmell River	51°42′42″N 126°00′43″W
Mount Pelletier	2,510 m (8,230 ft)	92M9 Machmell River	51°36′04″N 126°01′34″W
Mount Mann	2,500 m (8,200 ft)	92M9 Machmell River	51°35′09″N 126°07′51″W
Kolos Peak	2,480 m (8,140 ft)	92N5 Klinaklini Glacier	51°16′56″N 125°59′56″W
Mount Girard	2,480 m (8,140 ft)	92M9 Machmell River	51°35′29″N 126°06′43″W
Shaman Peak	2,472 m (8,110 ft)	92N5 Klinaklini Glacier	51°15′32″N 125°56′39″W
Mount Witts	2,470 m (8,100 ft)	92M9 Machmell River	51°35′34″N 126°08′43″W
Mount Calli	2,420 m (7,940 ft)	92M8 Catto Creek	51°29′19″N 126°06′28″W
Mount Lomas	2,420 m (7,940 ft)	92M9 Machmell River	51°36′50″N 126°02′20″W
Mount Squire	2,390 m (7,840 ft)	92M8 Catto Creek	51°25′36″N 126°13′20″W
Klisila Peak	2,390 m (7,840 ft)	92N5 Klinaklini Glacier	51°17′53″N 125°57′35″W
Mount Kinch	2,380 m (7,810 ft)	92M8 Catto Creek	51°26′18″N 126°11′05″W
Mount Conery	2,366 m (7,762 ft)	92M9 Machmell River	51°33′12″N 126°15′06″W
Mount Calloway (Note: Mistakenly called Mount Galloway in the British Columbia Mountaineering Club climber's guide.)	2,360 m (7,740 ft)	92M16 Sheemahant River	51°45′56″N 126°17′24″W
Mount Ardern	2,360 m (7,740 ft)	92M8 Catto Creek	51°25′09″N 126°13′07″W
Mount Storry	2,336 m (7,664 ft)	92M9 Machmell River	51°33′24″N 126°11′38″W
Mount Sawitsky	2,330 m (7,640 ft)	92M16 Sheemahant River	51°47′08″N 126°17′08″W
Mount Bohnet	2,330 m (7,640 ft)	92M16 Sheemahant River	51°44′59″N 126°10′39″W
Mount Hamatsa	2,330 m (7,640 ft)	92N5 Klinaklini Glacier	51°23′33″N 125°53′45″W
Mount Sandes	2,320 m (7,610 ft)	92M9 Machmell River	51°44′07″N 126°09′43″W
Fang Peak	2,300 m (7,500 ft)	92N5 Klinaklini Glacier	51°27′51″N 125°59′13″W
Mount Smee	2,300 m (7,500 ft)	92M9 Machmell River	51°37′05″N 126°13′23″W
Petrovsky Peak	2,300 m (7,500 ft)	92M8 Catto Creek	51°26′58″N 126°16′16″W
Mount Rogan	2,300 m (7,500 ft)	92M9 Machmell River	51°35′54″N 126°10′52″W
Mount McGovern	2,270 m (7,450 ft)	92M9 Machmell River	51°36′58″N 126°08′37″W
Mount Tran	2,120 m (6,960 ft)	92M9 Machmell River	51°30′41″N 126°25′44″W

== See also ==
- List of mountain ranges of Canada
