= Mount Calli =

Mountain in British Columbia, Canada

- Location within British Columbia
- Interactive map of Mount Calli

Highest point
- Elevation: 2,420 m (7,940 ft)
- Coordinates: 51°29′19″N 126°06′28″W

Geography
- Location: British Columbia, Canada
- District: Range 2 Coast Land District
- Parent range: Pacific Ranges
- Topo map: NTS 92M8 Catto Creek

Mount Calli is a mountain in Range 2 Coast Land District of British Columbia, Canada. It is located north of the head of the Kingcome River in the Ha-Iltzuk Icefield south of Silverthrone Mountain and north of Mount Somolenko. Mount Calli has a relatively low topographic prominence, giving it the appearance of a snow bump. The western side of the mountain contains a steep cliff that drops to the Pashleth Glacier. The Bivouac Mountain Encyclopedia gives an elevation of 2,432 m (7,979 ft) for Mount Calli whereas a climber's guide published by the British Columbia Mountaineering Club gives an elevation of 2,420 m (7,940 ft) for the mountain. In 1984, Mount Calli was climbed by mountaineer John Clarke via the south glacier.

The name of the mountain was adopted on the National Topographic System map 92M on March 28, 1967. It is named after Kenneth Calli, a Canadian Army private from North Vancouver who was killed in action on August 15, 1944, while serving with the Canadian Scottish Regiment during World War II. Calli is buried in the Bretteville-sur-Laize Canadian War Cemetery in the Calvados department of France.

== See also ==
- Silverthrone Caldera
- Silverthrone Group
