= Mount Kinch =

Mountain in British Columbia, Canada

- Location within British Columbia
- Interactive map of Mount Kinch

Highest point
- Elevation: 2,380 m (7,810 ft)
- Coordinates: 51°26′18″N 126°11′05″W

Geography
- Location: British Columbia, Canada
- District: Range 2 Coast Land District
- Parent range: Pacific Ranges
- Topo map: NTS 92M8 Catto Creek

Mount Kinch is a small knob in Range 2 Coast Land District of British Columbia, Canada. It is located between the Kingcome and Trudel glaciers in the Ha-Iltzuk Icefield northwest of the head of Knight Inlet. The Bivouac Mountain Encyclopedia gives an elevation of 2,421 m (7,943 ft) for Mount Kinch whereas a climber's guide published by the British Columbia Mountaineering Club gives an elevation of 2,380 m (7,810 ft) for the mountain. The name of the mountain was adopted on the National Topographic System map 92M on March 28, 1967.

The mountain is named after Oddrey James Kinch, a Canadian Army signalman and the child of James Cleveland Kinch and Elizabeth Kinch. Kinch died on September 7, 1941, while serving with the Royal Canadian Corps of Signals during World War II. He is buried in the Murrayville Cemetery of Langley, British Columbia.

== See also ==
- Silverthrone Caldera
- Silverthrone Group
