= Mount Squire =

Mountain in British Columbia, Canada

- Location within British Columbia
- Interactive map of Mount Squire

Highest point
- Elevation: 2,390 m (7,840 ft)
- Coordinates: 51°25′36″N 126°13′20″W

Geography
- Location: British Columbia, Canada
- District: Range 2 Coast Land District
- Parent range: Pacific Ranges
- Topo map: NTS 92M8 Catto Creek

Geology
- Rock type: Volcanic rock

Mount Squire is a mountain in Range 2 Coast Land District of British Columbia, Canada. It is located northwest of the head of Knight Inlet in the Ha-Iltzuk Icefield between the Kingcome and Silverthrone glaciers. The Bivouac Mountain Encyclopedia describes Mount Squire as a snow bump whereas the British Columbia Mountaineering Club notes that the mountain consists of loose volcanic rock. A climber's guide published by the British Columbia Mountaineering Club gives an elevation of 2,390 m (7,840 ft) for Mount Squire; this differs from the Bivouac Mountain Encyclopedia, which gives an elevation of 2,381 m (7,812 ft) for the mountain.

The name of the mountain was adopted on the National Topographic System map 92M on March 28, 1967. It is named after James H. J. Squire, a Canadian Army private from North Vancouver who was killed in action on July 18, 1943, while serving with the Seaforth Highlanders of Canada during World War II. Squire is buried in the Moro River Canadian War Cemetery near the Adriatic Sea in Ortona, Italy.

== See also ==
- Silverthrone Caldera
- Silverthrone Group
