= Mount Ardern =

Mountain in British Columbia, Canada

- Location within British Columbia
- Interactive map of Mount Ardern

Highest point
- Elevation: 2,360 m (7,740 ft)
- Coordinates: 51°25′09″N 126°13′07″W

Geography
- Location: British Columbia, Canada
- District: Range 2 Coast Land District
- Parent range: Pacific Ranges
- Topo map: NTS 92M8 Catto Creek

Geology
- Rock type: Volcanic rock

Mount Ardern is a mountain in Range 2 Coast Land District of British Columbia, Canada. It is located southwest of Silverthrone Mountain and east of the Kingcome Glacier at the head the Kingcome River. Like Mount Squire a short distance to the northwest, Mount Ardern consists of loose volcanic rock. It has an elevation of 2,360 m (7,740 ft), making Mount Ardern 20 m (66 ft) lower than Mount Squire. The name of the mountain was adopted on the National Topographic System map 92M on March 28, 1967.

Mount Ardern is named after James Charles Ardern, a Canadian Army lance corporal from New Westminster who was killed in action on October 3, 1944, while serving with the South Saskatchewan Regiment during World War II. Ardern is buried in the Bergen-Op-Zoom Canadian War Cemetery in North Brabant of the Netherlands. At the time of his death, Ardern was survived by his parents James Charles and Gertrude Ardern.

== See also ==
- Silverthrone Caldera
- Silverthrone Group
