= Selman Creek =

Tribuatary stream in the country of Canada

- Mouth of Selman Creek

Location
- Country: Canada
- Province: British Columbia
- District: Range 2 Coast Land District

Physical characteristics
- Source: Pacific Ranges
  - location: Coast Mountains
  - coordinates: 51°28′35″N 126°25′34″W
  - elevation: 1,285 m (4,216 ft)
- Mouth: Machmell River
  - coordinates: 51°32′43″N 126°21′2″W
  - elevation: 635 m (2,083 ft)
- Length: 13 km (8.1 mi)

Basin features
- Topo map: NTS 92M9 Machmell River

Selman Creek is a tributary of Pashleth Creek in the Machmell River watershed in central coast part of the province of British Columbia, Canada. It flows generally north for roughly 13 km (8.1 mi) to join Pashleth Creek. The mouth of Selman Creek is located about 95 km (59 mi) south of Bella Coola, about 185 km (115 mi) north of Campbell River, and about 342 km (213 mi) northwest of Vancouver.

Selman Creek is in the traditional territory of Wuikinuxv people. As of 2025, the Wuikinuxv Nation is in stage 5 of treaty negotiations with the Province of British Columbia for lands including the entire Machmell River watershed.

== Geography ==
Selman Creek originates from glaciers on high peaks southwest of Silverthrone Mountain near the Ha-Iltzuk Icefield. Its source is just north of the source of the Wakeman River, which lies in the Catto Creek Conservancy just south of the Machmell–Wakeman watershed divide. Selman Creek flows north through Selman Lake. After Selman Lake the creek flows northeast and north to Pashleth Creek passing east of Mount Tran. In turn Pashleth Creek joins the Machmell River, which flows west to Owikeno Lake which drains into the fjord Rivers Inlet via the short Wannock River.

== Geology ==
Selman Creek flows from the inferred northern boundary of the Silverthrone Caldera, a 20 km (12 mi) wide volcanic structure whose older lava and pyroclastic deposits have been deeply dissected by erosion. The creek flows over basaltic andesite that issued from a cluster of vents at the northern end of the caldera. The basaltic andesite is part of a 25 km (16 mi) long lava flow that postdates the current topography. It travelled northwest through Pashleth Creek valley into the Machmell River and is one of the youngest volcanic features of the Silverthrone Caldera.

== See also ==
- List of rivers of British Columbia
