= Charnaud Creek =

Tribuatary stream in the country of Canada

- Mouth of Charnaud Creek

Location
- Country: Canada
- Province: British Columbia
- District: Range 2 Coast Land District

Physical characteristics
- Source: Pacific Ranges
  - location: Coast Mountains
  - coordinates: 51°22′24″N 126°8′45″W
  - elevation: 1,495 m (4,905 ft)
- Mouth: Kingcome River
  - coordinates: 51°18′40″N 126°12′37″W
  - elevation: 207 m (679 ft)
- Length: 11 km (6.8 mi)

Basin features
- Topo map: NTS 92M8 Catto Creek

Charnaud Creek is a tributary of the Kingcome River in central coast region of the province of British Columbia, Canada. It flows generally south and southwest for roughly 11 km (6.8 mi) to join the upper Kingcome River. The mouth of Charnaud Creek is located about 124 km (77 mi) south of Bella Coola, about 157 km (98 mi) north of Campbell River, and about 317 km (197 mi) northwest of Vancouver.

Charnaud Creek is in the traditional territory of the Kwakwakaʼwakw Dzawada̱'enux̱w First Nation.

The creek's name commemorates Lawrence Edward Charnaud, a Royal Canadian Air Force officer who was killed in 1943 during World War II.

== Geography ==
Charnaud Creek originates from glaciers of the Ha-Iltzuk Icefield on high peaks south of Silverthrone Mountain. From its source Charnaud Creek flows south and west to the upper Kingcome River. In turn the Kingcome River flows south to empty into the head of the fjord Kingcome Inlet.

== Geology ==
At the head of Charnaud Creek is a valley-filling basaltic andesite lava flow originating under glacial ice near the southeastern boundary of the Silverthrone Caldera. It postdates the current topography and is considered to be Holocene in age. The lava flow is in the form of an eroded volcanic outcrop.

== See also ==
- List of rivers of British Columbia
