= Trudel Creek =

Tribuatary stream in the country of Canada

- Mouth of Trudel Creek

Location
- Country: Canada
- Province: British Columbia
- District: Range 2 Coast Land District

Physical characteristics
- Source: Trudel Glacier
  - location: Pacific Ranges
  - coordinates: 51°23′41″N 126°11′42″W
  - elevation: 1,155 m (3,789 ft)
- Mouth: Kingcome River
  - coordinates: 51°22′3″N 126°14′57″W
  - elevation: 415 m (1,362 ft)
- Length: 6 km (3.7 mi)

Basin features
- Topo map: NTS 92M8 Catto Creek

Trudel Creek is a tributary of the Kingcome River in the Central Coast region of the province of British Columbia, Canada. It flows generally southwest for roughly 6 km (3.7 mi) to join the upper Kingcome River. The mouth of Trudel Creek is located about 163 km (101 mi) north of Campbell River, and about 320 km (200 mi) northwest of Vancouver.

Trudel Creek is in the traditional territory of the Kwakwakaʼwakw Dzawada̱'enux̱w First Nation.

== Geography ==
Trudel Creek originates as meltwater from Trudel Glacier in the high peaks of the Pacific Ranges of the southern Coast Mountains. From its origin just south of Mount Ardern, Mount Squire, and Mount Kinch, Trudel Creek flows southwest to join the Kingcome River. In turn the Kingcome River flows south to empty into the fjord Kingcome Inlet.

== Geology ==
Trudel Creek flows along the inferred southeastern boundary of the Silverthrone Caldera, a 20 km (12 mi) wide volcanic structure formed by subsidence of the land surface. At the mouth of Trudel Creek is a basaltic andesite lava flow that originated inside the southern part of the Silverthrone Caldera. It is considered to be Holocene in age and is in the form of an eroded volcanic outcrop.

== See also ==
- List of rivers of British Columbia
