= Silverthrone =

Silverthrone can refer to one of the following:

- Mount Silverthrone (Alaska)
- Silverthrone Caldera (British Columbia)
- Silverthrone Glacier (British Columbia)
- Silverthrone Group (British Columbia)
- Silverthrone Mountain (British Columbia)
