= Fang Peak =

Mountain in Canada

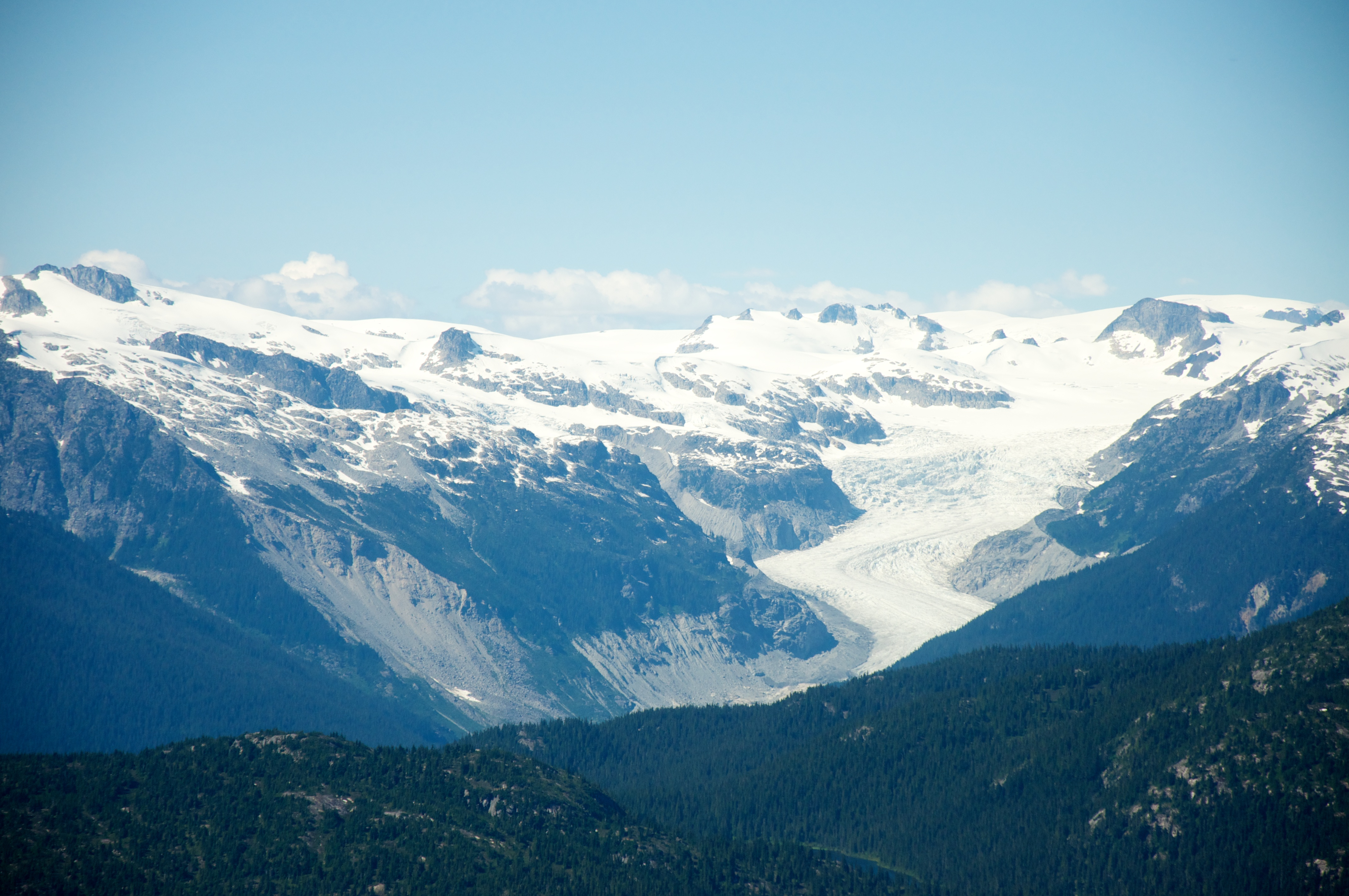

Highest point
- Elevation: 2,302 m (7,552 ft)
- Prominence: 312 m (1,024 ft)
- Coordinates: 51°27′51.8″N 125°59′12.8″W

Geography
- Location within British Columbia
- Location: British Columbia, Canada
- District: Range 2 Coast Land District
- Parent range: Pacific Ranges
- Topo map: NTS 92N5 Klinaklini Glacier

Fang Peak is a mountain in southwestern British Columbia, Canada, located 91 km (57 mi) east of Rivers Inlet and 8 km (5 mi) southeast of Mount Fitzgerald.

== See also ==
- Silverthrone Group
