= Clear River (British Columbia) =

River in Central Coast, British Columbia, Canada

Coordinates: 51°04′18″N 126°10′23″W

The Clear River is a river in the Central Coast region of British Columbia, Canada, flowing east out of the Pacific Ranges of the Coast Mountains into the Kingcome River, of which it is a tributary. Other tributaries of the Kingcome are the Atlatzi and the Satsalla.

== See also ==
- List of rivers of British Columbia
- Clear River (disambiguation)
