= Klinaklini Canyon =

Coordinates: 51°22′00″N 125°40′00″W

Klinaklini Canyon is a canyon on the Klinaklini River in the Pacific Ranges of the Coast Mountains in British Columbia, Canada, located to the north of the head of Knight Inlet in the river's lowermost reaches, upstream from the confluence of the West Klinaklini River.
