= Pashleth Creek =

Tribuatary stream in the country of Canada

- Mouth of Pashleth Creek

Location
- Country: Canada
- Province: British Columbia
- District: Range 2 Coast Land District

Physical characteristics
- Source: Pashleth Glacier
  - location: Pacific Ranges
  - coordinates: 51°31′38″N 126°12′51″W
  - elevation: 910 m (2,990 ft)
- Mouth: Machmell River
  - coordinates: 51°35′48″N 126°26′33″W
  - elevation: 232 m (761 ft)
- Length: 21 km (13 mi)

Basin features
- Topo map: NTS 92M9 Machmell River

Pashleth Creek is a tributary of the Machmell River in central coast part of the province of British Columbia, Canada. It flows generally west and northwest for roughly 21 km (13 mi) to join the Machmell River. The mouth of Pashleth Creek is located about 88 km (55 mi) south of Bella Coola, about 195 km (121 mi) north of Campbell River, and about 348 km (216 mi) northwest of Vancouver.

Pashleth Creek is in the traditional territory of Wuikinuxv people. As of 2025, the Wuikinuxv Nation is in stage 5 of treaty negotiations with the Province of British Columbia for lands including the entire Machmell River watershed.

== Geography ==
Pashleth Creek originates from the meltwater of Pashleth Glacier. It flows west and northwest to the Machmell River, collecting tributary streams, including Selman Creek, mostly flowing from other glaciers in the region.

== Geology ==
A lava flow of basaltic andesite composition travelled through Pashleth Creek valley during the Quaternary and reached the Machmell River. It is more than 25 km (16 mi) long and issued from several vents on the northern side of the 20 km (12 mi) wide Silverthrone Caldera. The lava flow ranges in elevation from 2,000 to 100 m (6,560 to 330 ft) and has undergone only a minimal degree of erosion; it may have been erupted in the last 1,000 years.

== See also ==
- List of rivers of British Columbia
