= Satsalla River =

River in the Coast Mountains, British Columbia, Canada

Coordinates: 51°08′29″N 126°08′07″W

The Satsalla River is a river in the Pacific Ranges of the Coast Mountains in British Columbia, Canada, flowing southwest into the Kingcome River. Like the Atlatzi River, another major tributary of the Kingcome further south, its origins are on the edge of the Ha-Iltzuk Icefield.

== See also ==
- List of rivers of British Columbia
