= Monarch Icefield =

Ice field in British Columbia, Canada

Coordinates: 51°57′00″N 126°02′00″W

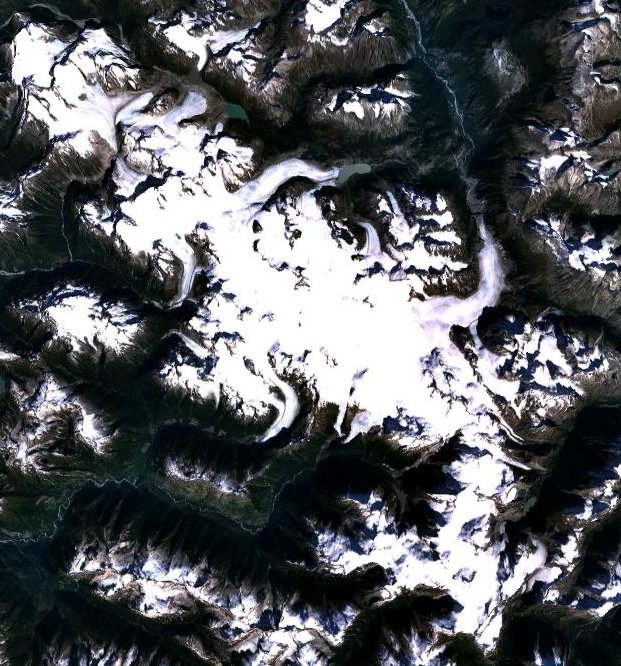
Satellite image of the Monarch Icefield

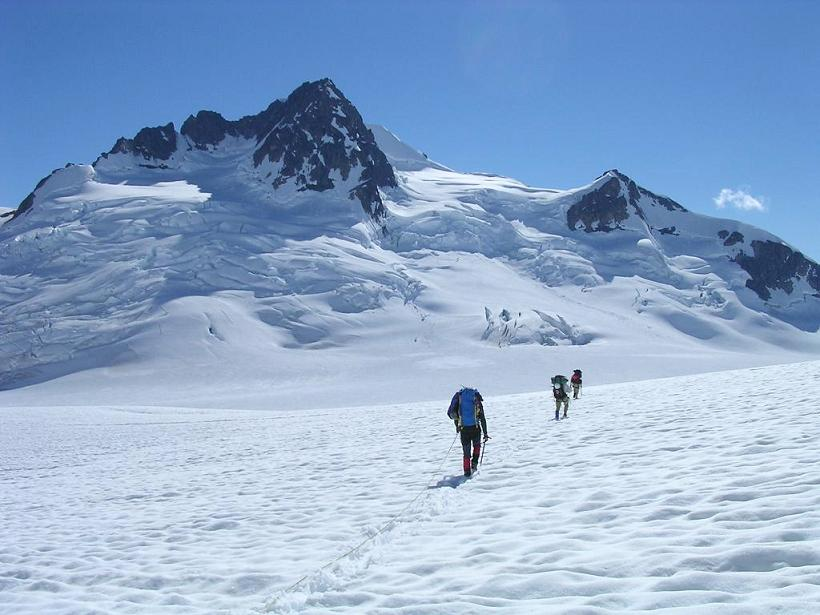
Near Princess Mountain on the Monarch Icefield.

The Monarch Icefield is the northernmost of a series of large continental icecaps studding the heights of the Pacific Ranges of the Coast Mountains in southern British Columbia, Canada. Located southeast of the town of Bella Coola and west of the headwaters of the Atnarko River, a tributary of the Bella Coola River, it lies to the north of the Ha-Iltzuk Icefield, which is the largest icefield of the group and home to the Silverthrone volcano. The Monarch Icefield is very remote and is rarely visited by mountaineering parties.
