= Wakeman =

Wakeman may refer to:

== Places ==
- Wakeman, Ohio, United States
- The Wakeman School and Arts College, a secondary school in Shrewsbury, UK
- Wakeman Sound, a sound on the coast of British Columbia, Canada
- Wakeman River, a river flowing south into the head of Wakeman Sound

== Other uses ==
- Wakeman (surname)
- In the city of Ripon, England, the wakeman presided over a nightly curfew. Relics of this tradition still exist.
