= Mount Overill =

Mountain in British Columbia, Canada

- Location within British Columbia

Highest point
- Elevation: 2,354 m (7,723 ft)
- Prominence: 89 m (292 ft)
- Listing: List of volcanoes in Canada List of Cascade volcanoes
- Coordinates: 51°28′36.8″N 126°07′50.9″W

Geography
- Location: British Columbia, Canada
- District: Range 2 Coast Land District
- Parent range: Pacific Ranges
- Topo map: NTS 92M8 Catto Creek

Geology
- Volcanic arc: Cascade Volcanic Arc
- Volcanic belt: Pemberton Volcanic Belt

Mount Overill is a volcanic peak in southwestern British Columbia, Canada, located 81 km (50 mi) east of Rivers Inlet and 2 km (1 mi) northwest of Mount Somolenko.

== See also ==
- List of volcanoes in Canada
- Volcanism of Canada
- Volcanism of Western Canada
