= Kleena Kleene =

- Location of Kleena Kleene in British Columbia Kleena Kleene (Canada)
- Coordinates: 51°56′46″N 124°52′18″W
- Country: Canada
- Province: British Columbia
- Area codes: 250, 778, 236, 672

Kleena Kleene /ˌkliːnə ˈkliːn, ˌkliːnə ˈkliːni/ is an unincorporated settlement and recreational community on the western end of the Chilcotin Plateau, west of Tatla Lake and northeast of One-Eye Lake. It lies in the upper reaches of the basin of the Klinaklini River, for which it is named, and which penetrates the Pacific Ranges of the Coast Mountains to enter the sea at the head of the Knight Inlet. The community is recreational in nature and like nearby Nimpo Lake it is a base for sightseeing to Hunlen Falls, Klinaklini Falls and Chilko Lake, and for fly-outs to fishing on the area's many small plateau and alpine lakes.

== Climate ==
Kleena Kleene is one of the driest locations in British Columbia because of the rain shadow effect of Coast Mountains located directly to the west. The temperature is cooler than the other similarly dry locations in the province.

Climate data for Kleena Kleene (1981–2010)
Month	Jan	Feb	Mar	Apr	May	Jun	Jul	Aug	Sep	Oct	Nov	Dec	Year
Record high °C (°F)	12.5 (54.5)	13.0 (55.4)	20.0 (68.0)	25.0 (77.0)	37.0 (98.6)	32.5 (90.5)	35.0 (95.0)	35.5 (95.9)	34.0 (93.2)	29.5 (85.1)	16.5 (61.7)	17.5 (63.5)	37 (99)
Mean daily maximum °C (°F)	−3.1 (26.4)	1.8 (35.2)	6.7 (44.1)	11.5 (52.7)	15.9 (60.6)	19.3 (66.7)	22.4 (72.3)	22.6 (72.7)	18.5 (65.3)	11.0 (51.8)	1.4 (34.5)	−4.3 (24.3)	10.3 (50.5)
Daily mean °C (°F)	−8.8 (16.2)	−5.5 (22.1)	−0.7 (30.7)	3.9 (39.0)	8.1 (46.6)	11.7 (53.1)	14.2 (57.6)	13.7 (56.7)	9.8 (49.6)	4.1 (39.4)	−3.5 (25.7)	−9.6 (14.7)	3.1 (37.6)
Mean daily minimum °C (°F)	−14.3 (6.3)	−12.7 (9.1)	−8.0 (17.6)	−3.7 (25.3)	0.4 (32.7)	4.1 (39.4)	6.0 (42.8)	4.9 (40.8)	1.1 (34.0)	−2.9 (26.8)	−8.4 (16.9)	−14.8 (5.4)	−4.0 (24.8)
Record low °C (°F)	−42.0 (−43.6)	−37.5 (−35.5)	−36.0 (−32.8)	−17.0 (1.4)	−10.0 (14.0)	−5.0 (23.0)	−2.5 (27.5)	−5.0 (23.0)	−10.0 (14.0)	−29.5 (−21.1)	−44.0 (−47.2)	−43.0 (−45.4)	−44.0 (−47.2)
Average precipitation mm (inches)	30.8 (1.21)	14.6 (0.57)	10.6 (0.42)	13.0 (0.51)	24.5 (0.96)	35.0 (1.38)	33.9 (1.33)	27.4 (1.08)	22.2 (0.87)	33.5 (1.32)	41.9 (1.65)	31.4 (1.24)	318.6 (12.54)
Average rainfall mm (inches)	7.3 (0.29)	2.5 (0.10)	2.6 (0.10)	7.7 (0.30)	24.0 (0.94)	35.0 (1.38)	33.9 (1.33)	27.4 (1.08)	21.9 (0.86)	27.8 (1.09)	11.4 (0.45)	3.4 (0.13)	204.7 (8.06)
Average snowfall cm (inches)	23.5 (9.3)	12.2 (4.8)	8.0 (3.1)	5.3 (2.1)	0.5 (0.2)	0 (0)	0 (0)	0 (0)	0.2 (0.1)	5.7 (2.2)	30.5 (12.0)	28.0 (11.0)	113.8 (44.8)
Source: Environment Canada
