= Neechantz River =

Coordinates: 51°38′45″N 126°41′13″W

The Neechantz River is a river in the Central Coast region of British Columbia, Canada, flowing north out of the Pacific Ranges into the Machmell River just before its mouth into the head of Owikeno Lake.

== See also ==
- List of rivers of British Columbia
