= Pantheon Range =

Mountain range in British Columbia, Canada

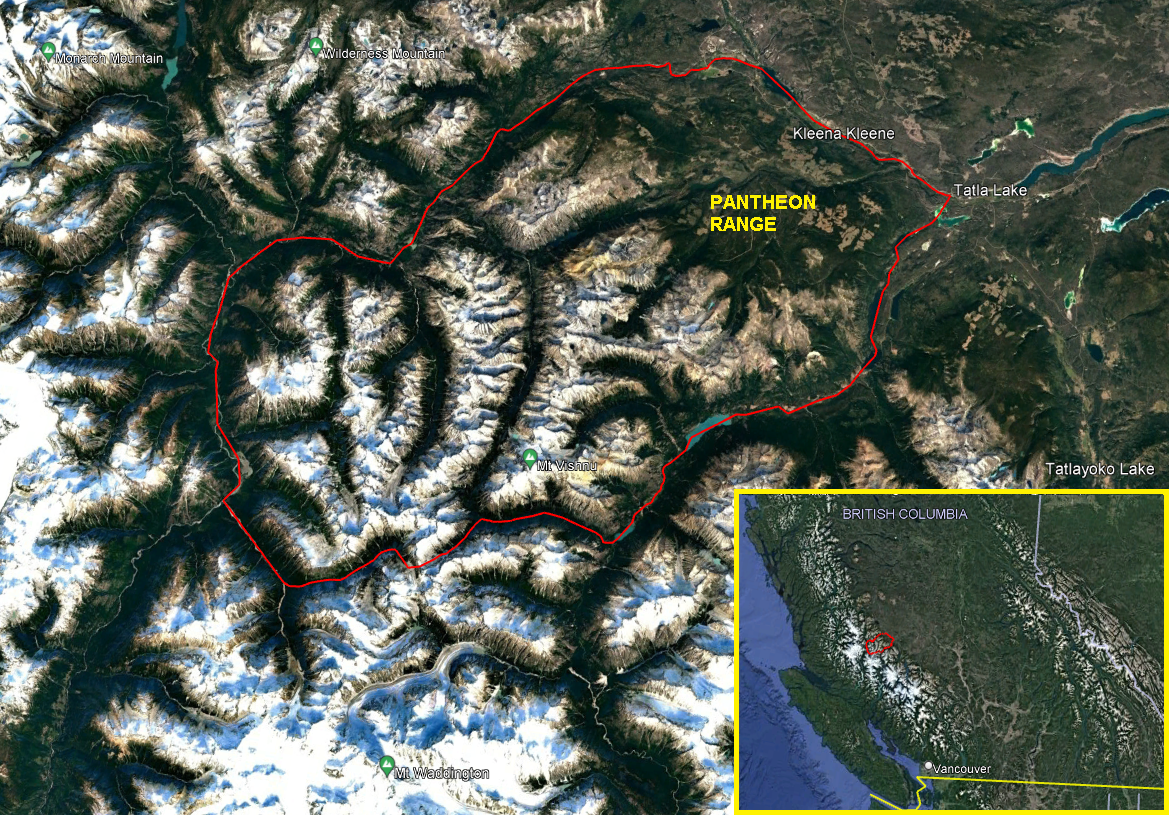

Highest point
- Peak: Mount Vishnu
- Elevation: 3,008 m (9,869 ft)
- Coordinates: 51°37′29.0″N 125°09′07.0″W

Dimensions
- Area: 1,930 km^{2} (750 mi^{2})

Geography
- Country: Canada
- Province: British Columbia
- Parent range: Pacific Ranges

The Pantheon Range is a subrange of the Pacific Ranges of the Coast Mountains in British Columbia. It is located between the edge of the Chilcotin Plateau at Tatla Lake on its northeast and the Klinaklini River on its west, with a southeastern boundary along Mosley Creek, a major tributary of the Homathko River. The range is 5,550 km^{2} (2,140 sq mi) in area and extremely rugged, with many sharp, glaciated peaks.

As is shown in the Canadian Mountain Encyclopedia map, the Pantheon Range is north of the Waddington and Niut Ranges, which corresponds with the official 1:50,000 maps.

The range's highest summits are Mount Vishnu 3,008 m (9,869 ft), Mount Astarte 2,959 m (9,708 ft) and Mount Zeus 2,982 m (9,783 ft). Most of the range's peaks have names of gods or other deities, e.g. Thoth, Hermes, Polyphemus, etc. - hence the name.

Immediately south of the Pantheon Range is the much higher Waddington Range, home to the highest peak in the Coast Mountains, Mount Waddington, and to the south of that is the Whitemantle Range. Southeast across Mosley Creek, the main west fork of the Homathko River, is the Niut Range, while south of it across the Homathko River is the Homathko Icefield and its attendant ranges.

West across the Klinaklini River is the Ha-Iltzuk Icefield, which is the largest of the coastal icecaps of the southern Coast Mountains, larger than the Waddington Range's complex of glaciers and peaks or the Homathko Icefield. North of the Pantheon Range is the northwestern end of the Chilcotin Ranges while farther north, beyond the head of the Klinaklini, is the Rainbow Range, which lies on the Chilcotin Plateau.
