= Washwash River =

River in the Central Coast, British Columbia, Canada

Coordinates: 51°51′16″N 126°39′54″W

The Washwash River is a river in the Central Coast region of British Columbia, Canada, flowing generally west out of the Pacific Ranges into the Tzeo River just above the Tzeo's mouth into the head of Owikeno Lake.

== General information ==
- Topography Feature Category: River
- Geographical Feature: River
- Canadian Province/Territory: British Columbia
- Elevation: 909 meters
- Location: Coast Land District

== See also ==
- List of rivers of British Columbia
