= Klinaklini River =

- Mouth of Klinaklini River
- Etymology: Kwak'wala word for eulachon grease
- Native name: T̓linat̓łina, ƛ̓inaƛ̓ina (Kwak'wala); Jinadlin (Chilcotin)

Location
- Country: Canada
- Province: British Columbia
- District: Range 2 Coast Land District

Physical characteristics
- Source: Unnamed lake
  - location: Coast Mountains
  - coordinates: 51°45′3″N 125°5′51″W
  - elevation: 2,130 m (6,990 ft)
- Mouth: Pacific Ocean
  - location: Knight Inlet, Coast Mountains
  - coordinates: 51°5′32″N 125°37′34″W
  - elevation: 0 m (0 ft)
- Basin size: 5,780 km^{2} (2,230 sq mi)
- Discharge
  - location: mouth
  - average: 299 m^{3}/s (10,600 cu ft/s)
  - minimum: 38 m^{3}/s (1,300 cu ft/s)
  - maximum: 3,260 m^{3}/s (115,000 cu ft/s)

The Klinaklini River /ˌkliːnəˈkliːni/ (Kwak'wala name T̓linat̓łina also spelled ƛ̓inaƛ̓ina) is one of the major rivers of the Pacific Ranges section of the Coast Mountains in the Canadian province of British Columbia. It originates in the Pantheon Range and empties into the head of Knight Inlet.

A different spelling of Klinaklini is Kleena Kleene, which is the name of a recreational community on the river just below its exit from the Pantheon Range onto the Chilcotin Plateau. In the area of Kleena Kleene the Klinaklini, Homathko and Chilanko River basins share the same stretch of plateau.

The names Kleena Kleene and Klinaklini derive from the Kwak'wala word for eulachon grease, which is made from the eulachon, a small oily fish that ascend coastal rivers.

There is a First Nation village of the Tanakteuk subdivision of the Kwakwaka'wakw peoples at the mouth of the river, Tsawatti. Located on the Indian Reserve of the same name, it is the primary eulachon fishing and preservation site of the Kwakwaka'wakw peoples and as such is open for use by other subdivisions of the Kwakwaka'wakw.

== Course ==
The Klinaklini River originates in small, unnamed lakes on the eastern slopes of Hellraving Peak, in the northern Pantheon Range, north of Mount Vishnu and Mount Waddington, and south of Perkins Peak.

From its source the Klinaklini River flows northeast to the Chilcotin Plateau, where it turns suddenly northwest. Its path is followed by British Columbia Highway 20. The river flows by the community of Kleena Kleene before entering One Eye Lake. Below the lake the Klinaklini turns west, while Highway 20 continues north along McClinchy Creek, a tributary of the Klinaklini. The river flows generally south and west through the Pantheon Range, collecting numerous tributary streams. Below Colwell Creek the river briefly widens into Klinaklini Lake.

As the Klinaklini turns more directly south it is joined from the northwest by the North Klinaklini River, which is formed by the meltwaters of many glaciers. It flows by heavily glaciated mountains with names like Monarch Mountain, The Queen, The Pretender, The Throne, The Serf, and Concubine Peaks. Knot Lakes, tributary to the North Klinaklini River, extend north into Tweedsmuir South Provincial Park.

After its confluence with the North Klinaklini River the main Klinaklini flows south along the western side of the Pantheon and Waddington Ranges. Along the way it is contained in Klinaklini Canyon. Below Klinaklini Canyon the river is joined by the brief but voluminous West Klinaklini River (7 km only) joins the Klinaklini. The West Klinaklini is the meltwater from Klinaklini Glacier, the main tongue of the vast Ha-Iltzuk Icefield (Silverthrone Glacier), which lies west of the Klinaklini. Tumult Creek, a tributary of the West Klinaklini River, flows from Tumult Glacier.

Below the West Klinaklini confluence the Klinaklini River flows south through a relatively wide valley to its mouth at the head of Knight Inlet, just west of the mouth of the Franklin River.

== Tributaries ==
This is an incomplete list of tributaries listed in upstream order.

- Devereux Creek
- Dice Creek
- West Klinaklini River
  - Tumult Creek
- Hoodoo Creek
- Dorothy Creek
- Frontier Creek
- North Klinaklini River
  - Knot Creek
    - Knot Lakes
- Jobin Creek
- Colwell Creek
- Bussel Creek
- Ba'tiste Dester Creek
- Big Stick Creek
  - Big Stick Lake
- McClinchy Creek
- Chromiun Creek

== See also ==
- List of rivers of British Columbia
- Silverthrone Caldera
- Silverthrone Mountain
