= Mount Somolenko =

Mountain in British Columbia, Canada

- Location within British Columbia

Highest point
- Elevation: 2,658 m (8,720 ft)
- Prominence: 493 m (1,617 ft)
- Listing: List of volcanoes in Canada List of Cascade volcanoes
- Coordinates: 51°28′09.8″N 126°06′10.1″W

Geography
- Location: British Columbia, Canada
- District: Range 2 Coast Land District
- Parent range: Pacific Ranges
- Topo map: NTS 92M8 Catto Creek

Geology
- Volcanic arc: Cascade Volcanic Arc
- Volcanic belt: Pemberton Volcanic Belt

Mount Somolenko is a volcanic peak in southwestern British Columbia, Canada, located 83 km (52 mi) east of Rivers Inlet and 7 km (4 mi) south of Silverthrone Mountain. It is the highest peak south of Mount Silverthrone in the Ha-Iltzuk Icefield.

== History ==
The name of the mountain was adopted on the National Topographic System map 92M on March 28, 1967. It is named after Nicholas Somolenko, a World War II aircraftman of the Royal Canadian Air Force who was killed when his aircraft was shot down over Europe on June 7, 1944.

Somolenko was born to John and Ephresinia Somolenko in New Westminster. His name is inscribed on the Air Forces Memorial in Surrey, United Kingdom, and like many others inscribed on this memorial, he has no known grave.

== See also ==
- Silverthrone Group
