= Inziana River =

Coordinates: 51°49′50″N 126°40′55″W

The Inziana River is a river in the Central Coast region of British Columbia, Canada, flowing east out of the Pacific Ranges into the head of Owikeno Lake.

== See also ==
- List of rivers of British Columbia
