= Mount Fitzgerald =

Mount Fitzgerald is the name for several mountains and places including:

- Mount Fitzgerald (British Columbia) in British Columbia, Canada
- Mount Fitzgerald (Yukon) in Yukon, Canada
- Mount Fitzgerald (Christchurch), Christchurch, New Zealand
- Mount Fitzgerald (Nevada) in Nevada, USA
- Mount Fitzgerald Reserve, Pigeon Bay, Christchurch
