= West Klinaklini River =

River in Canada

Coordinates: 51°16′00″N 125°42′00″W

The West Klinaklini River is a short but voluminous tributary of the Klinaklini River in British Columbia, Canada, joining it in its lower reaches above its mouth into Knight Inlet. Only 7 km long, it is formed by the meltwater from the Klinaklini Glacier, the main tongue of the vast Ha-Iltzuk Icefield, which lies west of the Klinaklini River.

== See also ==
- List of rivers of British Columbia
