= Mount Fitzgerald (British Columbia) =

Mountain in British Columbia, Canada

- Location within British Columbia
- Interactive map of Mount Calli

Highest point
- Elevation: 2,641 m (8,665 ft)
- Prominence: 336 m (1,102 ft)
- Coordinates: 51°31′01.9″N 126°03′56.2″W

Geography
- Location: British Columbia, Canada
- Parent range: Pacific Ranges
- Topo map: NTS 92M9 Machmell River

Geology
- Rock type: Granite

Mount Fitzgerald is a mountain in southwestern British Columbia, Canada, located 84 km (52 mi) east of Rivers Inlet and 4 km (2 mi) east of Silverthrone Mountain.

== See also ==
- Silverthrone Group
