= Tzeo River =

Coordinates: 51°50′39″N 126°40′03″W

The Tzeo River is a river in the Central Coast region of British Columbia, Canada, flowing generally south out of the Pacific Ranges into the head of Owikeno Lake.

== See also ==
- List of rivers of British Columbia
