= Silverthrone Glacier =

Glacier in British Columbia, Canada

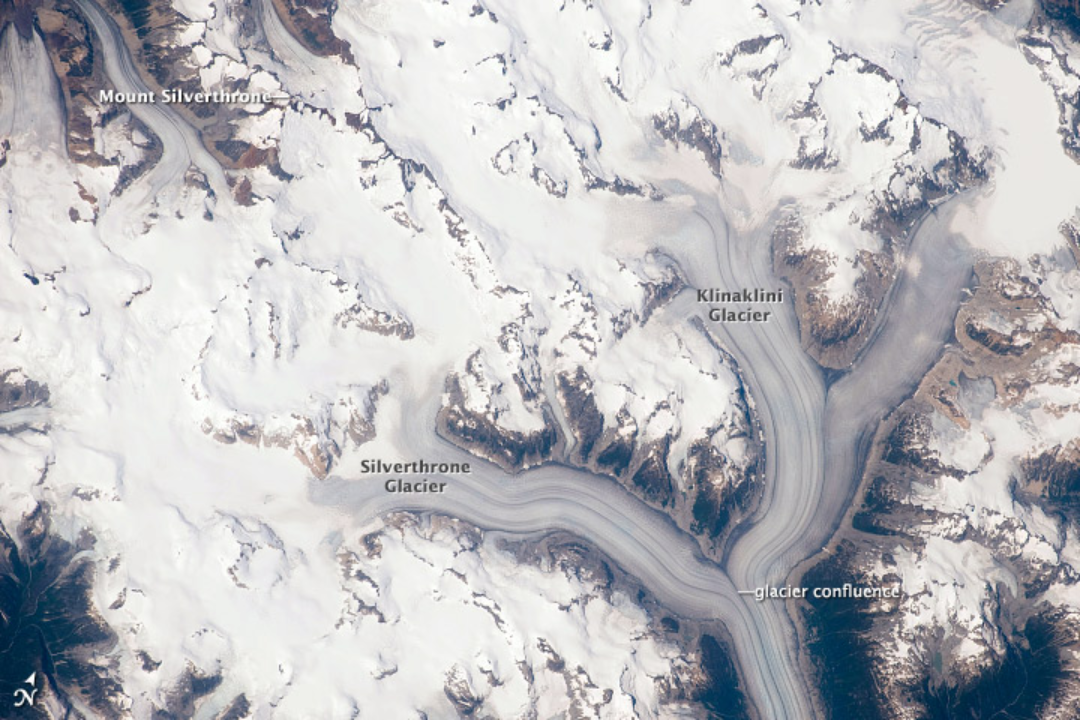
- Satellite image of the Klinaklini and Silverthrone glaciers

- Location within British Columbia
- Interactive map of Silverthrone Glacier
- Location: Ha-Iltzuk Icefield
- Coordinates: 51°26′N 125°53′W

The Silverthrone Glacier is a glacier in the southern Coast Mountains of British Columbia, Canada. It is one of two large valley glaciers at the head of Knight Inlet, the other being the Klinaklini Glacier. Both glaciers drain the approximately 3,600 km^{2} (1,400 mi^{2}) Ha-Iltzuk Icefield and converge before flowing south towards Knight Inlet.

The Silverthrone Glacier shares its name with Silverthrone Mountain and the Silverthrone Caldera, both of which are volcanic features that have formed in the last one million years.
