= Pashleth Glacier =

Glacier in British Columbia, Canada

Coordinates: 51°31′48″N 126°13′00″W

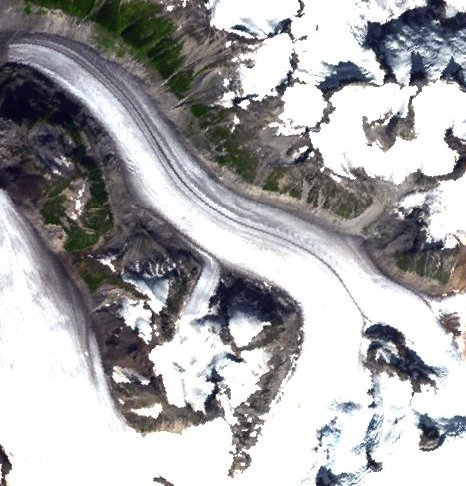
Satellite image of the Pashleth Glacier

The Pashleth Glacier is a glacier south of the Machmell River and west of the Klinaklini Glacier in southwestern British Columbia, Canada.
