= Atlatzi River =

River in the Pacific Ranges, British Columbia, Canada

The Atlatzi River is a river in the Pacific Ranges in the Central Coast region of British Columbia, Canada, flowing southwest into the lower Kingcome River, which feeds the head of Kingcome Inlet. It had been called Back River on a 1919 map of British Columbia. Its headwaters are at 51°03′N 125°52′W.

== See also ==
- List of rivers of British Columbia
