= Wakeman (surname) =

Wakeman is a surname. Notable people with the surname include:

- Adam Wakeman (born 1974), musician, son of Rick Wakeman
- Alan Wakeman (born 1947), musician
- Alan Wakeman (author) (1936-2015), British author and gay rights activist
- Frederic Wakeman (1937-2006), American historian
- Frederic Wakeman, Sr., (1908-1998), American novelist
- Sir George Wakeman (died 1688), English doctor, royal physician to Catherine of Braganza
- John Wakeman (died 1549), English Benedictine, the last Abbot of Tewkesbury and first Bishop of Gloucester
- Oliver Wakeman (born 1972), musician, son of Rick Wakeman
- Rick Wakeman (born 1949), musician
- Rodney Wakeman (born 1966), American politician
- Shannon Wakeman (born 1990), International rugby player
- Wowinape, Thomas Wakeman (1846 – 1886), organizaed the first Oceti Sakowin YMCA
- William Frederick Wakeman (1822 – 1900), Irish archaeologist

Fictional characters:

- Jenny Wakeman, female robot from animated series My Life as a Teenage Robot
