= Sheemahant River =

Coordinates: 51°44′24″N 126°37′19″W

The Sheemahant River is a river in the Central Coast region of British Columbia, Canada, flowing generally west out of the Pacific Ranges into the head of Owikeno Lake.

== See also ==
- List of rivers of British Columbia
