= Wakeman River =

River in British Columbia, Canada

Coordinates: 51°02′16″N 126°31′05″W

The Wakeman River is a river in the western Pacific Ranges on the Central Coast region of British Columbia, Canada, flowing south into Wakeman Sound, which is a sidewater of Kingcome Inlet.

Alalco Indian Reserve No. 8 is at the mouth of the river, on its west shore. To its south, on the shore of Wakeman Sound, is Dug-da-myse Indian Reserve No. 12, and to the south of that is another Indian reserve, Kyidagwis Indian Reserve No. 2.

== Name origin ==
Like Wakeman Sound, the river was named by Captain Pender for William Plowden Wakeman, a clear at the Esquimalt Royal Navy Dockyard from 1866 to 1872. Wakeman had arrived from England on the SS Tynemouth on September 17, 1862, and died in the naval hospital at Esquimalt in 1872.

== See also ==
- List of rivers of British Columbia
- Wakeman (disambiguation)
