= Wakeman Sound =

Sound in British Columbia

Wakeman Sound is a sound on the South Coast of British Columbia, Canada, located in the area north of the Broughton Archipelago, which lies on the north side of Queen Charlotte Strait, on the northeast side of Broughton Island. It is a sidewater opening of and opening north off Kingcome Inlet.

It is the traditional home of the Haxwa'mis, who are a part of the Kwakwakaʼwakw. The Haxwa'mis people amalgamated with the Kwikwasut'inuxw and are known as the Ḵwiḵwa̱sut'inux̱w Ha̱xwa'mis First Nation.

== Indian reserves and villages ==
Alalco Indian Reserve No. 8 is at the mouth of the Wakeman River into Wakeman Sound, on its west shore (51°04′00″N 126°32′00″W), which is on the site of Okwialis, a former village of the Haxwa'mis, also spelled huxwiay'lis and Atlalko (51°02′30″N 126°32′00″W ). To the south, on the shore of Wakeman Sound, is Dug-da-myse Indian Reserve No. 12, (51°02′00″N 126°31′00″W), and to the south of that is another Indian reserve, Kyidagwis Indian Reserve No. 2 (51°01′00″N 126°33′00″W).

== Surrounding terrain ==
Mount Benedict is located on the east side of the sound (51°02′37″N 126°28′45″W) while Perpendicular Mountain is located immediately northwest of the head of the sound (51°03′57″N 126°33′51″W). Mount Beckford is located on the west side of the sound near its opening (50°58′29″N 126°33′40″W). Southeast of it is Elizabeth Cone (50°57′38″N 126°31′47″W). In between those two is Mount Pasmore (50°57′58″N 126°32′50″W). On the other side of the sound, above its entrance, is Mount Plowden (50°58′14″N 126°27′18″W). North of it on the east side of the sound is Mount Walter (50°59′59″N 126°29′26″W).
