= Trudel Glacier =

Glacier in British Columbia, Canada

Coordinates: 51°23′54″N 126°10′48″W

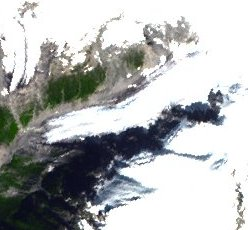
Satellite image of the Trudel Glacier

The Trudel Glacier is a glacier at the head of Trudel Creek in southwestern British Columbia, Canada.
