= Coast Plutonic Complex =

The Coast Plutonic Complex, also referred to as the Coast Crystalline Belt, Coast Range batholith or simply the Coast batholith, is a 1,700 km (1,100 mi) long and 50–175 km (31–109 mi) wide geological feature on the continental margin of western North America. It underlies most of the Coast Belt, which encompasses portions of southwestern Yukon and the coastal regions of British Columbia and southeastern Alaska. The Coast Plutonic Complex consists of plutons, gneiss and migmatite, as well as metamorphosed sedimentary and volcanic rocks of lesser variably. More than 75% of the rocks comprising this northwesterly-trending complex are tonalites, diorites and quartz diorites, whereas at least 75% of it is underlain by rocks of granitic origin. At least 95% of the Coast Plutonic Complex is of Jurassic-to-Eocene age, although younger plutons of Miocene age also occur throughout the complex.

The Coast Plutonic Complex is the product of subduction-related magmatism as evidenced by geochemical data obtained from major, trace and rare-earth elements in plutons and associated volcanic sequences in the southern portion of the complex. It is one of the least felsic batholith-like belts encircling the Pacific Ocean, having a composition similar to that of average continental crust. The Coast Plutonic Complex is also the largest magmatic arc of the North American Cordillera and one of the largest subduction-related plutonic rock assemblages on Earth.
