= British Columbia Mountaineering Club =

Mountaineering organization based in Vancouver, British Columbia

- Abbreviation: BCMC
- Founded: October 28, 1907; 118 years ago
- Type: Non-profit organization
- Location: Vancouver, British Columbia
- Region served: British Columbia
- Formerly called: Vancouver Mountaineering Club

The British Columbia Mountaineering Club (BCMC) is a mountaineering organization, based in Vancouver, British Columbia. Founded on October 28, 1907 as the Vancouver Mountaineering Club, it became one of the centres of Canadian Mountaineering, particularly in the Coast Mountains of British Columbia. Through publication of journals such as The Northern Cordilleran in 1913 and the current bi-annual BC Mountaineer, weekly meetings and trips and a monthly newsletter, the club became a repository and recorder of mountaineering history and culture for the West Coast of Canada. The BCMC Trail on Grouse Mountain is so named as a legacy of the various trails established and maintained by the club on Grouse Mountain over the past century.
