= Kingcome River =

River in British Columbia, Canada

The Kingcome River is a river in the Canadian province of British Columbia. Its drainage basin is 1,456 square kilometres (562 sq mi) in size.

== Course ==
The Kingcome River originates from the Kingcome Glacier and flows generally south into Kingcome Inlet, which lies north of and on the inland side of the Broughton Archipelago. It has two major tributaries, the Atlatzi River joining the Kingcome near its mouth at 51°00′55″N 126°07′08″W, the Satsalla River, which like the Atlatzi flows southwest out of sources on the edge of the Ha-Iltzuk Icefield, meeting the Kingcome at 51°08′29″N 126°08′07″W. Another smaller tributary, the Clear River, flows from the west, meeting the Kingcome at 51°04′18″N 126°10′23″W.

== See also ==
- List of rivers of British Columbia
- Kingcome (disambiguation)
