= Kingcome Glacier =

Glacier in British Columbia, Canada

Coordinates: 51°25′00″N 126°17′00″W

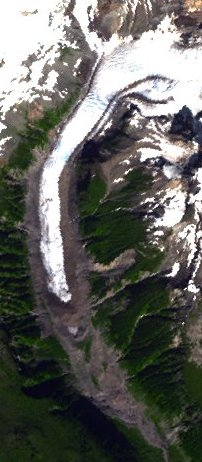
Satellite image of the Kingcome Glacier

The Kingcome Glacier is a glacier located at the head of the Kingcome River in southwestern British Columbia, Canada.

== See also ==
- Kingcome (disambiguation)
