= Owikeno Lake =

Lake in British Columbia, Canada

Wuikinuxv Lake
- Location within British Columbia
- Location: British Columbia
- Coordinates: 51°41′N 126°55′W
- Primary inflows: Tzeo, Inziana, Machmell, and Sheemahant Rivers
- Primary outflows: Wannock River
- Basin countries: Canada

Wuikinuxv Lake, also Owekeeno Lake, Owekano Lake, Oweekayno Lake and other spellings (pron. "o we KEE no"), is a large fjord lake in the Central Coast region of British Columbia, Canada. It connects to the head of Rivers Inlet by the short Wannock River (Wanukv). The lake's name comes from the indigenous people of the region, the Wuikinuxv, whose settlements and territory lie around the lake. Their largest and principal settlement was on an island in the lower reaches of the lake named Katit.

Owikeno Lake is fed by several large rivers, the Tzeo (Ciu), Inziana, Machmell, Sheemahant Rivers. Feeding the Machmell is the Neechantz River, joining the Machmell just above its mouth into the lake. The Washwash River similarly joins the Tzeo just above that river's estuary into the lake.

== See also ==
- List of lakes of British Columbia
