= Silverthrone Mountain =

Mountain in British Columbia, Canada

- Mount Silverthrone
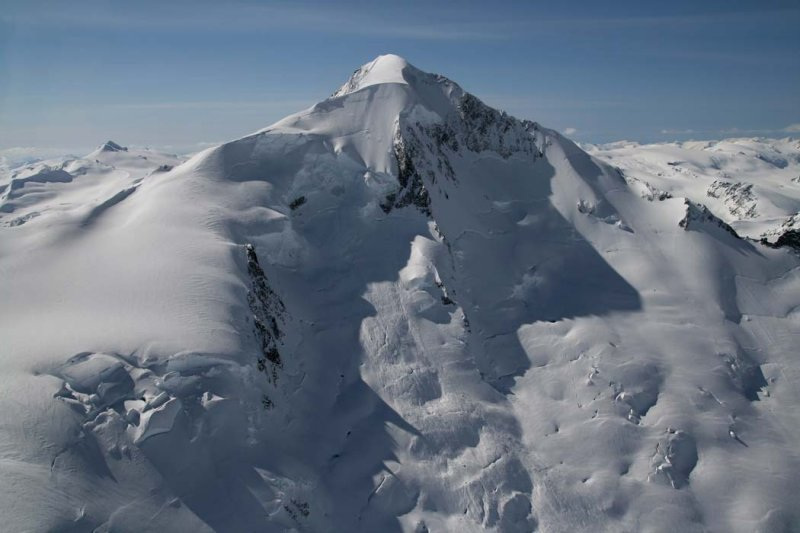
- Northeast face of Silverthrone Mountain

Highest point
- Elevation: 2,864 m (9,396 ft)
- Prominence: 975 m (3,199 ft)
- Listing: Mountains of British Columbia; Canada highest major peak 80th; List of volcanoes in Canada; List of Cascade volcanoes
- Coordinates: 51°31′04″N 126°06′48″W

Geography
- Location within British Columbia
- Interactive map of Silverthrone Mountain
- Location: British Columbia, Canada
- District: Range 2 Coast Land District
- Parent range: Pacific Ranges
- Topo map: NTS 92M9 Machmell River

Geology
- Mountain type: Lava dome
- Volcanic arc: Canadian Cascade Arc
- Volcanic belt: Pemberton/Garibaldi Belt

Climbing
- First ascent: 14 August 1936 Don Munday, Phyllis Munday, Henry Hall, Hans Fuhrer

Silverthrone Mountain, sometimes referred to as Mount Silverthrone, is a mountain in the Pacific Ranges of the Coast Mountains of British Columbia, Canada, located over 320 km (200 mi) northwest of the city of Vancouver and about 50 km (30 mi) west of Mount Waddington, British Columbia, Canada. It is the highest peak in the Ha-Iltzuk Icefield, which is the largest icefield in the Coast Mountains south of the Alaska Panhandle.

== Geology ==
Silverthrone Mountain is an eroded lava dome on the northeast edge of the large Silverthrone Caldera. It lies within the Coast Plutonic Complex, which is the single largest contiguous granite outcropping in the world. The plutonic and metamorphic rocks extend approximately 1,800 kilometers on the coast of British Columbia, southwestern Yukon and southeastern Alaska. In addition, Garibaldi, Meager, Cayley and Silverthrone areas are of recent volcanic origin. The volcanic terrain in the Silverthrone area is very similar to the Mount Meager massif further south. However, it is notably more icy.

Silverthrone Mountain is among the heavily glaciated peaks in southwestern British Columbia. It has a topographic prominence of approximately 975 m (3,200 ft), greater than any other volcano in southwestern British Columbia. Silverthrone contains one of the few calderas buried beneath the ice caps of western Canada.

== Skiing and recreation ==
The first mountaineering visit at Silverthrone Mountain was in 1936 by the widely known pioneering climbing couple Don and Phyllis Munday, accompanied by Henry Hall, by hiking up the Klinaklini Glacier from the head of Knight Inlet. Because Silverthrone is heavily glaciated, Don Munday called the mountain "home of the snows".

Skiing on Silverthrone Mountain includes skiing on the largest ice field in the southern Coast Mountains, the Ha-Iltzuk Icefield. It is skiable over 1,500 m (5,000 ft), possibly over 2,700 m (9,000 ft) down to the Pacific Ocean. The easiest access to Silverthrone Mountain is by air travel, starting from the rural community of Tatla Lake, landing on the major part of the Ha-Iltzuk Icefield. Air travels can also be made into logging camps at Owikeno Lake to the west or at the start of Knight Inlet to the southwest, followed by long hiking and skiing methods.

== See also ==
- Cascade Volcanoes
- Garibaldi Volcanic Belt
- Pemberton Volcanic Belt
- Cascade Range
- Ha-Iltzuk Icefield
- Volcanism of Canada
- Volcanism of Western Canada
