= Bivouac Mountain Encyclopedia =

Organization based in Vancouver, British Columbia

The Canadian Mountain Encyclopedia is an organization based in Vancouver, British Columbia founded in 1995 to provide information on Canada's mountains, backroads and trails. It is aimed at hikers and mountaineers, a similar audience to the Canadian Alpine Journal or a guidebook. The articles are supported by a GIS database and mapping system. The organization maintains a structured database of mountains for all Canada with access trails and backroads. The online reference database has about 30,000 mountains, 4000 backroads and 3000 trails.

The initial core of the website was the mountain, road and trail databases. In 2009, a project was begun to upgrade the road and trail database, taking advantage of the newer air photos currently available via Google Earth. This has resulted in numerous corrections to previous data based on government maps. Roads and trails were classified and color coded according to their current conditions reported by about 7000 road bulletins written by eyewitness users of the roads.

In October 2000, a major project involving about 30 volunteer editors was begun to catalog every Canadian and US mountain. The initial scope was to catalog every peak over 300 meters of topographic prominence. The source of the data in Canada was the 1:50,000 series National Topographic Series maps, and in the United States, the USGS maps. In British Columbia the source was the TRIM data published by British Columbia Basemap. The catalog involved charting and cataloging many peaks without official name. Many of these peaks had "standing names" in the previous authoritative guidebooks such as Climber's Guide to the Rocky Mountains of Canada, first published in 1921, and "A Guide to Climbing and Hiking in Southwestern British Columbia" published in 1986 by Bruce Fairley, and these were adopted by Canadian Mountain Encyclopedia. Previously uncharted peaks were assigned letter codes, geographic names and provisional names. The first phase of the cataloging was completed in 2003 and from then on, a steady trickle of updates were made as errors were reported. In 2012, a major project was begun to systematically recheck every peak, now plotted on the newer mapping systems of the website.
