= Catto Creek =

Tributary stream in the country of Canada

- Mouth of Catto Creek

Location
- Country: Canada
- Province: British Columbia
- District: Range 2 Coast Land District

Physical characteristics
- Source
  - location: Pacific Ranges
  - coordinates: 51°26′38″N 126°21′8″W
  - elevation: 1,415 m (4,642 ft)
- Mouth: Wakeman River
  - coordinates: 51°21′40″N 126°26′3″W
  - elevation: 432 m (1,417 ft)
- Length: 16 km (9.9 mi)

Basin features
- Topo map: NTS 92M8 Catto Creek

Catto Creek is a tributary of the Wakeman River in the Central Coast region of the province of British Columbia, Canada.

It flows generally south and southwest for roughly 16 km (9.9 mi) to join the upper Wakeman River. The mouth of Catto Creek is located about 115 km (71 mi) south of Bella Coola, about 280 km (170 mi) north of Campbell River, and about 430 km (270 mi) northwest of Vancouver.

Catto Creek is in the traditional territory of the Kwakwakaʼwakw Gwaʼsala-ʼNakwaxdaʼxw Nations, Ḵwiḵwa̱sut'inux̱w Ha̱xwa'mis First Nation, and the Dzawada̱'enux̱w First Nation.

== Geography ==
Catto Creek originates in the high peaks and glaciers of the Ha-Iltzuk Icefield in the Pacific Ranges of the southern Coast Mountains. Its source is in the Catto Creek Conservancy protected area. The creek flows south and southwest to the Wakeman River just south of the Catto Creek Conservancy.

== Geology ==
The headwaters of Catto Creek are within the southern portion of the Silverthrone Caldera, a 20 km (12 mi) wide volcanic structure formed by subsidience of the land surface. At the head of the creek is the deeply dissected remains of intracaldera polymict breccia that is overlain by younger lava flows and domes. About 4 km (2.5 mi) southeast of the head of Catto Creek is a basaltic andesite flow near the eastern bank of the creek. From there, Catto Creek flows about 7 km (4.3 mi) southwest to the inferred southwestern boundary of the Silverthrone Caldera.

== See also ==
- List of rivers of British Columbia
