= Knight Inlet =

Inlet on the coast of British Columbia, Canada

- dzawadi (Kwak'wala)
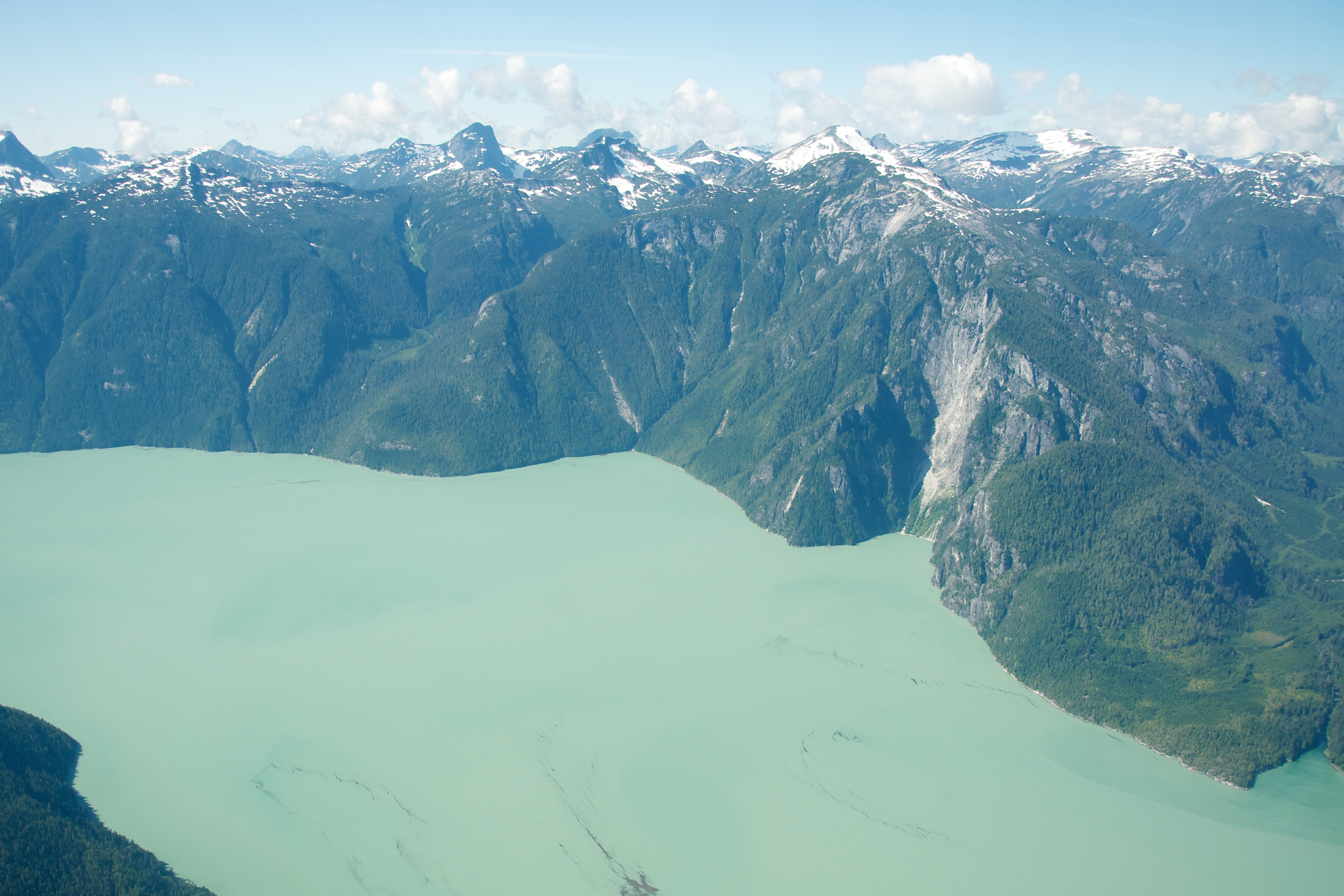
- Aerial view of Knight Inlet

- Location in British Columbia
- Location: Mount Waddington RD, British Columbia, Canada
- Coordinates: 50°41′01″N 125°52′29″W
- Type: Fjord
- Ocean/sea sources: Pacific Ocean

Knight Inlet (Kwakʼwala: dzawadi) is one of the principal inlets of the British Columbia Coast, and the largest of the major inlets in the southern part of the Coast. It is fifth in sequence of the great saltwater inlets north from the 49th parallel near Vancouver, but it is the first whose outflow points away from the Strait of Georgia, opening into Queen Charlotte Strait at the Kwakwakaʼwakw community of Memkumlis (often known by the name of the group who were based there, the Mamalilikala) on Village Island.

== Geography ==
The inlet's opening lies east of Malcolm Island and the fishing town of Port McNeill on Vancouver Island, and just north of the opening of the upper end of Johnstone Strait, which separates Vancouver Island from the archipelago between it and the mainland.

Knight Inlet is one of the longest on the BC Coast at about 125 km (78 mi) in length; it is about 2.5 km (1.6 mi) in average width. Its great volume of water causes a major current and severe turbulence at its mouth during tidal changes, and outflow winds from it, which pour out of the BC Interior, are a hazard to small vessels in the Queen Charlotte Strait. It is fed by the Klinaklini River, which begins on the western edge of the Chilcotin Plateau and is fed by the massive Klinaklini Glacier, one of the two main eastern "tongues" of the Ha-Iltzuk Icefield, one of the largest of the ice caps of the southern Coast Mountains and also home to the Silverthrone Caldera volcanic bowl.

== History ==
The inlet was first charted by William Broughton, George Vancouver's second-in-command during the first part of his 1791-95 expedition, in 1792. Broughton gave the inlet the name Knights Channel after John Knight (Royal Navy officer). Broughton and Knight were captured by American forces during the American Revolution and were held prisoner together until released in a prisoner exchange.

The inlet was mapped by early Spanish explorers as Braza de Vernaci.

== See also ==
- Bute Inlet
