= Machmell River =

Coordinates: 51°39′15″N 126°41′58″W

The Machmell River, also spelled Machmel River, is a river in the Pacific Ranges of the southern Coast Mountains in British Columbia, Canada. It flows west into Owikeno Lake.

== See also ==
- List of rivers of British Columbia
