= Klinaklini Glacier =

Glacier in British Columbia, Canada

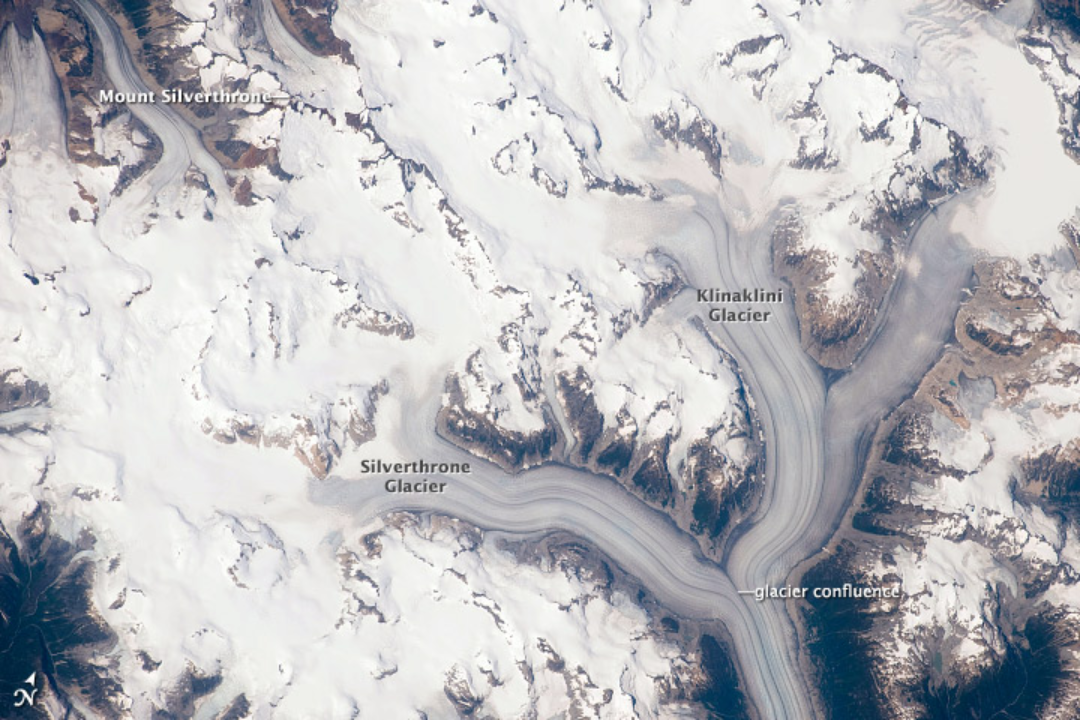
- Satellite image of the Klinaklini and Silverthrone glaciers

- Location within British Columbia
- Interactive map of Klinaklini Glacier
- Location: British Columbia
- Coordinates: 51°28′N 125°47′W
- Terminus: Proglacial lake
- Status: Retreating

Klinaklini Glacier is a glacier west of the Klinaklini River and head of Knight Inlet the Coast Land District of British Columbia, Canada. It is one of the largest glaciers in western North America. The Hakai Institute has installed a weather station and camera above Klinaklini Glacier that will provide data in near real time to scientists and operational users.
