= Ha-Iltzuk Icefield =

Icefield in British Columbia, Canada

Coordinates: 51°25′N 125°55′W

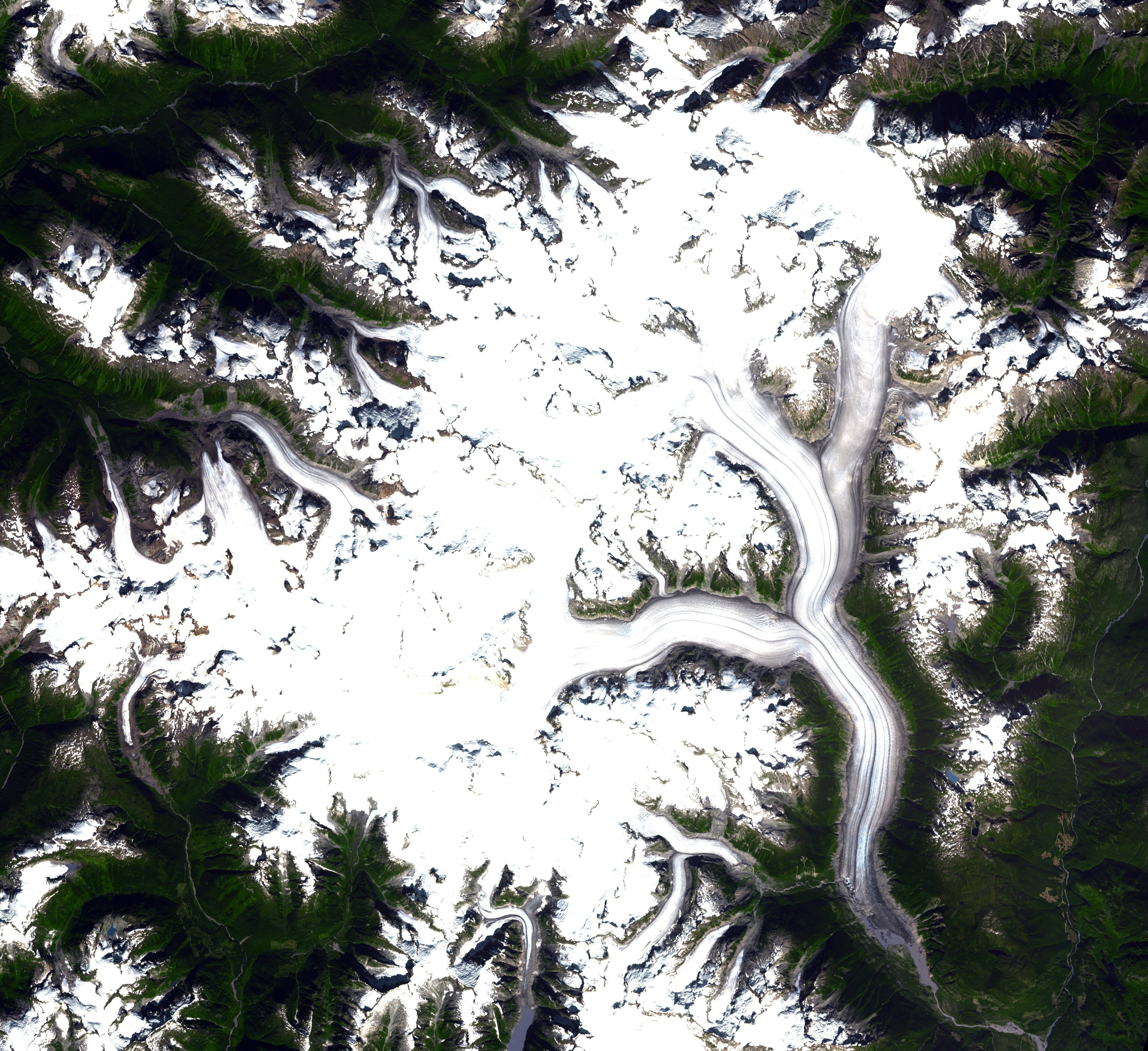
Satellite photo of the Ha-Iltzuk Icefield.

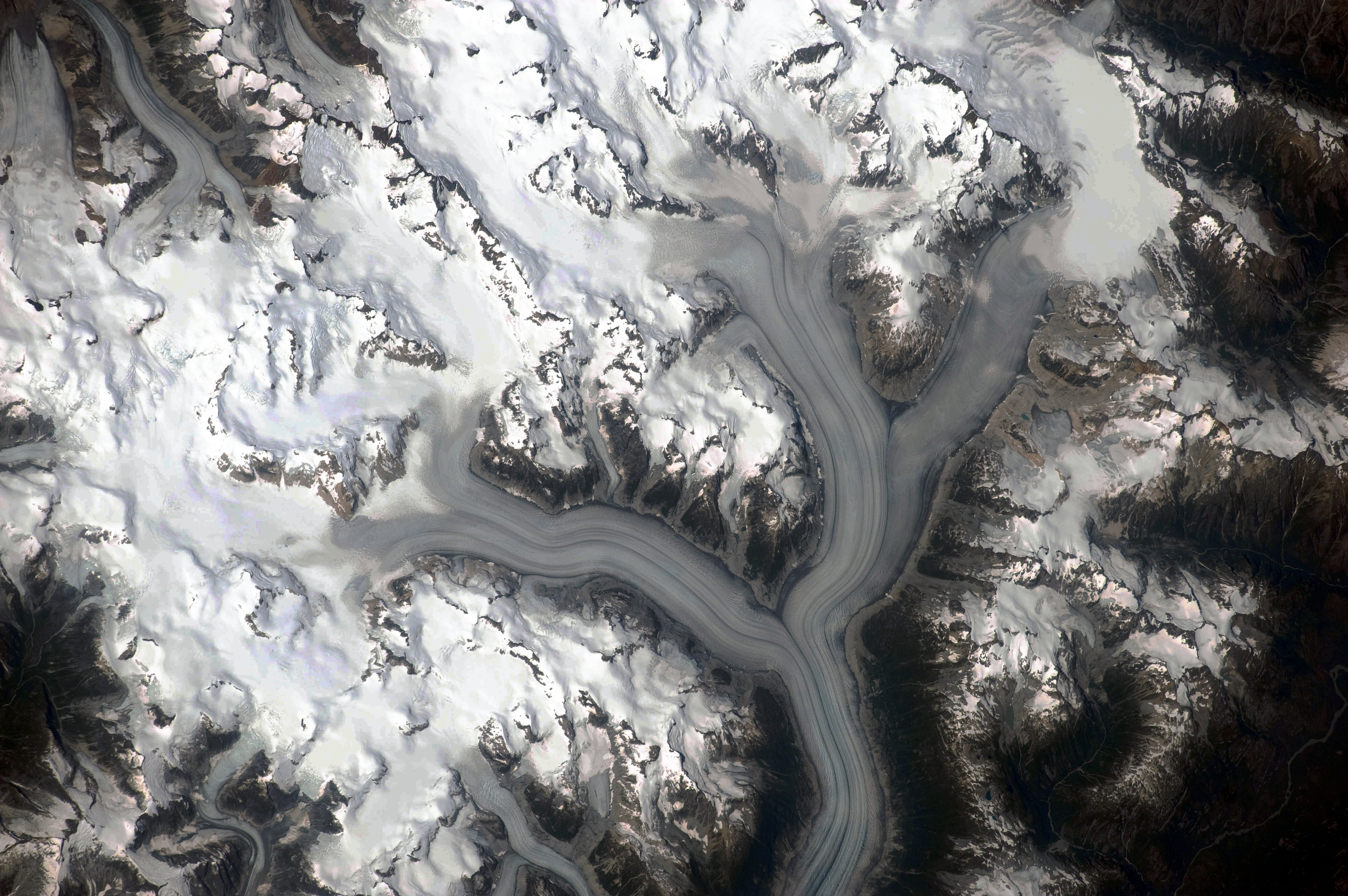
Astronaut photo of the icefield.

The Ha-Iltzuk Icefield (also spelled Heiltskuk Icefield and also called the Silverthrone Icefield) is an icefield in the central Pacific Ranges of the Coast Mountains in British Columbia, Canada. It is the largest icefield in the Coast Mountains south of the Alaska Panhandle, with an area of 3,610 km^{2} (1,390 sq mi). It is located on the west side of the Klinaklini River and the Waddington Range. The highest summit in the icefield is Silverthrone Mountain, which is a mountain on the northeast edge of a circular, 20 km (12 mi) wide, deeply dissected caldera complex called the Silverthrone Caldera.

The southern half of the icefield is named the Silverthrone Glacier and flows west, joining the Klinaklini Glacier just above that glacier's terminus, where its outflow is short but very large, and joins the Klinaklini River within a few kilometres. The Klinaklini Glacier constitutes the northern half of the icefield, and off its northwest edge a glacial tongue produces the head of the Machmell River. The name Ha-Iltzuk Icefield does not appear in government gazettes. The term is almost certainly a phonetic spelling of hailtzaq - the Heiltsuk language pronunciation for the term Heiltsuk.

== See also ==
- List of glaciers
- Lillooet Icecap
- Homathko Icefield
