= Pacific Ranges =

Subrange of the Coast Mountains in British Columbia, Canada

- French: Chaînons du Pacifique
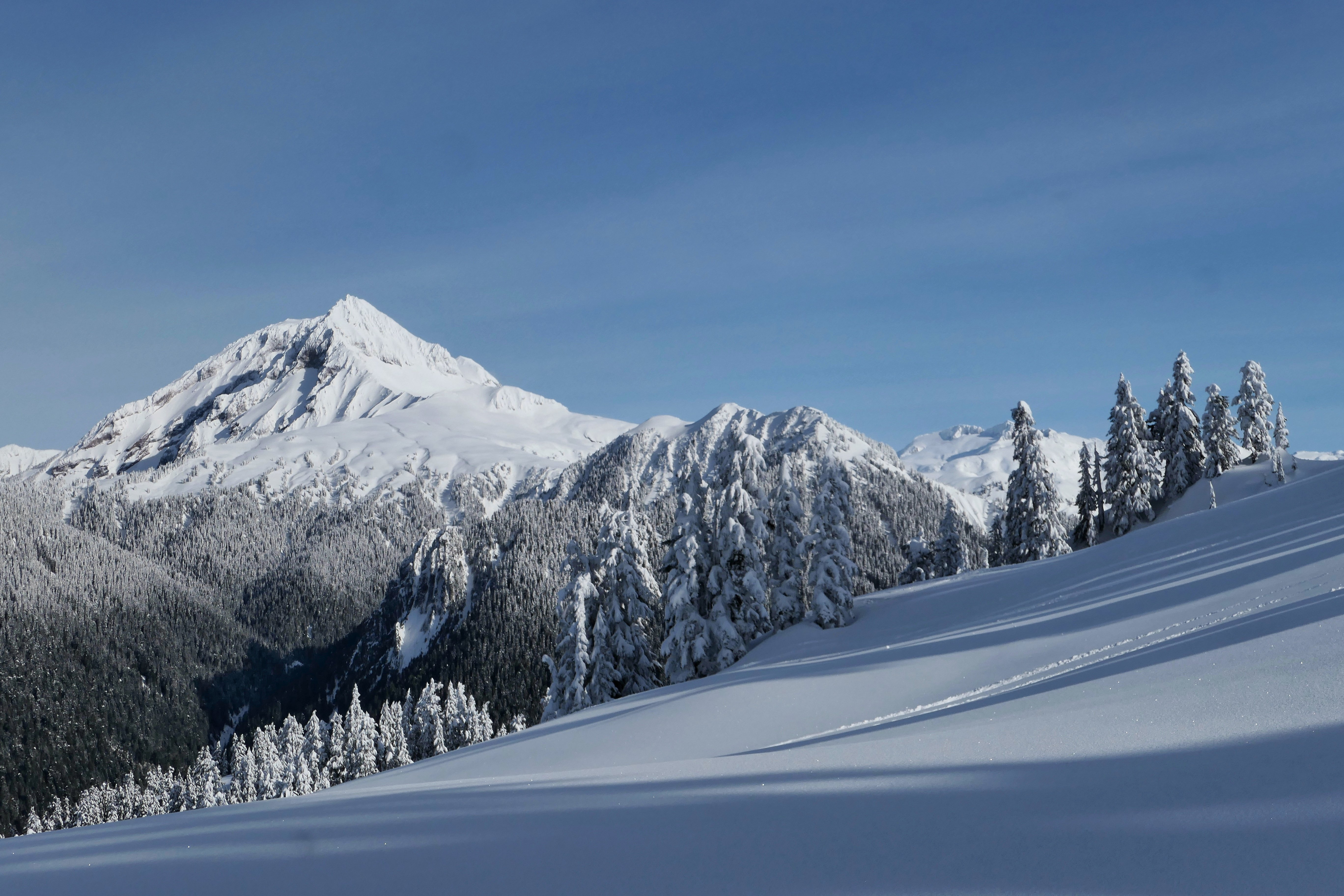
- Mount Garibaldi massif as seen from Squamish

Highest point
- Peak: Mount Waddington
- Elevation: 4,019 m (13,186 ft)
- Coordinates: 51°22′30″N 125°15′30″W

Dimensions
- Area: 108,237 km^{2} (41,791 mi^{2})

Geography
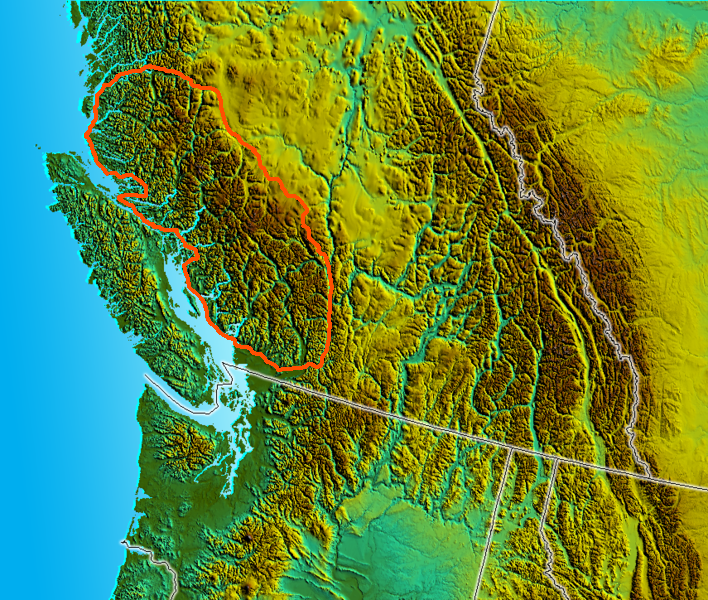
- Pacific Ranges as defined in S. Holland Landforms of British Columbia
- Location: British Columbia, Canada
- Parent range: Coast Mountains

The Pacific Ranges are the southernmost subdivision of the Coast Mountains portion of the Pacific Cordillera. Located entirely within British Columbia, Canada, they run northwest from the lower stretches of the Fraser River to Bella Coola and Burke Channel, north of which are the Kitimat Ranges. The Coast Mountains lie between the Interior Plateau and the Coast of British Columbia.

The Pacific Ranges include four of the five major coastal icecaps in the southern Coast Mountains. These are the largest temperate-latitude icecaps in the world and fuel a number of very major rivers (by volume, not length). One of these contains Mount Waddington, the highest summit entirely within British Columbia. Also within this region is Hunlen Falls, among the highest in Canada, located in Tweedsmuir South Provincial Park.

Other than logging and various hydroelectric developments, and a large ski resort at Whistler, most of the land in the range is completely undeveloped. Historically, in the southern part of the range, mining was important at various times in the Lillooet, Bridge River and Squamish areas, and large pulp and paper mills at Powell River, Port Mellon and Woodfibre. The largest hydroelectric development in the Pacific Ranges is the Bridge River Power Project, though smaller hydro plants are on the Stave River-Alouette Lake system in Mission and Maple Ridge, the Daisy Lake-Squamish River division of the Cheakamus Powerhouse, and another power dam and power plant at Clowhom. Although the range was extensively surveyed for possible rail routes, only that of the Pacific Great Eastern (now part of CN) was eventually built; the Homathko River-Bute Inlet route, however, was one of the two main choices in the deliberations of the CPR's routing.

== Geology ==
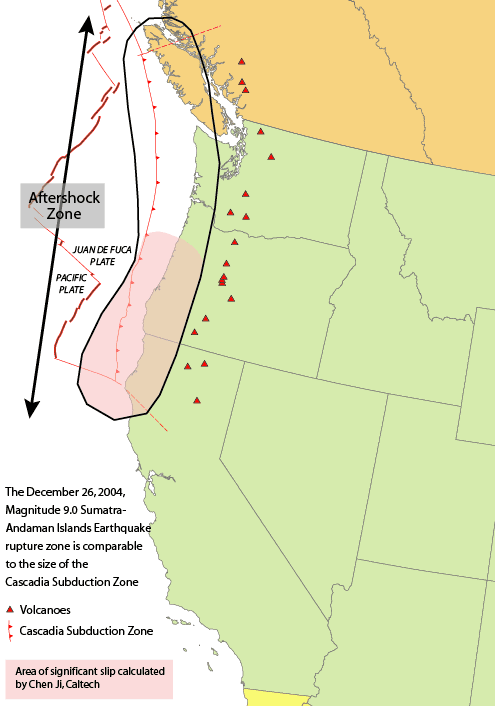
Area of the Cascadia subduction zone, including the Cascade Volcanic Arc (red triangles)

The Pacific Ranges are part of the southern portion of the Coast Plutonic Complex and has been characterized by rapid rates of uplift over the past 4 million years, which has led to relatively high rates of erosion.

The Garibaldi Volcanic Belt is within the Pacific Ranges, which is a volcanic belt formed by the subduction of the Juan de Fuca Plate (a remnant of the much larger Farallon Plate) under the North American Plate along the Cascadia subduction zone. The belt is the northern extension of the Cascade Volcanic Arc in the United States (which includes the volcanoes Mount St. Helens and Mount Baker) and contains the most explosive young volcanoes in Canada. The eruption styles in the belt range from effusive to explosive, with compositions from basalt to rhyolite. Morphologically, centers include calderas, cinder cones, stratovolcanoes and small isolated lava masses. Due to repeated continental and alpine glaciations, many of the volcanic deposits in the belt reflect complex interactions between magma composition, topography, and changing ice configurations. The most recent major catastrophic eruption in the Garibaldi Volcanic Belt was from the Mount Meager massif 2,350 BP, which is Canada's most recent major catastrophic eruption.

The Garibaldi Volcanic Belt contains two extra volcanic fields, the Franklin Glacier Complex and the Silverthrone Caldera, which lie 140 and 190 km northwest of the main volcanic belt.

The Cascadia subduction zone is a 680 mi (1,094 km) long fault, running 50 mi (80 km) off the west-coast of the Pacific Northwest from northern California to Vancouver Island. The plates move at a relative rate of over 0.4 inches (10 mm) per year at a somewhat oblique angle to the subduction zone.

Unlike most subduction zones worldwide, there is no oceanic trench present along the continental margin in Cascadia. Instead, terranes and the accretionary wedge have been uplifted to form a series of coast ranges and exotic mountains. A high rate of sedimentation from the outflow of the three major rivers (Fraser River, Columbia River, and Klamath River) which cross the Cascade Range contributes to further obscuring the presence of a trench. However, in common with most other subduction zones, the outer margin is slowly being compressed, similar to a giant spring. When the stored energy is suddenly released by slippage across the fault at irregular intervals, the Cascadia subduction zone can create very large earthquakes, such as the 8.7–9.2 M_{w} Cascadia earthquake of 1700.

== Major named subranges ==
- Niut Range
- Pantheon Range
- Waddington Range
- Whitemantle Range
- Chilcotin Ranges
  - Shulaps Range
  - Dickson Range
  - Camelsfoot Range
- Bendor Range
- Lillooet Ranges
  - Cayoosh Range
  - Cantilever Range
- Douglas Ranges
- Garibaldi Ranges
- North Shore Mountains (Front Ranges)
- Tantalus Range
- Clendinning Range
  - the Camelsfoot Range running north along the west bank of the Fraser from Lillooet is sometimes considered to be part of the Chilcotin Ranges, but in other definitions is part of the Interior Plateau

== Major icefields ==
(Other than the Waddington Range these are also considered to be "ranges" but are listed separately here because of their unique character).

- Monarch Icefield
- Ha-Iltzuk Icefield (Silverthrone Glacier)
- Waddington Range
- Homathko Icefield
- Lillooet Icecap (Lillooet Crown)
- Pemberton Icecap

== Major peaks ==
- Mount Waddington
- Monarch Mountain
- Mount Tiedemann
- Mount Munday
- Mount Queen Bess
- Mount Good Hope
- Mount Raleigh
- Monmouth Mountain
- Mount Tatlow
- Taseko Mountain
- Silverthrone Mountain
- Mount Meager massif
- Mount Cayley
- Mount Garibaldi
- Wedge Mountain
- Mount Bute

== Provincial parks ==
- Garibaldi Provincial Park
- Golden Ears Provincial Park
- Cypress Provincial Park
- Mount Seymour Provincial Park
- Sasquatch Provincial Park
- Stein Valley Nlaka'pamux Heritage Park
- Birkenhead Lake Provincial Park
- Big Creek Provincial Park
- Spruce Lake Protected Area
- Tsʼilʔos Provincial Park
- Tweedsmuir North Provincial Park and Protected Area
- Tweedsmuir South Provincial Park

== Major rivers ==
- Fraser River
- Chilcotin River
- Bridge River
- Lillooet River
- Squamish River
- Homathko River
- Klinaklini River
- Bella Coola River
