= The Barrier =

Lava dam in British Columbia, Canada

- Lava dam
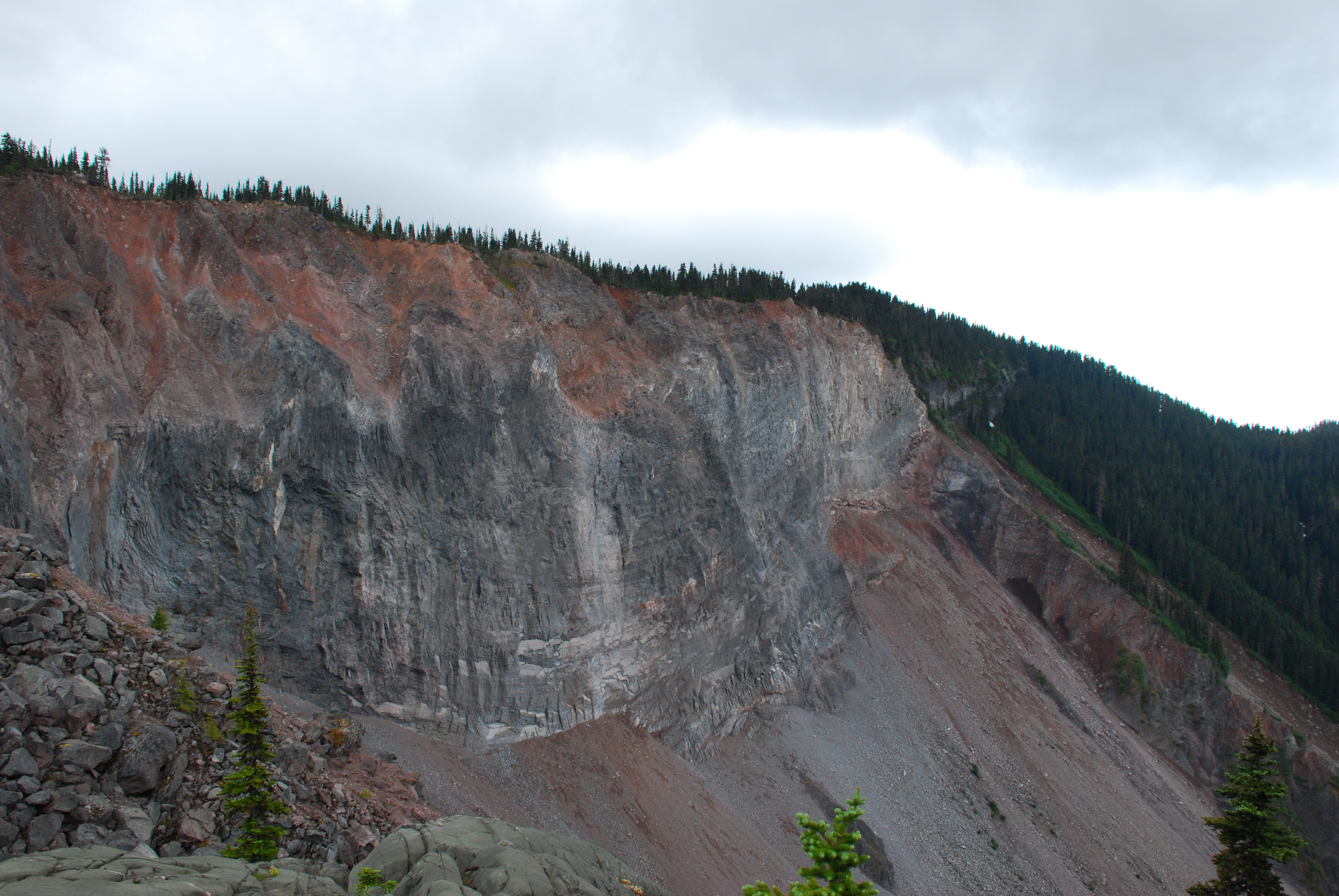
- The rockfall area and the edge of The Barrier

- Location within British Columbia
- Location in Garibaldi Provincial Park
- Coordinates: 49°56′32″N 123°05′59″W
- Location: British Columbia, Canada
- Range: Coast Mountains
- Part of: Mount Price complex
- Age: About 13,000 years old
- Formed by: Glaciovolcanism
- Geology: Andesite

Dimensions
  - Length: 2.4 km (1.5 mi)
  - Width: 0.80 km (0.5 mi) at headwall
  - Height: 500 m (1,600 ft) at headwall
- Volcanic field: Garibaldi Lake volcanic field
- Topo map: 92G14 Cheakamus River
- Designation: Garibaldi Provincial Park
- Dams: Rubble Creek valley
- Impounds: Garibaldi Lake; Lesser Garibaldi Lake; Barrier Lake

The Barrier is a lava dam retaining the Garibaldi Lake system in southwestern British Columbia, Canada. It is about 80 kilometres (50 miles) north of Vancouver in Garibaldi Provincial Park of New Westminster Land District. The Barrier lies in the Cheakamus River watershed of the southern Coast Mountains where snow-capped mountains, diverse vegetation and rich geological history exist. Garibaldi Lake is the largest lake impounded by The Barrier; it has a length of 5.23 km (3.25 mi) and a width of 2.4 km (1.5 mi). The much smaller Lesser Garibaldi and Barrier lakes are also impounded by The Barrier. However, they lie within depressions on the surface of the lava dam rather than behind it. All three lakes are drained by Rubble Creek, a tributary of the Cheakamus River flowing northwest from the foot of The Barrier.

The Barrier formed about 13,000 years ago when lava flowed into Rubble Creek valley. It then ponded and cooled against the retreating Cordilleran Ice Sheet, resulting in the lava flow being unusually thick. The source of the lava flow was Clinker Peak on the western shoulder of Mount Price, a stratovolcano reaching an elevation of 2,049 metres (6,722 feet). In 1855–1856, The Barrier was the source of a large rock avalanche that travelled down Rubble Creek valley to the Cheakamus River. This collapse of the lava dam created its current headwall; it rises about 500 m (1,600 ft) above the floor of Rubble Creek valley. The headwall has been highly unstable since the 1855–1856 landslide, having been the site of several rockfalls. Debris from these rockfalls has formed a talus deposit at the base of the headwall.

Concerns about The Barrier's instability prompted the provincial government to declare the area immediately below it unsafe for human habitation in 1980–1981. This led to the evacuation of the small resort village of Garibaldi nearby and the relocation of residents to new recreational subdivisions away from the hazard zone. As of 2025, The Barrier merits consideration in future volcanic hazard assessments. This is particularly due to the presence of Garibaldi Lake, which would be released catastrophically if the lava dam were to ever give out.

== Name ==
This feature has been referred to as The Barrier since at least the 1910s. The name was adopted on the British Columbia map 2D on May 6, 1924, which referred to The Barrier as a mountain. On June 6, 1957, the name was adopted on the National Topographic System map 92G/14; this map referred to The Barrier as a cliff instead of a mountain. BC Geographical Names describes The Barrier as a cliff and a natural volcanic dam.

== Geography ==
=== Location ===
The Barrier is located about 80 kilometres (50 miles) north of Vancouver between the communities of Squamish and Whistler. It lies within Garibaldi Provincial Park, a more than 20,000-hectare (49,000-acre) protected area in the southern Coast Mountains. This wilderness park incorporates much of the Cheakamus River watershed and contains snow-capped mountains, diverse vegetation, iridescent waters, scenic vistas and rich geological history. The main territorial division in the area is New Westminster Land District which includes the southwestern portion of mainland British Columbia, as well as offshore islands and waterways.

=== Hydrology ===
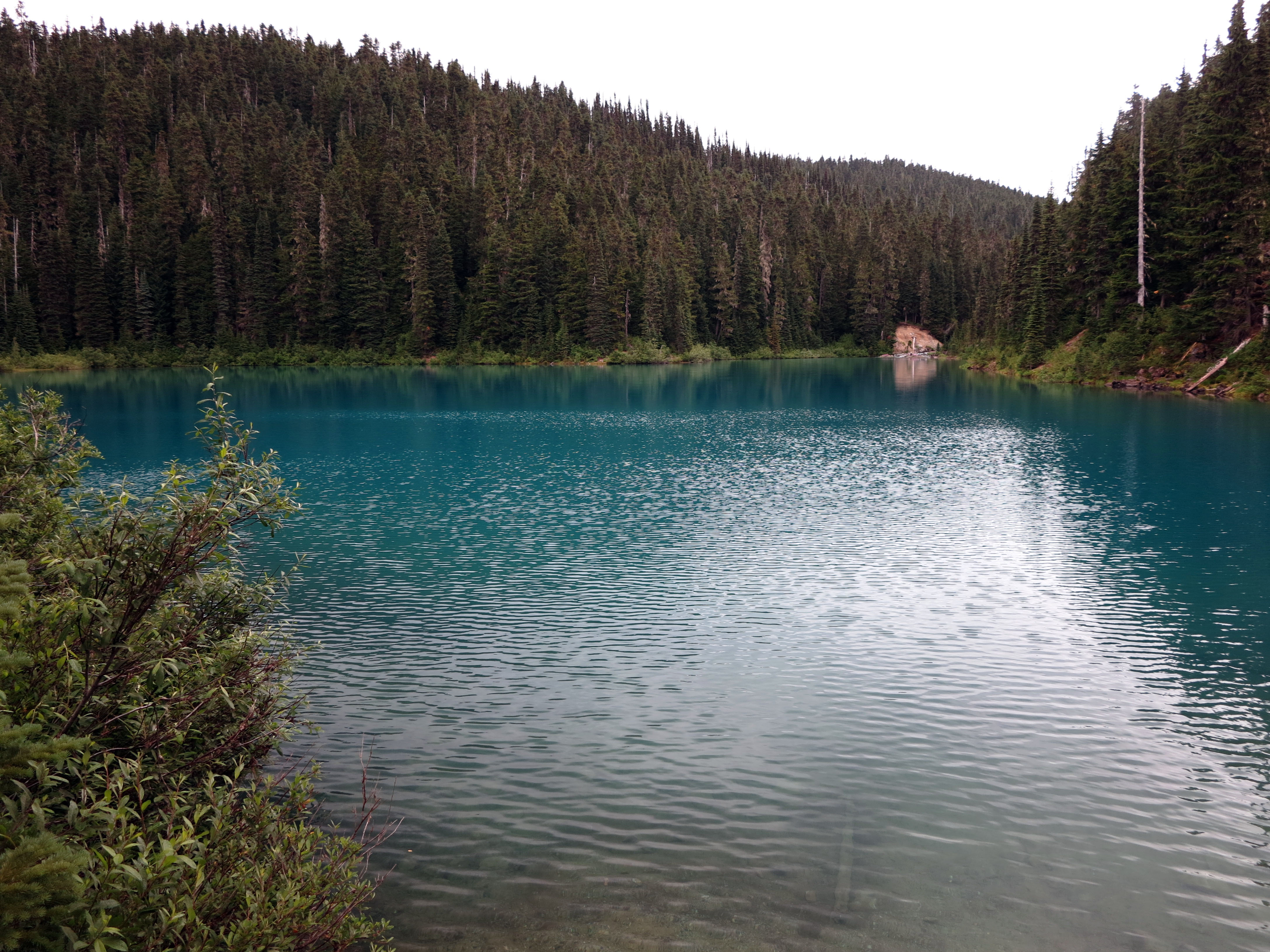
Barrier Lake from the west shore

Garibaldi Lake on the northern side of Mount Garibaldi is the main lake impounded by The Barrier. It lies within the heart of Garibaldi Provincial Park and is fed by meltwater streams originating from glaciers. With a length of 5.23 km (3.25 mi) and a width of 2.4 km (1.5 mi), Garibaldi Lake is the largest lake in Garibaldi Provincial Park. This 250-metre-deep (820-foot) lake has a water volume of 1 km^{3} (0.24 mi^{3}) and a surface elevation of 1,470 m (4,820 ft). It is drained by Rubble Creek, which flows into the much smaller Lesser Garibaldi Lake.

Lesser Garibaldi Lake lies within a depression on top of The Barrier where Rubble Creek follows a subterranean channel under the volcanic dam. Rubble Creek then reappears at the foot of The Barrier in a pair of springs before flowing northwesterly through a valley to the Cheakamus River 4.5 km (2.8 mi) downstream. At times of exceptionally high water, a part of Rubble Creek flows over the surface to Barrier Lake at the northwesternmost end of The Barrier. Rubble Creek then cascades over The Barrier into the lower valley.

== Geology ==
=== Background ===
The Barrier is part of the Mount Price volcanic complex, which also includes the 2,049 m (6,722 ft) high stratovolcano of Mount Price and the 1,983 m (6,506 ft) high stratovolcano of Clinker Peak on the western shoulder of Mount Price. This complex was formed by the eruption of lavas and pyroclastic flows during three periods of volcanic activity in the last 1.2 million years; the lavas and pyroclastic flows are andesitic and dacitic in composition. The Mount Price complex is the oldest eruptive centre in the Garibaldi Lake volcanic field, which also includes Cinder Cone, The Black Tusk and The Table.

Volcanism throughout the Garibaldi Lake volcanic field has produced a broader range of volcanic rocks; among them are andesite, dacite, basaltic andesite and basalt. The volcanic field is part of the Garibaldi Volcanic Belt, which includes several other volcanic fields such as the Mount Garibaldi, Mount Meager, Mount Cayley, Bridge River and Squamish fields. Volcanism in the Garibaldi Volcanic Belt, which began about three million years ago, is the result of subduction along the western continental margin of North America.

=== Structure ===
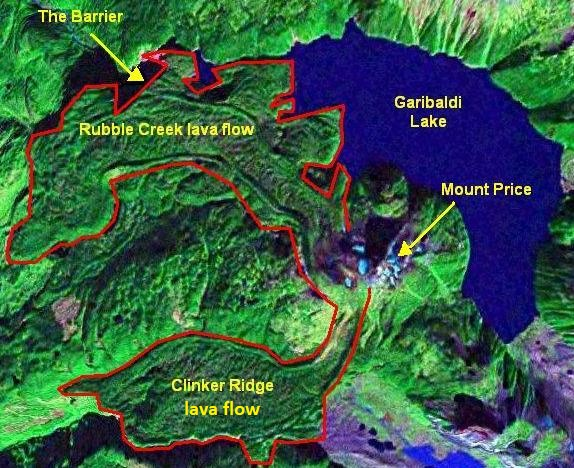
False colour image of the Mount Price area showing the location of The Barrier

The Barrier formed about 13,000 years ago when the Cordilleran Ice Sheet had retreated from higher elevations but still existed in lower valleys. During this time, an andesite lava flow was erupted from Clinker Peak and then entered Rubble Creek valley for 2.4 km (1.5 mi) where it ponded against the ice. The Barrier, which has a width of 0.80 km (0.5 mi) and a thickness of at least 250 m (820 ft) at its headwall, consists of unusually thick andesite lava as a result of this impoundment. Pseudo-pillow joints and irregular, radiating and horizontal columnar joints are present in The Barrier; they are indicative of lava cooling against ice. The andesite comprising The Barrier is red to grey in colour, oxidized and covered with rubble. At the base of the headwall is an extensive apron of talus, which may be obscuring gravel or volcanic breccia.

At the top of the headwall, about 500 m (1,600 ft) above the floor of Rubble Creek valley, the rock texture changes from glassy columnar joints to an ʻaʻā surface with marginal levees and transverse wrinkles typical of subaerial lava flows. This suggests that the ice sheet had an elevation of around 1,370 m (4,490 ft) at the time of the Clinker Peak eruption. The northern margin of the lava flow contains four lateral lava lobes, each of which was apparently fed via subsurface breaks in the northern levee. Two of the lobes block a pre-existing drainage system; the eastern lobe forms the Garibaldi Lake basin whereas the western lobe forms the headwall of The Barrier. Lesser Garibaldi Lake lies between these two lava lobes. Barrier Lake is between the western lobe and Cretaceous sedimentary rocks forming the northern side of upper Rubble Creek valley.

The Barrier is a highly unstable feature, having been the site of several rock failures in the last 13,000 years. These failures have resulted in rockfalls, debris flows and rock avalanches that have travelled down Rubble Creek valley where they have deposited debris. Small rockfalls from the headwall of The Barrier appear to rarely occur during winter when the talus apron is covered with snow. However, they are common during summer when the talus apron is snow-free. Small rockfalls during summer are commonly characterized by the rattle of rocks during brief intervals; dust clouds rising from the headwall have been observed kilometres away. Catastrophic failures of The Barrier are rare, but they have occurred as recently as 1855–1856.

==== 1855–1856 landslide ====
In the fall or winter of 1855–1856, a major landslide involving 30,000,000 m^{3} (1.1×10^{9} ft^{3}) of volcanic rock created the current headwall of The Barrier. This rock avalanche devastated Rubble Creek valley and travelled 4.5 km (2.8 mi) downstream where it reached the Cheakamus River possibly within 10 minutes. It had a maximum drop of 1,060 m (3,480 ft) and is estimated to have achieved a speed exceeding 72 km/h (45 mph). Debris from the landslide is exposed along the valley walls of Rubble Creek as thin but nearly continuous bands. They are easily distinguishable from the local glacial deposits and country rocks; volcanic fragments are only widely scattered above the bands. This debris forms a 3.5 km (2.2 mi) long and 200–350 m (660–1,150 ft) wide deposit with an area of 1.1 km^{2} (0.42 mi^{2}). The most distal deposits of the landslide are in Cheakamus Valley where they overlie the alluvial fan of Rubble Creek and locally occur west of the Cheakamus River. Crossing these deposits is the Sea-to-Sky Corridor, which includes Highway 99 and surrounding communities. Large boulders from the landslide form the forest floor along Highway 99 where it skirts close to the Cheakamus River.

The first written record of the 1855–1856 slide is that of Major W. Downie in 1858, who reported that "...about noon we struck into a lagoon, or large tract of overflowed land, the Indians say this was overflowed three years ago. We found the cause of it as we came along, a lake has broken away in the mountains, and swept away ridge after ridge, covering a whole forest of timber, with rocks and sand for a space of 6 or 7 square miles, changed the course of the river, and not left a stump to be seen, where the tall timber stood three years ago." Downie's explanation has been considered to be speculative and his estimate of the landslide deposit has been considered to be excessive. However, Downie's record clearly suggests that a sudden and widespread disaster had occurred in the area three years prior to his visit. By the 1950s, the terminus of the landslide deposit had already been obscured by trees of comparable size to those that had not been destroyed by the landslide.

The exact cause of the landslide remains unknown, but it may have resulted from major overflows of Barrier Lake. Another possibility is that high water pressure behind or beneath the failed slide block may have contributed to its release. This is because most of the water draining from Garibaldi Lake and Lesser Garibaldi Lake flows through subterranean channels in or under The Barrier. The landslide may have also been caused by a small but locally significant earthquake that went unnoticed; the closest white residents lived about 80 km (50 mi) to the south at the time of the landslide.

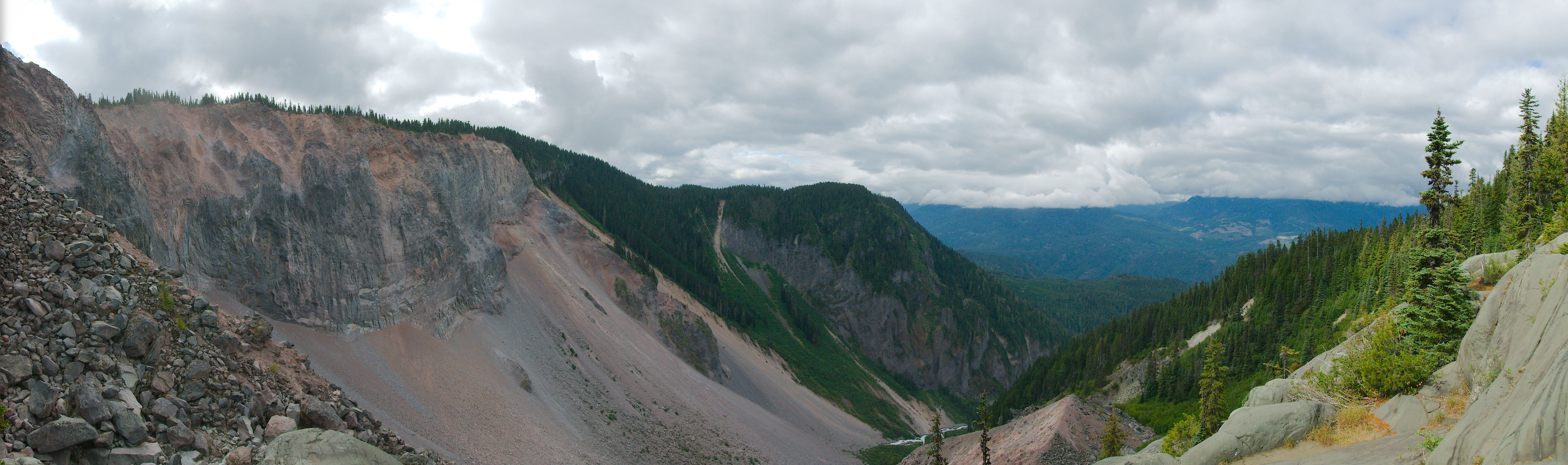
A panorama of The Barrier headwall from The Barrier viewpoint

==== Later landslides ====
Several smaller landslides have occurred at The Barrier since 1855–1856. This includes a major rockfall from the headwall in 1977 and minor rockfalls from both the headwall and the basal talus apron in 2017. The 1977 event occurred on December 24 and was heard by residents 3 km (1.9 mi) to the west. It involved the collapse of an approximately 200 m (660 ft) long and 200 m (660 ft) high segment of The Barrier where its headwall consists of large vertical columnar joints. The rockfalls in 2017 were recorded from August to November using lidar technology; October was the only month with no recorded rockfalls. During August, September and November, more than 50% of the rockfalls originated within 1 m (3.3 ft) of scars from previous landslides.

=== Hazards ===
As of 2025, The Barrier merits consideration in future volcanic hazard assessments, particularly due to the presence of Garibaldi Lake upstream. Lakes dammed by lava flows can cause flooding downstream if conditions favour rapid erosion of lake outlets. A catastrophic release of Garibaldi Lake would cause large quantities of water to flow through the head of Rubble Creek, which has its confluence with the Cheakamus River just below the BC Hydro dam impounding Daisy Lake. The water flowing through The Barrier from Garibaldi Lake is considered to be draining along the bedrock-lava contact. Flooding of the Cheakamus River caused by the failure of landslide dams created by rock failures from The Barrier poses a hazard to infrastructure downstream. Hazards posed by The Barrier are widely publicized in local media, such as Pique Newsmagazine and The Squamish Chief.

==== Landslides ====
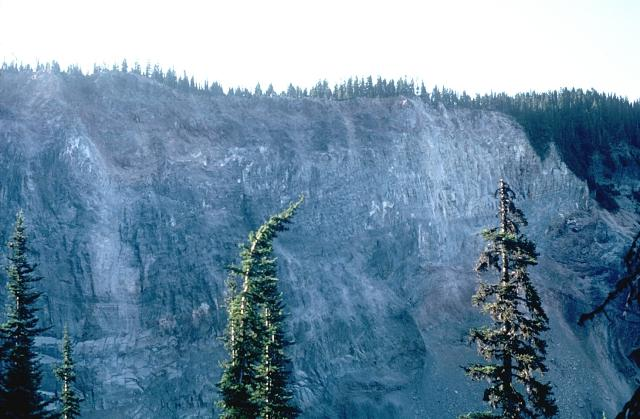
The unvegetated headwall of The Barrier

Concerns about The Barrier's instability due to volcanic, tectonic or heavy rainfall activity prompted the Government of British Columbia to declare the area immediately below it unsafe for human habitation in 1980–1981. This led to the evacuation of the small resort village of Garibaldi nearby and the relocation of residents to new recreational subdivisions away from the hazard zone. The area below and adjacent to The Barrier has since been referred to as the Barrier Civil Defence Zone by BC Parks. Another landslide comparable in size to the one in 1855–1856 is still possible since a large volume of rock still exists behind the headwall of The Barrier. Landslides of such size are unlikely to occur in the near future. However, warning signs are posted at the zone to make visitors aware of the potential danger and to minimize the chance of fatalities in the event of a slide. For safety reasons, BC Parks recommends visitors not to camp, stop or linger in the Barrier Civil Defence Zone.

A rockfall reported in September 2017 prompted an assessment from the provincial Ministry of Forests, Lands, Natural Resource Operations and Rural Development. Dave Southam, the district manager for the Sea to Sky Natural Resource District at the time, said "We had one of our qualified professionals attend the next day, look at it from the air, and he quickly came to the conclusion that there was no immediate threat to the public." Southam also said "Just being abundantly cautious, we always make sure that we have our professional team look at it and make an assessment on whether or not there is any downstream or downhill threats to the infrastructure or public safety."

==== Outburst floods ====
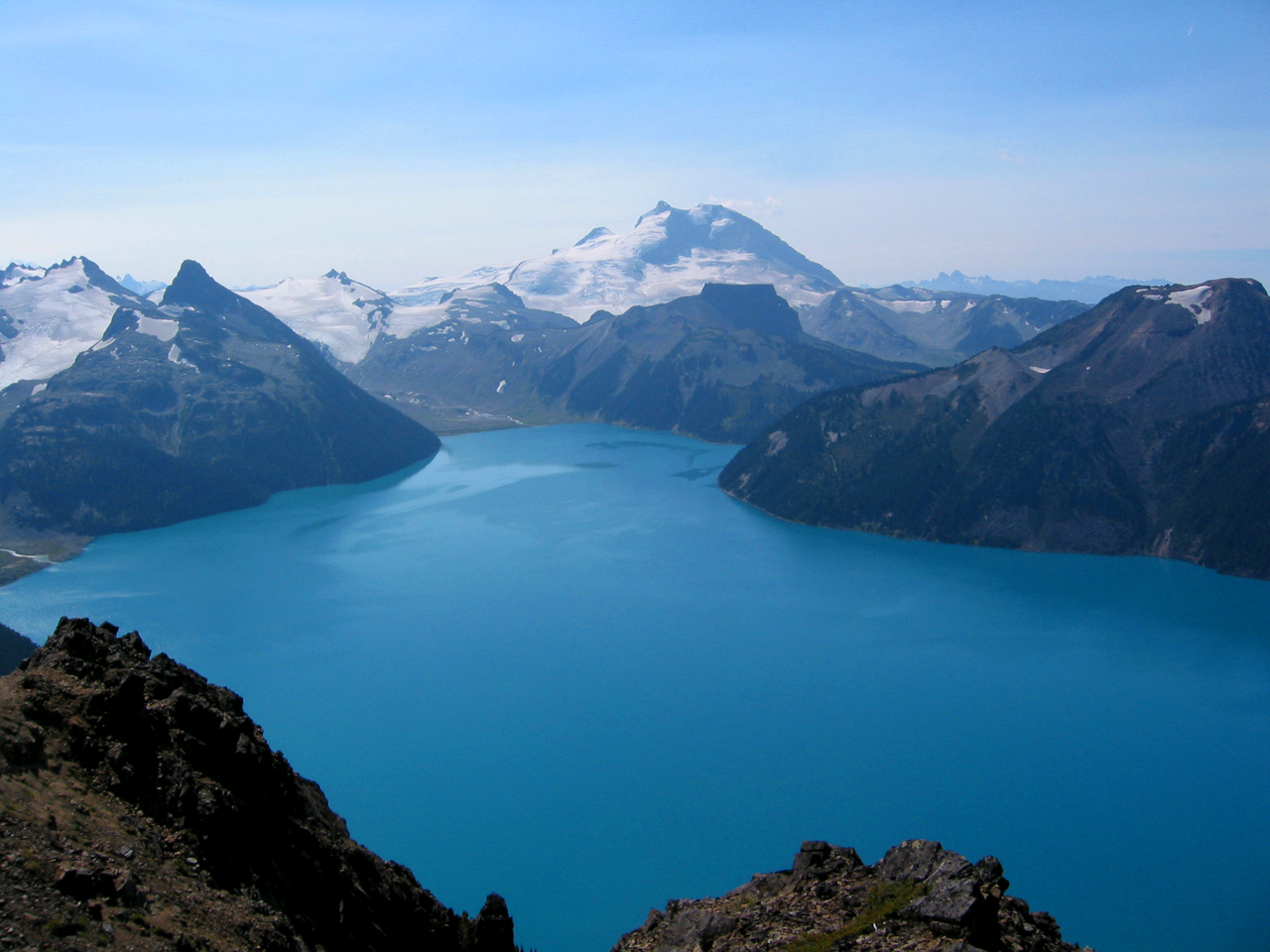
Garibaldi Lake from Panorama Ridge

In 2014–2015, Quest University geologist Steve Quane mapped and assessed the danger Garibaldi Lake poses if The Barrier were to ever give out. "The lava barrier is an unstable dam for this big lake in the mountains above a town" Quane said, referring to the town of Squamish. If The Barrier were to collapse catastrophically to release Garibaldi Lake in its entirety, the amount of energy released would potentially be 200 times more than that of the bomb dropped on Hiroshima. Greyson Herdman, a student of Quest University, said "If the barrier were to explode or fall apart in an earthquake, the wave that would be produced by all that water flowing out of Garibaldi Lake down into Squamish would be 120 metres high." The amount of water flowing out of Garibaldi Lake in such a scenario would be large enough to create an impact-wave in Howe Sound and cause cataclysmic damage; Squamish would be obliterated. Geologically, the chances of Garibaldi Lake being completely released by a catastrophic collapse of The Barrier are almost certain. However, the probability of this happening anytime soon is considered to be extremely low. Rubble Creek draining from the base of The Barrier may be undermining its structure; Quane said that such undermining would be "bad for the dam".

=== Significance ===
The Barrier was the first recognized ice-marginal lava flow in the Garibaldi Volcanic Belt. It was also one of the first described ice-impounded lava flows on Earth, having been studied by Canadian geologist Bill Mathews in the 1950s. The Barrier is one of the best-described and most accessible impoundment features in the Garibaldi Volcanic Belt. Other impoundment features in this volcanic belt include The Table, Ring Mountain, Little Ring Mountain and Cauldron Dome. The headwall of The Barrier serves as a near-vertical cross section of a lava flow that ponded and cooled against glacial ice. Ice-marginal lava flows, such as The Barrier, are useful in delineating the margins of ice sheets.

== Accessibility ==
Daisy Lake Road, 30 km (19 mi) north of Squamish, provides access to The Barrier from Highway 99. At the end of this 2.5 km (1.6 mi) long road is the Rubble Creek parking lot, from which the 7.5 km (4.7 mi) long Garibaldi Lake Trail begins. This graded hiking trail switchbacks more than 20 times as it climbs 770 m (2,530 ft) up the northern side of Rubble Creek valley. About 6 km (3.7 mi) down the trail is a junction with the Taylor Meadows route; the right fork leads to Garibaldi Lake. A short distance beyond this junction is another route that branches off the Garibaldi Lake Trail; this branch leads to The Barrier viewpoint. The Barrier cannot be accessed using snowmobiles, motorcycles, trail bikes, aircraft or all-terrain vehicles since they are prohibited in Garibaldi Provincial Park.

== See also ==
- Volcanism of Western Canada
