= Clinker =

Clinker may refer to:

- Cement clinker, a kilned then quenched cement product
- Clinker (boat building), construction method for wooden boats
- Clinker (waste), waste from industrial processes, particularly coal burning
- Clinkers (album), a 1978 album by saxophonist Steve Lacy
- Clinker brick, rough dark-coloured bricks
- Clinker Peak, a volcanic peak in British Columbia, Canada
- Clinker Ridge, a mountain ridge in British Columbia. Canada
- Gary James Joynes, a.k.a. Clinker
- Mount Price (British Columbia), formerly known as Clinker Mountain

Clinker may also refer to:

- Small rocks that form in some ʻAʻā lava flows
- Waste from coal-seam fires

== Surname ==
- Cletus Clinker (1911–1979), American football player and coach
- Humphry Clinker, title character of Tobias Smollett's 1771 novel The Expedition of Humphry Clinker
