= Black Tusk =

Black Tusk may refer to:

- Black Tusk (band), an American heavy metal band
- Black Tusk Studios, a Canadian video game development studio
- The Black Tusk, a mountain in British Columbia, Canada
