= Barrier Lake (British Columbia) =

Lake in British Columbia, Canada

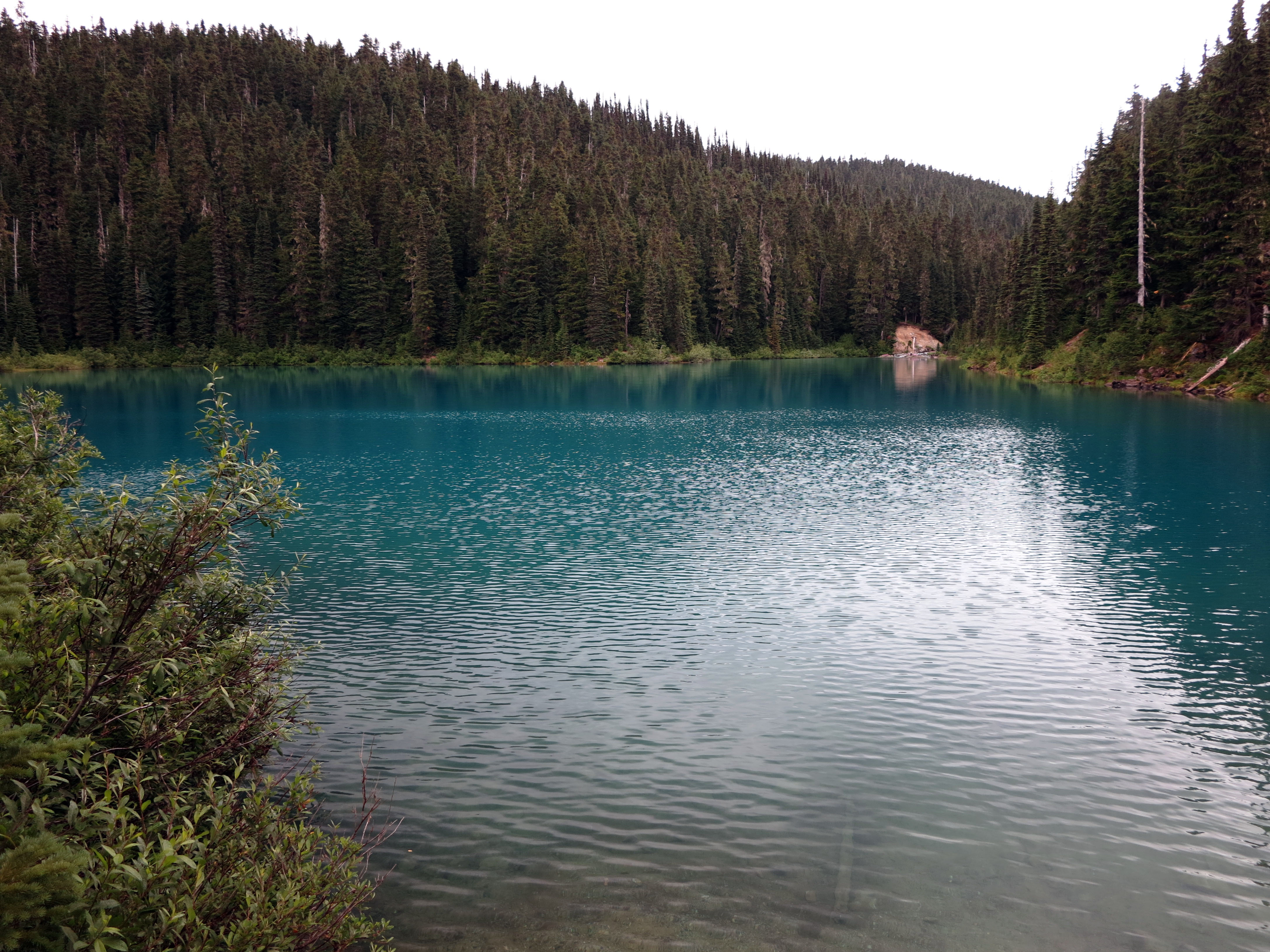
- Looking east from the shore of Barrier Lake

- Location within British Columbia
- Location: British Columbia, Canada
- Coordinates: 49°56′52″N 123°04′52″W

Barrier Lake, formerly called Stony Lake, is a small lake in New Westminster Land District of southwestern British Columbia, Canada. It is located west of Garibaldi Lake in Garibaldi Provincial Park. The name of the lake was adopted on September 2, 1930, for its association with The Barrier, a volcanic dam retaining the Garibaldi Lake system. Barrier Lake has a mean annual discharge of 10.44 m^{3}/s (369 cu ft/s).

Barrier Lake is an expansion of Rubble Creek, which flows northwest into the Cheakamus River. This stream follows a subterranean channel under The Barrier at Lesser Garibaldi Lake just to the southeast, but at times of exceptionally high water, a part of it flows over the surface of the volcanic dam to Barrier Lake. Rubble Creek then flows through an outlet at the southwestern end of Barrier Lake where it flows over the headwall of The Barrier into the lower valley.

Barrier Lake lies within a depression that straddles on a contact between andesitic lava of The Barrier and sedimentary rocks forming the northern side of upper Rubble Creek valley. The sedimentary rocks are of Cretaceous age, whereas the andesitic lava is of Late Pleistocene age. About 13,000 years ago, the andesitic lava was erupted from Clinker Peak and flowed into Rubble Creek valley where it ponded and cooled against residual glacial ice to form The Barrier.

The lava lobe damming the southern end of Barrier Lake apparently formed when molten lava broke through the northern levee of The Barrier lava flow. Because the lake is in close proximity to the unstable headwall of The Barrier, it has been suggested that Barrier Lake, along with Lesser Garibaldi Lake, could be released in the event of a catastrophic collapse. If these lakes were to be released, they could initiate a debris flow capable of blocking the Cheakamus River or running out into Daisy Lake. However, the probability of this happening is considered to be very low.

== See also ==
- List of lakes of British Columbia
