= List of peaks named Cinder Cone =

Cinder Cone is the proper name of 2 peaks in Canada and 7 peaks in the United States:

In Canada:

Name	CGNDB link	Province	Region	NTS map	Coordinates
Cinder Cone		British Columbia	New Westminster Land District	92G/14	49°58′18″N 123°0′26″W
Cindercone Peak		British Columbia	Range 3 Coast Land District	93C/14	52°46′12″N 125°18′59″W

In the United States:

Name	USGS link	State	County	USGS map	Coordinates
Cinder Cone and the Fantastic Lava Beds		California	Lassen	Prospect Peak	40°32′51″N 121°19′08″W
Cinder Cone		California	Shasta	Coble Mountain	40°55′57″N 121°21′46″W
Cinder Cone		California	Siskiyou	Hotlum	41°28′39″N 122°17′15″W
Cinder Cone		California	Siskiyou	Little Glass Mountain	41°31′43″N 121°38′48″W
Cinder Cone Butte		Idaho	Ada	Cinder Cone Butte	43°13′10″N 115°59′32″W
Cinder Cone		Oregon	Deschutes	China Hat	43°39′05″N 121°07′27″W
Cinder Cone		Oregon	Wasco	Boulder Lake	44°50′24″N 121°44′39″W
