= Garibaldi Lake volcanic field =

Volcanic field in Canada

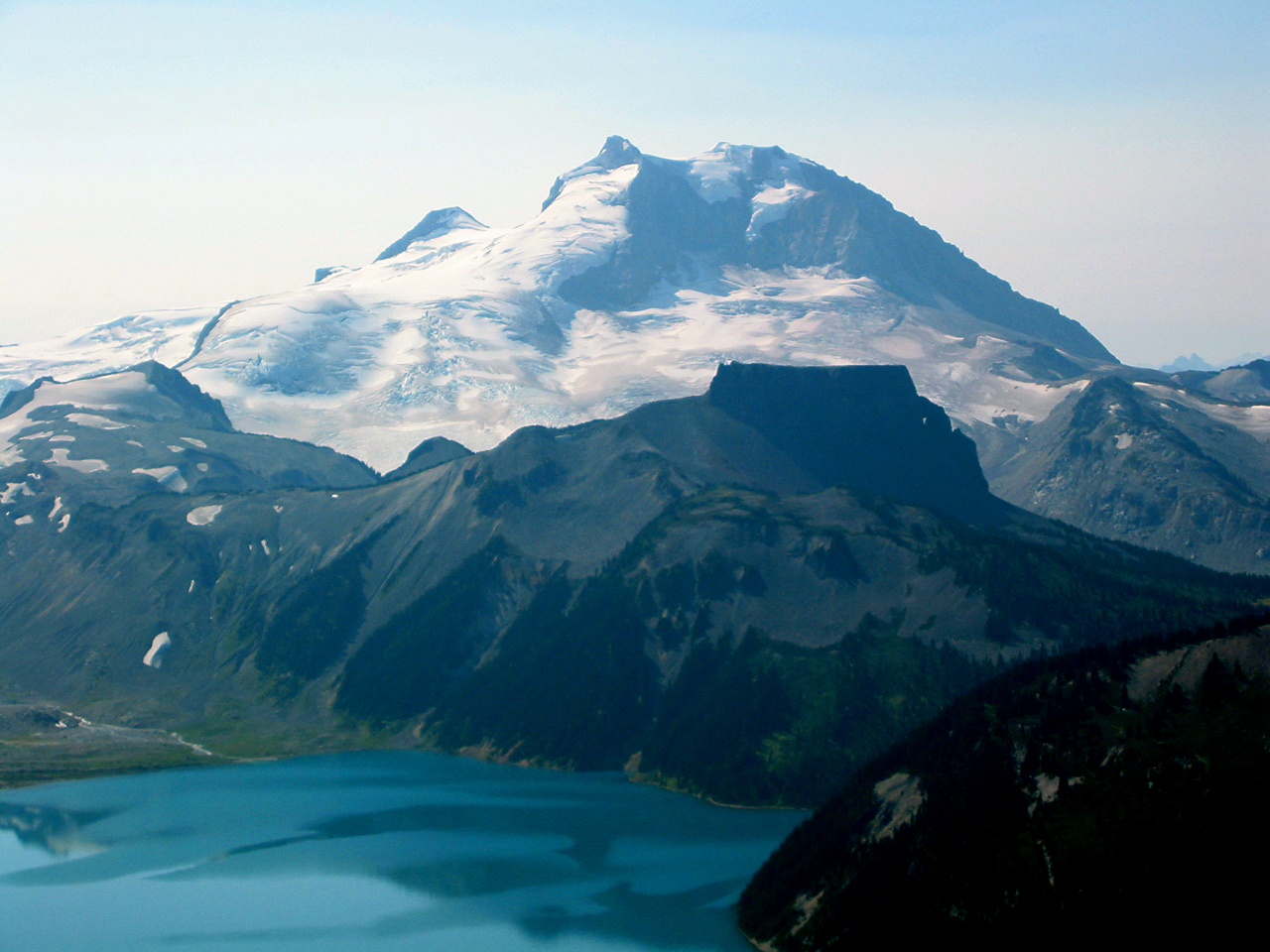
- The north face of Mount Garibaldi rises above The Table and Garibaldi Lake

Highest point
- Elevation: 2,316 m (7,598 ft)
- Coordinates: 49.92°N 123.03°W

Geography
- Location: British Columbia, Canada
- Parent range: Garibaldi Ranges

Geology
- Formed by: Subduction zone volcanism
- Volcanic arc: Canadian Cascade Arc
- Volcanic belt: Garibaldi Volcanic Belt
- Last eruption: Holocene age

The Garibaldi Lake volcanic field is a volcanic field, located in British Columbia, Canada. It was formed by a group of nine small andesitic stratovolcanoes and basaltic andesite vents in the scenic Garibaldi Lake area immediately north of Mount Garibaldi during the late Pleistocene and early Holocene. The oldest stratovolcano, The Black Tusk, formed between about 1.3 and 1.1 million years ago (Ma). Following glacial dissection, renewed volcanism produced the lava dome and flow forming its summit. Other Pleistocene vents are located along and to the west of the Cheakamus River. Cinder Cone, to the east of The Black Tusk, produced a 9-km-long lava flow during the late Pleistocene or early Holocene.

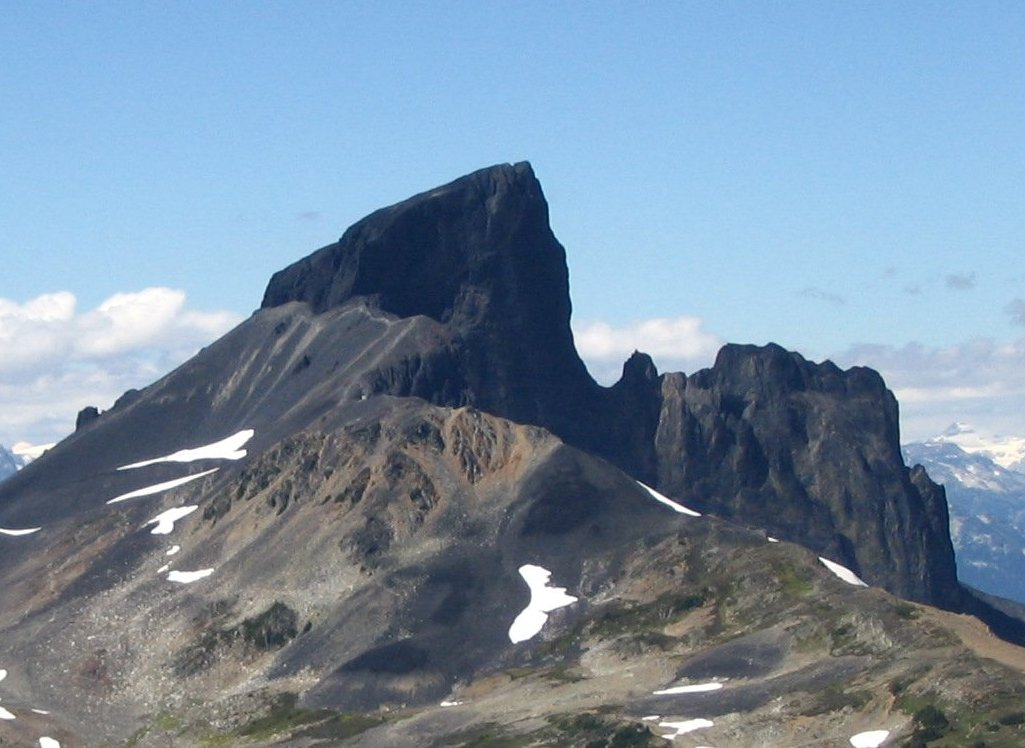
The Black Tusk viewed from the southeast

Mount Price, west of Garibaldi Lake, 5 km (3.1 mi) south of The Black Tusk, was formed in three stages of activity, dating back 1.1 million years, the latest of which produced two large lava flows from Clinker Peak during the early Holocene that ponded against the retreating continental ice sheet and formed The Barrier, containing Garibaldi Lake.

The Table is a steep-sided andesite tuya, situated approximately 3 km southwest of Mount Price and south of Garibaldi Lake. It rises 305 meters above glaciated basement rocks. The tuya formed by effusion of flatlying flows within erratics on its summit and lack of erosional features attributable to glacial suggest that The Table was also formed during the early Holocene.

Clinker Peak is a stratovolcano on the west shoulder of Mount Price on the west side of Garibaldi Lake. It has produced two large lava flows about 9,000 years ago.

Mount Brew is a subglacial mound, which last erupted during the Pleistocene.

== Hazards ==
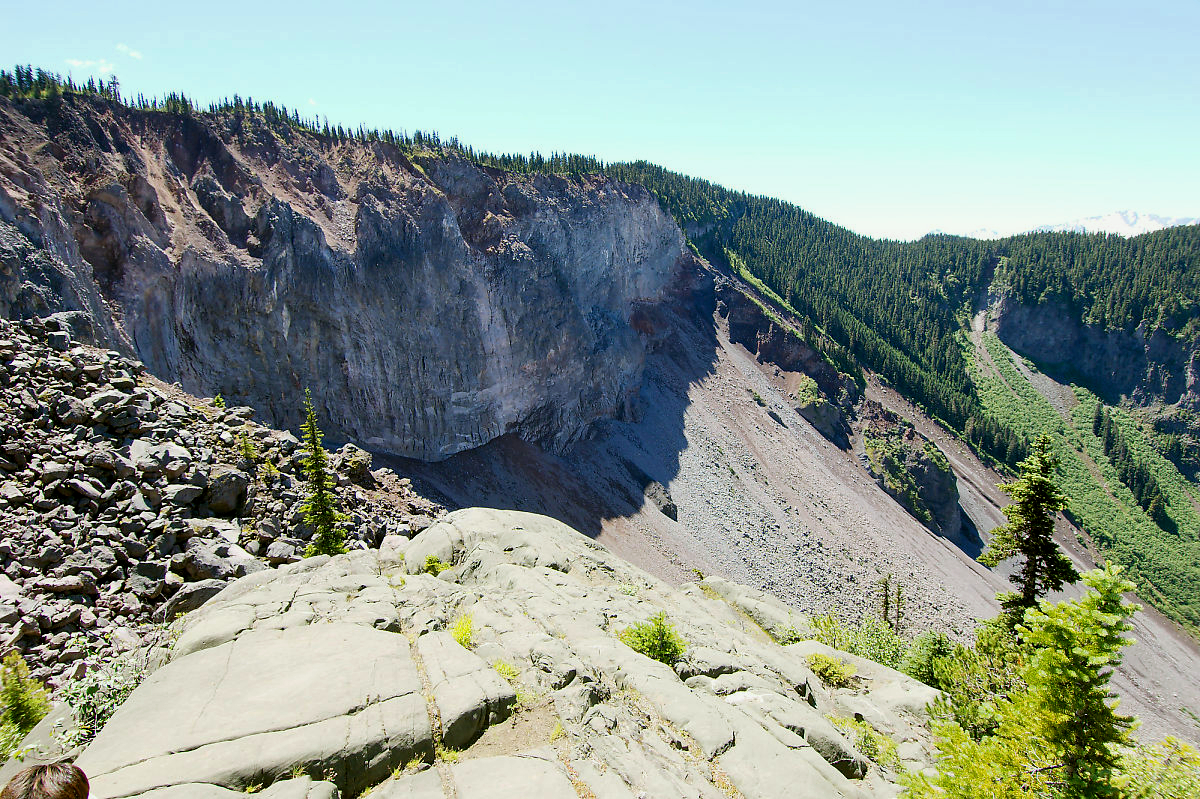
The Rock fall area and the edge of The Barrier

Future eruptions within the region could endanger the municipalities of Whistler and Squamish. Even though no Plinian eruptions are recognized, even Peléan eruptions may possibly create large amounts of volcanic ash that will possibly affect these close by villages. Ash columns from the volcanoes might rise hundreds of metres and could make this a serious hazard for air traffic.

The unstable lava formation of The Barrier has in the past unleashed several debris flows in the area below the lake, most recently in 1855–56 forming a large boulder field which gives Rubble Creek its name. Concerns about the Barrier's instability due to volcanic, tectonic, or heavy rainfall activity prompted the provincial government to declare the area immediately below it unsafe for human habitation in 1981. This led to the evacuation of the nearby village of Garibaldi, and the relocation of residents to new recreational subdivisions away from the hazard zone. Should the Barrier completely collapse, Garibaldi Lake would be entirely released and downstream damage in the Cheakamus and Squamish Rivers would be considerable, including major damage to the town of Squamish and possibly an impact wave on the waters of Howe Sound that would reach Vancouver Island.

== See also ==
- List of volcanoes in Canada
- List of volcanic fields
- Cascade Volcanic Arc
- Garibaldi Volcanic Belt
- Garibaldi Lake
