= Ice-marginal lava flow =

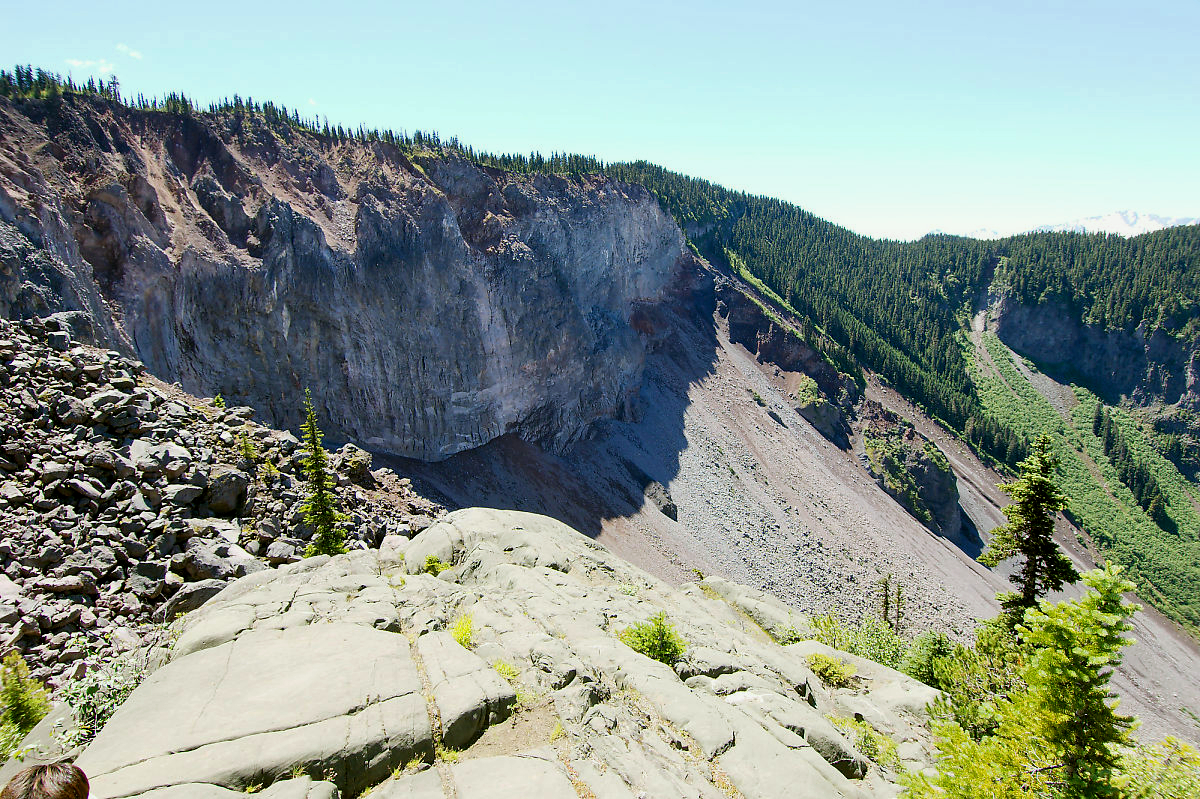
The Barrier, a typical ice-marginal lava flow in the Garibaldi Volcanic Belt of southwestern British Columbia, Canada.

An ice-marginal lava flow is a lava flow that comes into direct contact with a glacier or the margins of a large ice sheet. As the lava reaches the margins of an ice sheet, the front of the lava flow cools very quickly to form a barrier. Behind this barrier, the lava begins to pool, ceasing the contact between the hot lava and cold ice. The barrier is left behind as the ice retreats, leaving a thick lava front, which is in the form of a large, steep and unstable cliff face.

== Examples ==
=== The Barrier ===
The Barrier in British Columbia, Canada is a natural lava dam that formed when Mount Price produced a lava flow that travelled down the Rubble Creek valley and met the Cordilleran Ice Sheet about 13,000 years ago. Two lakes behind the lava dam, Garibaldi Lake and Lesser Garibaldi Lake, formed after meltwater pooled behind the lava flow wall. The vertical slabs of lava that make up The Barrier occasionally collapse to form massive rock avalanches that travel down the valley toward local residences. The biggest threat posed by The Barrier is a complete collapse of the lava dam due to volcanic activity or erosion. In the late 1800s, a debris flow from The Barrier created a large boulder field which gave Rubble Creek its name. Conditions are so unstable that the area directly below The Barrier is considered uninhabitable and dangerous to human life.

=== Hoodoo Mountain ===
A second example of ice-marginal lava flows can be found at Hoodoo Mountain, a flat-topped stratovolcano in British Columbia, Canada. The volcano contains 50 to 200 m (160 to 660 ft) high cliffs that formed as a result of lava erupting subglacially in the last 100,000 years. As lava poured down the slope, the lava came into contact with glacial ice that completely surrounded the volcano and cooled very quickly, forming a barrier around the entire volcano. Scientists are able to diagnose these lava cliff formations as a result of ice-marginal lava flows due to specific features such as the glassy texture of the lava and columnar jointing, which are evidence of fairly quick cooling of an erupted lava flow. The lava cooled, pooled and as the glacial ice receded, it left behind massive lava cliffs.

=== Mount Ruapehu ===
Mount Ruapehu, the tallest mountain on the North Island of New Zealand, is a massive stratovolcano that has also produced ice-marginal lava flows. These flows are a keystone in Ruapehu's history and are well exposed in the Wahainoa Lava Formation. They display characteristic columnar jointing and massively thick lava barriers. Scientists have determined through geochronology that between 15,000 and 51,000 years ago, the volcano erupted lava flows that came into contact with the surrounding valley floor glaciers and built up the enormous lava formations we see today. Using the eruption age and the ice-marginal lava flow data, scientists can gather when glaciers dominated Ruapehu, how high an elevation the glaciers reached, which was about 1,300 m (4,300 ft) above sea level, and can use glaciovolcanism as a proxy to reconstruct the paleoclimate of about 51,000–41,000 and 27,000–15,000 years ago.
