= Glaciovolcanism =

Volcanism related to glacial phenomena

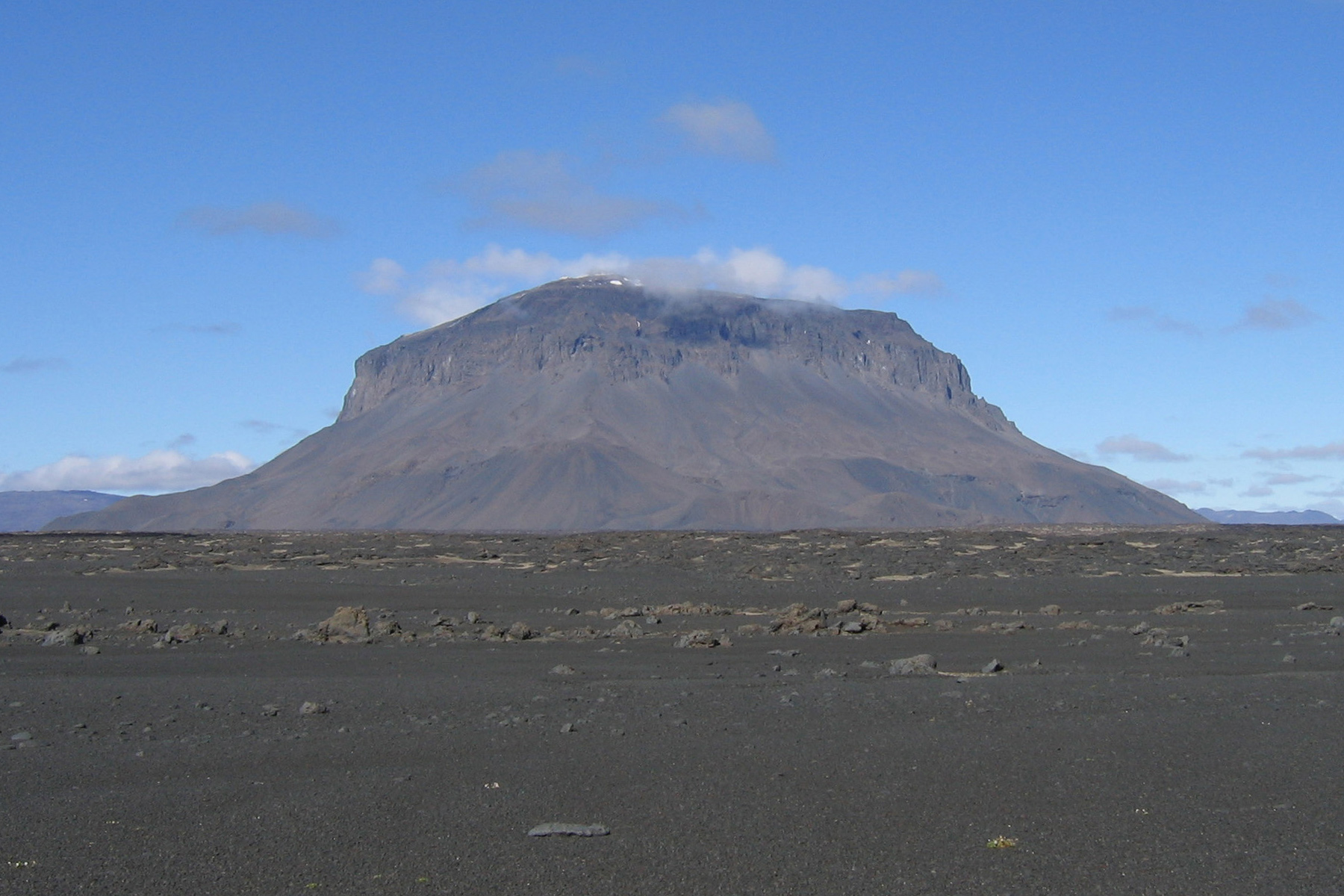
Tuya in Iceland

Glaciovolcanism is volcanism and related phenomena associated with glacial ice. The ice commonly constrains the erupted material and melts to create meltwater. Considerable melting of glacial ice can create massive lahars and glacial outburst floods known as jökulhlaups.

== General ==
Three forms of glaciovolcanism are known. Subglacial eruptions occur when a volcano erupts under ice. Such activity can produce landforms such as tuyas and subglacial mounds. Ice-marginal volcanism takes place when material from a subaerial eruption makes lateral contact with ice; ice-marginal lava flows are a product of this phenomenon. Supraglacial eruptions deposit ejecta onto the surface of an ice sheet.

World regions identified for possible glaciovolcanic activity include Alaska, and western parts of Canada, southern Chile, Argentina, Iceland, and a couple of regions along Antarctica's coast, such as the Antarctic Peninsula and the Ross Ice Shelf. Volcanologist Bill McGuire noted in 2014,

We see evidence of the Earth ‘waking up’ specifically in relation to seismic activity in areas of Alaska where dramatic ice loss (up to 1km vertical thickness) has occurred over the last 100 years, and also in relation to the correlation in many high mountains terrains of increased landslide occurrence and heatwaves. There is no unequivocal evidence for a specific volcanic response, unless the high level of recent activity at the Icelandic volcanoes is a reflection of unloading due to melting of the Vatnajökull Ice Cap. Certainly this whole region is uplifting by a few centimetres a year, so such a suggestion would not be completely unreasonable, even if we don’t (yet?) have any hard evidence.

== Examples ==
Isostatic rebound in response to glacier retreat (unloading), increase in local salinity (i.e., δ18Osw), have been attributed to increased volcanic activity at the onset of Bølling–Allerød, are associated with the interval of intense volcanic activity, hinting at an interaction between climate and volcanism - enhanced short-term melting of glaciers, possibly via albedo changes from particle fallout on glacier surfaces.

== See also ==
- Pine Island Glacier
