= Clinker Ridge =

Mountain ridge in southwestern British Columbia, Canada

Coordinates: 49.898°N 123.077°W

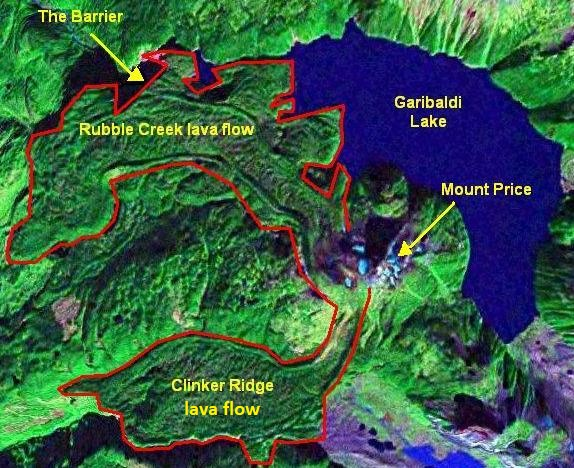
Clinker Ridge is the east-west trending ridge between the Rubble Creek and Clinker Ridge lava flows

Clinker Ridge is a mountain ridge in southwestern British Columbia, Canada, located between Garibaldi Lake and the Cheakamus River. It is the namesake of Clinker Peak on the western flank of Mount Price.

== See also ==
- Volcanism in Canada
