= The Table (British Columbia) =

Mountain in British Columbia, Canada

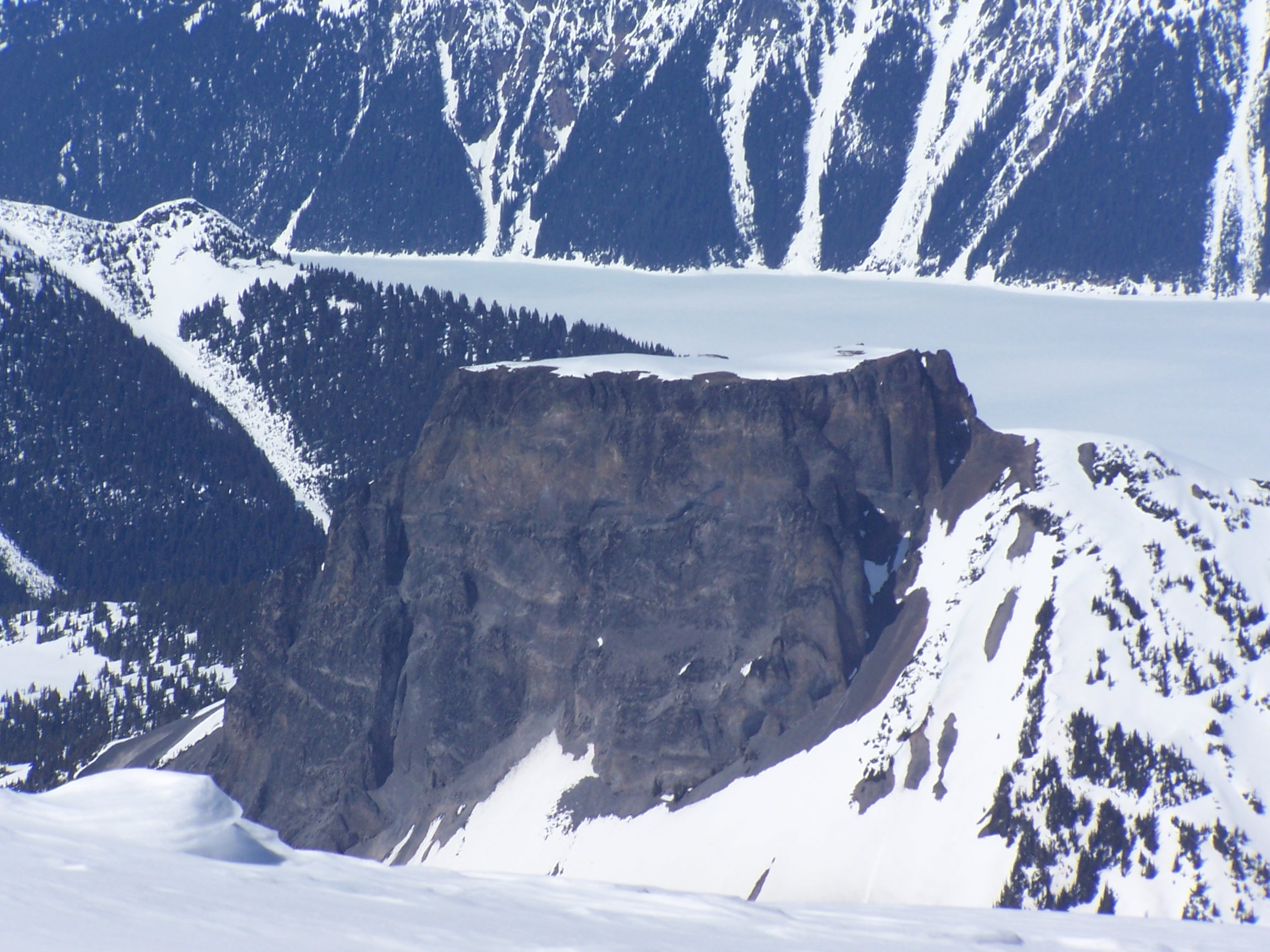
- The Table rises above the southwest side of Garibaldi Lake

Highest point
- Elevation: 2,021 m (6,631 ft)
- Prominence: 251 m (823 ft)
- Listing: Mountains of British Columbia
- Coordinates: 49°53′42″N 123°00′47″W

Geography
- Location within British Columbia Location within Canada
- Interactive map of The Table
- Location: British Columbia, Canada
- District: New Westminster Land District
- Parent range: Garibaldi Ranges
- Topo map: NTS 92G14 Cheakamus River

Geology
- Rock age: Holocene
- Mountain type: Tuya
- Volcanic arc: Canadian Cascade Arc
- Volcanic belt: Garibaldi Volcanic Belt
- Volcanic field: Garibaldi Lake volcanic field
- Last eruption: Holocene

Climbing
- First ascent: 1916 Tom Fyles

The Table, sometimes called Table Mountain, is a 2,021-metre (6,631 ft) high flow-dominated andesite tuya located 4 kilometres (2 mi) south of Garibaldi Lake, 15 kilometres (9 mi) northeast of Cheekye and 5 kilometres (3 mi) north of Mount Garibaldi, British Columbia, Canada. It rises over 530 metres (1,740 ft) above the surface of Garibaldi Lake, which lies less than 1 kilometre (1 mi) to the north.

The Table is almost impossible to climb because sections of the volcano have collapsed, creating steep and exceptionally rotten rock walls on all sides.

== Geology ==
The Table is part of the Garibaldi Lake volcanic field, a volcanic field that includes a group of nine small andesitic stratovolcanoes and basaltic andesite vents formed during the early Holocene. This in turn is part of the Garibaldi Volcanic Belt and of the Cascade Volcanic Arc that run from southwestern British Columbia to northern California caused by subduction of the Juan de Fuca Plate and Explorer Plate under the North American Plate at the Cascadia subduction zone.

Canadian geologist Bill Mathews proposed in 1951 that The Table formed when magma intruded into and melted a vertical tube in the overlying Cordilleran Ice Sheet. The partially molten mass of hornblende-phyric andesite cooled as a large block, with gravity flattening its upper surface. Horizontal columns occur at numerous locations along the periphery of the mass. The absence of glacial erosion of the tuya suggests that it erupted during the early Holocene, just prior to the disappearance of the ice sheet. Similar formations can be found in the Wells Gray-Clearwater volcanic field, the Northern Cordilleran Volcanic Province and elsewhere in the Garibaldi Volcanic Belt.

== In Film ==
The Table is featured in Agent Cody Banks and in Stargate: The Ark of Truth in which it is the site of the village where the Ark was hidden. The title sequence of the film features The Table, with a graphics overlay of the village superimposed on it, as well as an aerial tour of the Mount Garibaldi and Tantalus Range area.

== Gallery ==
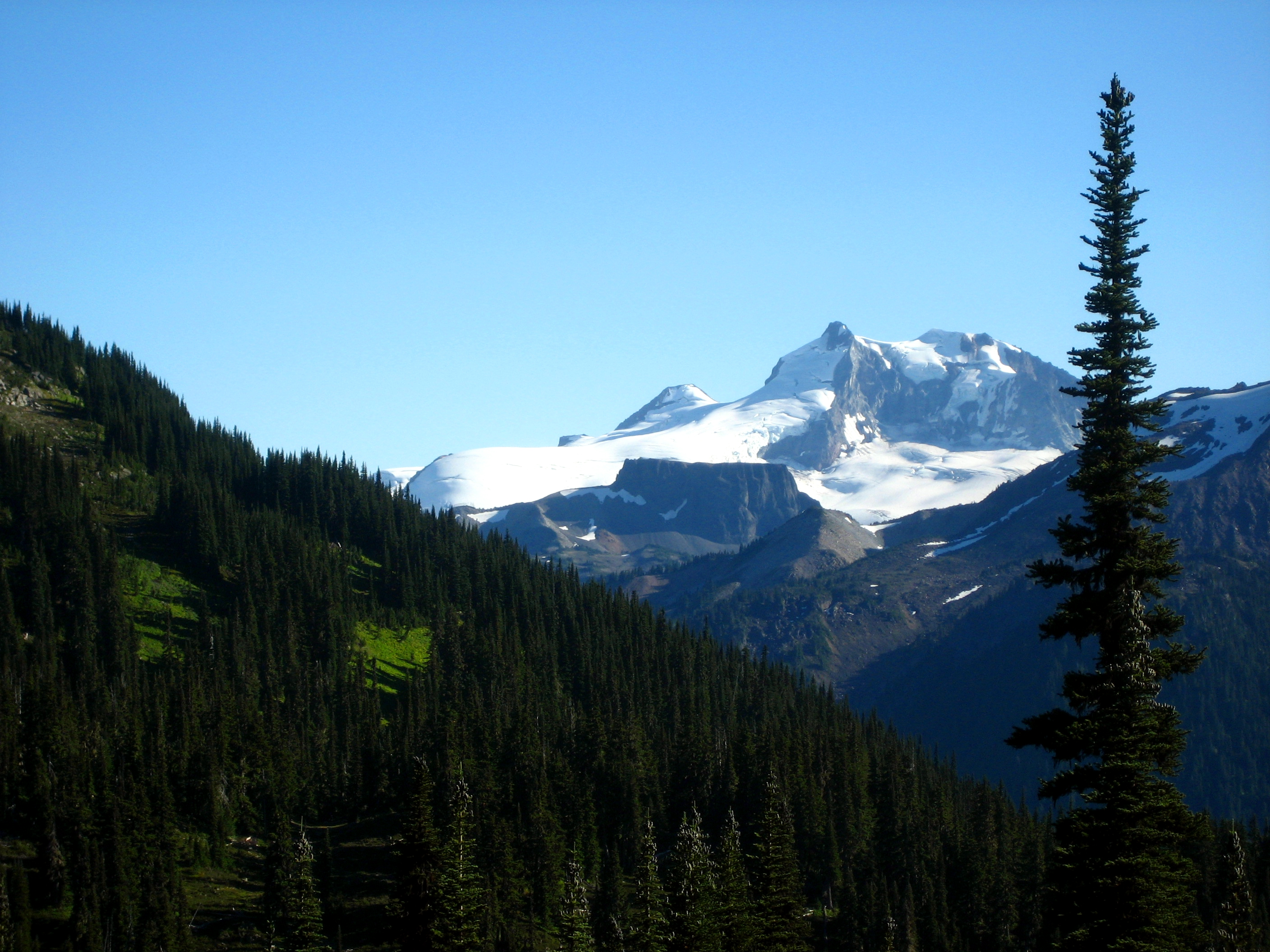
The Table as seen from Black Tusk Meadows

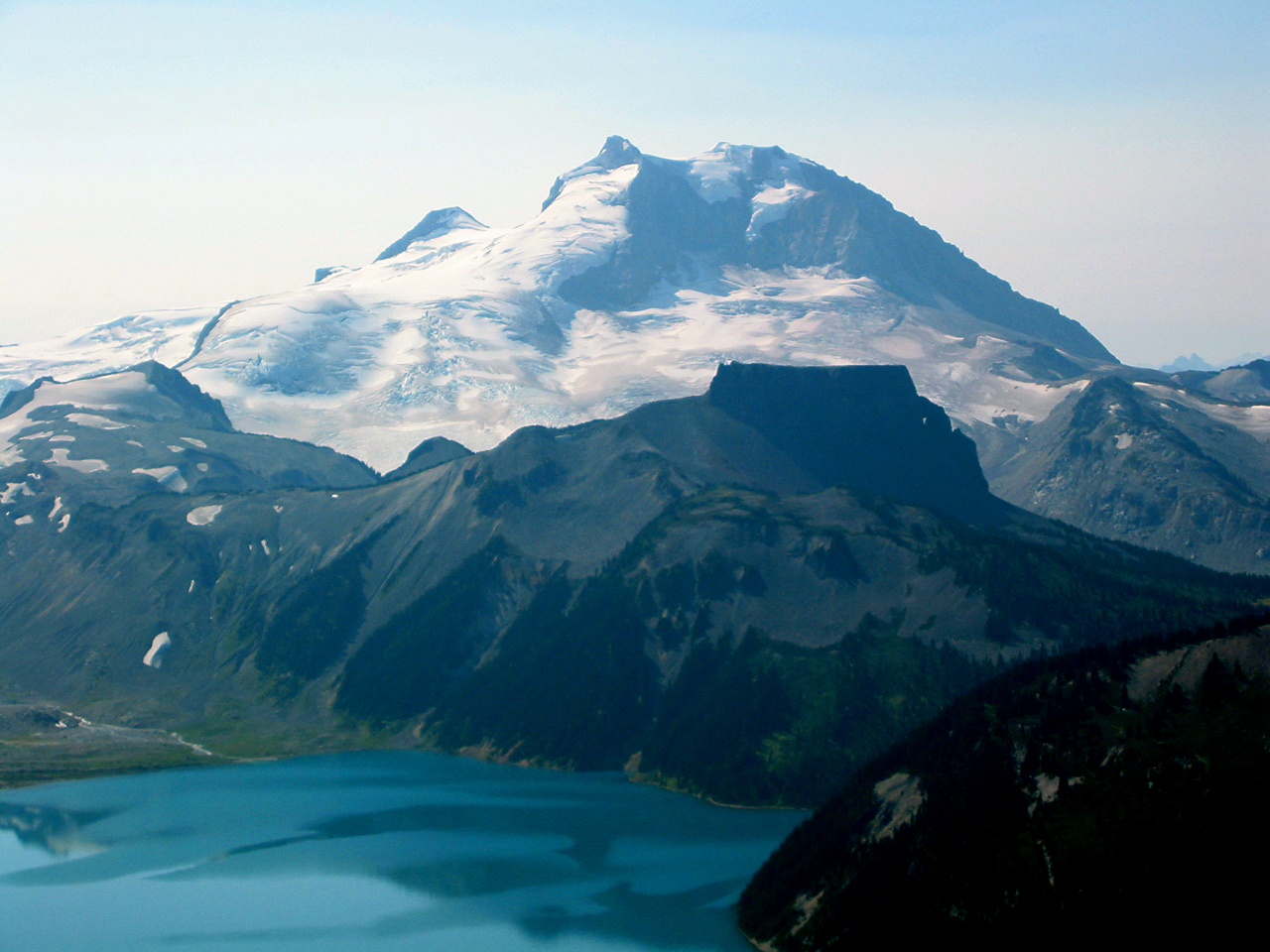
The north face of Mount Garibaldi rises above The Table and Garibaldi Lake

== See also ==
- Cascade Volcanoes
- Garibaldi Volcanic Belt
- List of volcanoes in Canada
- Volcanism of Canada
- Volcanism of Western Canada
