= The Black Tusk =

Mountain in British Columbia, Canada

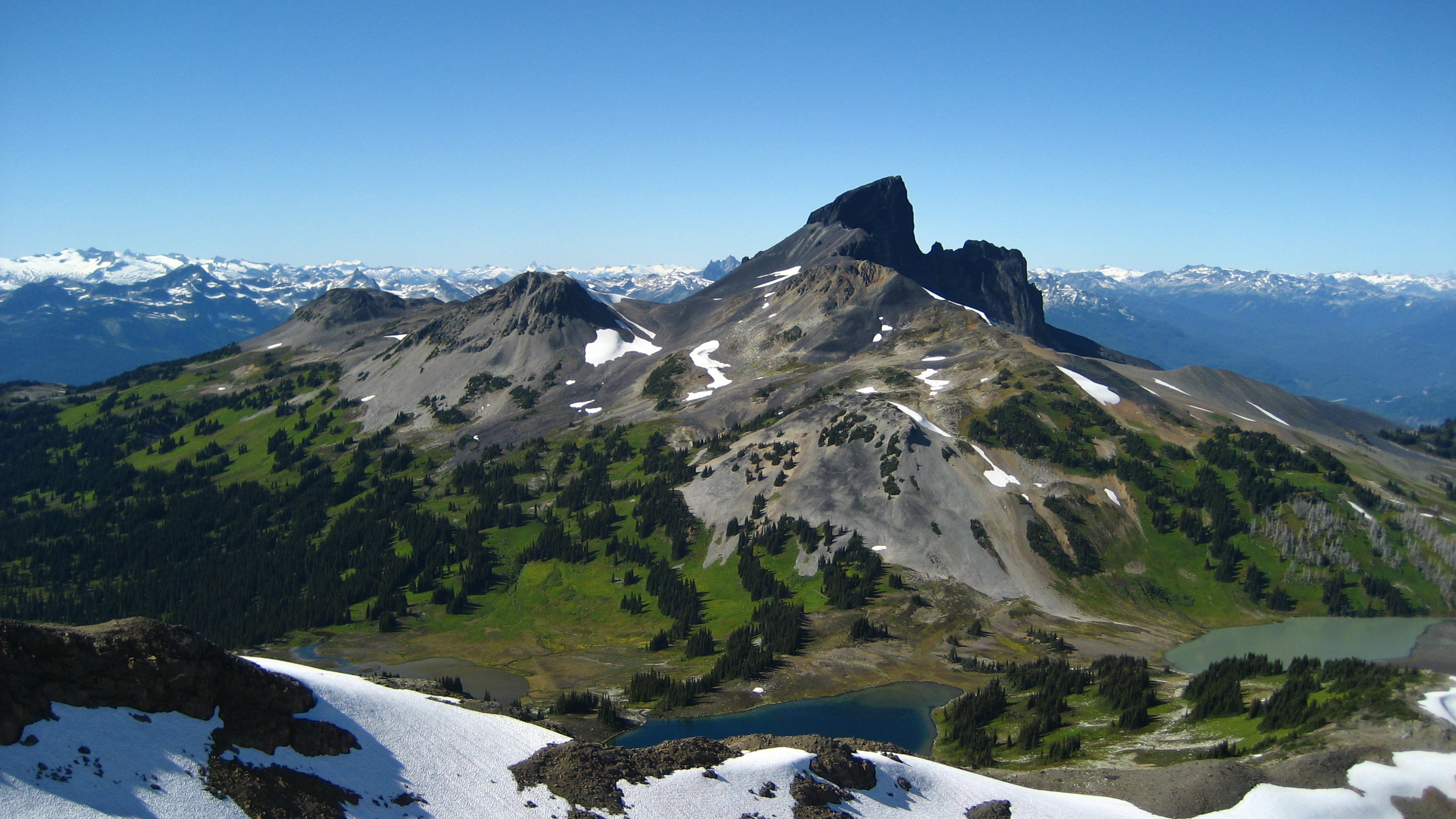
- The Black Tusk viewed from the southeast

Highest point
- Elevation: 2,319 m (7,608 ft)
- Prominence: 569 m (1,867 ft)
- Listing: Mountains of British Columbia
- Coordinates: 49°58′31″N 123°02′34″W

Geography
- Location within British Columbia
- Interactive map of The Black Tusk
- Country: Canada
- Province: British Columbia
- District: New Westminster Land District
- Protected area: Garibaldi Provincial Park
- Parent range: Garibaldi Ranges
- Topo map: NTS 92G14 Cheakamus River

Geology
- Rock age: Pleistocene
- Mountain type: Stratovolcano
- Volcanic arc: Canadian Cascade Arc
- Volcanic belt: Garibaldi Volcanic Belt
- Volcanic field: Garibaldi Lake volcanic field
- Last eruption: Pleistocene

Climbing
- First ascent: 1912 by William J. Gray and party
- Easiest route: Exposed rock scramble

The Black Tusk, known as Q̓elqámtensa ti Skenknápa in the St'at'imcets (Lillooet) language and as T'ákt'akmúten tl'a Ín7inyáx̱a7en in the Sḵwx̱wú7mesh (Squamish) language, is a stratovolcano and a pinnacle of volcanic rock in Garibaldi Provincial Park of British Columbia, Canada. At 2,319 m (7,608 ft) above sea level, the upper spire is visible from a great distance in all directions. It is particularly noticeable from the Sea-to-Sky Highway just south of Whistler, British Columbia. Distinctive and immediately identifiable, The Black Tusk is among the best known mountains in the Garibaldi Ranges of the Coast Mountains. The volcano is part of the Garibaldi Volcanic Belt which is a segment of the Canadian Cascade Arc, but it is not within the geographic boundary of the Cascade Range.

== Indigenous ==
The mountain traditionally is part of the border line between the Squamish and Lil'wat nations. To the Squamish people, this mountain is known as T'ákt'akmúten tl'a Ín7inyáx̱a7en, which means "Landing Place of the Thunderbird", speaking of the supernatural Ín7inyáx̱a7en or Thunderbird. The jagged shape of the mountain and its black colouring are said to come from the Thunderbird's lightning. The same is true for Mount Cayley, another stratovolcano farther north.

== Geology ==
The Black Tusk is considered to be the remnant of an extinct andesitic stratovolcano which formed between about 1.3 and 1.1 million years ago. Following glacial dissection, renewed volcanism produced the lava dome and flow forming its summit about 170,000 years ago. According to Natural Resources Canada, The Black Tusk was "perhaps the conduit for lava within a cinder-rich volcano. The loose cinder has eroded, leaving only the hard lava core." The exposed lava rock of the core is loose and friable. It is also black, giving the mountain its name and character. Cinder Cone, to the east of The Black Tusk, produced a 9 km (6 mi) long lava flow during the late Pleistocene or early Holocene.

The mountain currently hosts two significant glaciers, in large cirques carved into the northeastern and northwestern flanks of the broad cone below the lava pinnacle. Both glaciers start from about 2,100 m (6,890 ft) and flow northwards to below 1,800 m (5,906 ft). The glaciers are heavily covered in rocky debris due to the crumbling nature of the Tusk's rock.

The Black Tusk is a member of the chain of volcanic peaks that run from southwestern British Columbia to northern California. The peaks formed in the past 35 million years as the Juan de Fuca, Gorda and Explorer plates to its west have been subducting under the North American Plate at the Cascadia subduction zone.

== Recreation ==
The Black Tusk's lower flanks and south summit are a popular backcountry hiking and scrambling destination. Most hikers approach from the Taylor Meadows campground to the south near Garibaldi Lake, although there is a second route from the north that travels by way of Helm Lake.

The upper summit area at the top of the lava column can only be reached by scrambling up a short but exposed rock chimney to reach the south summit. The true summit, only about a metre higher, lies just to the north across a precipitous drop. It is rarely climbed, requiring a rappel of about 10 m (33 ft) into a notch followed by a loose and dangerous reascent up the crumbling lava. On the northern side of the north summit stands an isolated and intimidating rock formation known as the "Bishop's Mitre", which is rumoured to be unclimbed.

== Gallery ==
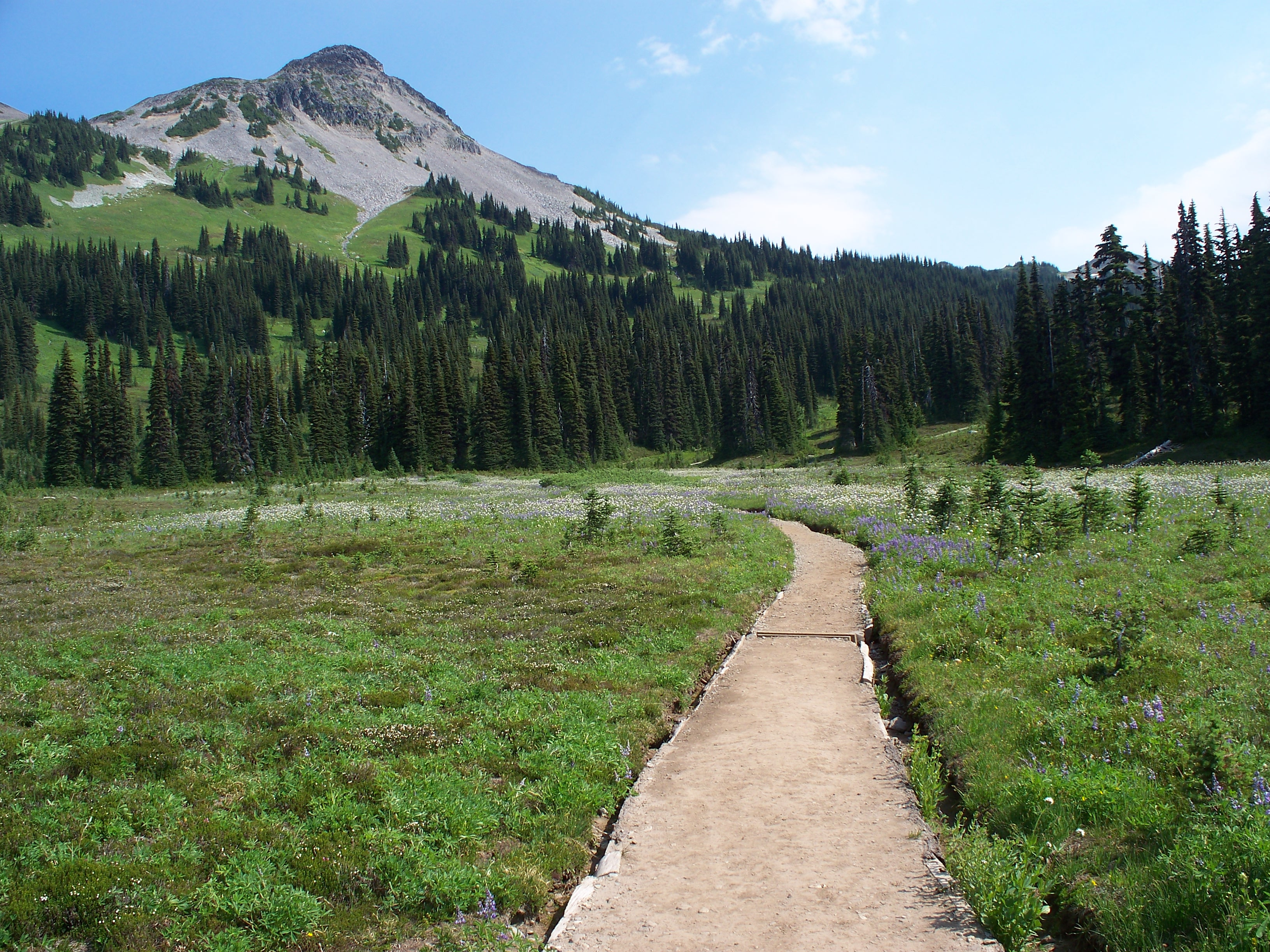
Part of the trail from Garibaldi Lake to The Black Tusk.

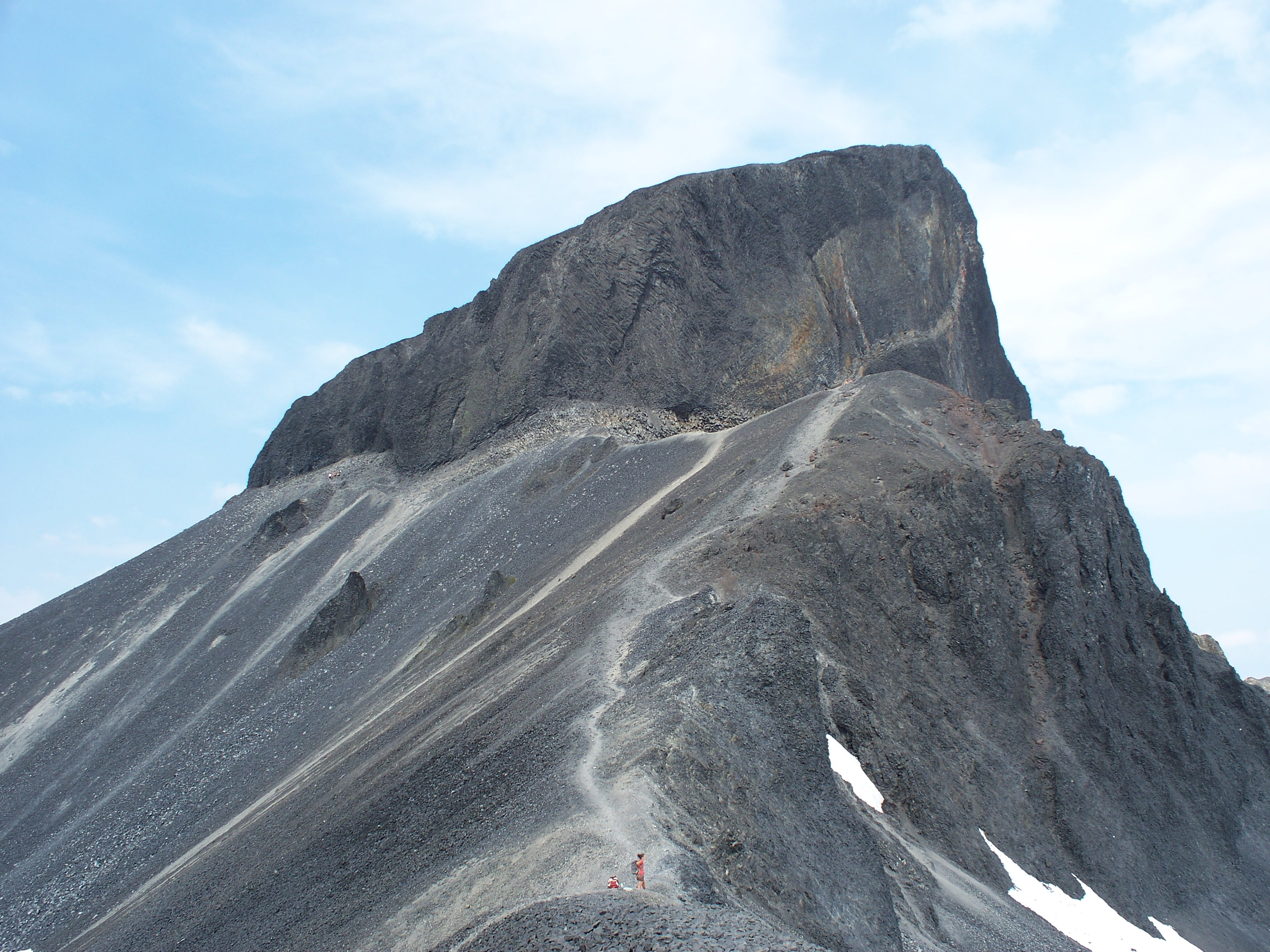
Close-up view of The Black Tusk.

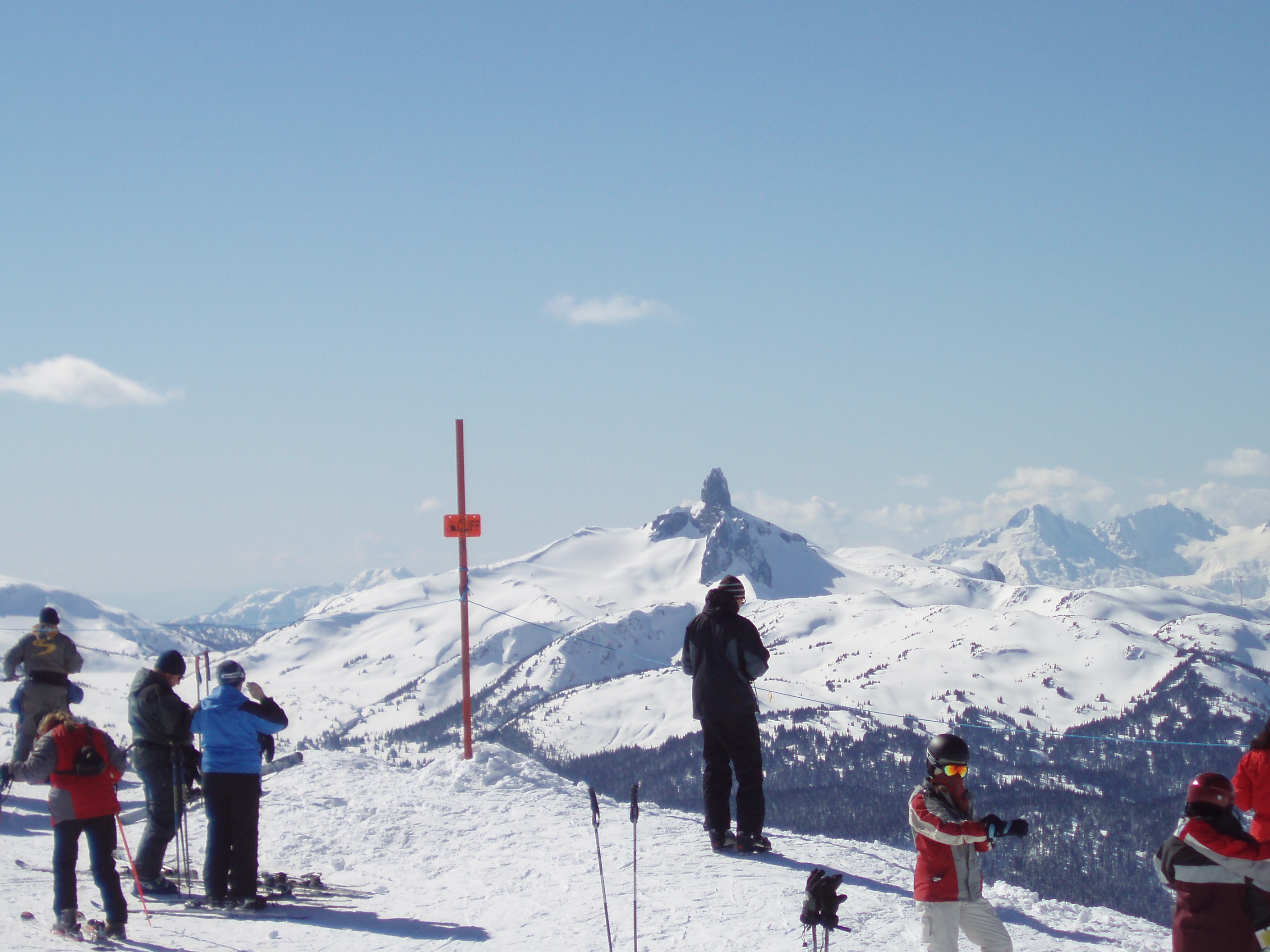
The Black Tusk as seen from the top of the Peak Express at Whistler Blackcomb

== See also ==
- Cascade Volcanoes
- Garibaldi Volcanic Belt
- List of volcanoes in Canada
- Volcanism of Canada
- Volcanism of Western Canada
