= Cinder Cone (British Columbia) =

Mountain in Canada

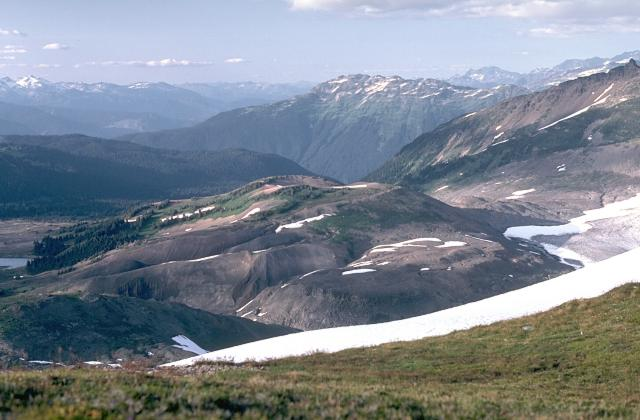

Highest point
- Elevation: 1,910 m (6,270 ft)
- Prominence: 120 m (390 ft)
- Coordinates: 49°58′18″N 123°00′25″W

Geography
- Location within British Columbia
- Location in Garibaldi Provincial Park
- Location: British Columbia, Canada
- District: New Westminster Land District
- Parent range: Garibaldi Ranges
- Topo map: NTS 92G14 Cheakamus River

Geology
- Rock age: Holocene
- Mountain type: Cinder cone
- Volcanic arc: Cascade Volcanic Arc
- Volcanic belt: Garibaldi Volcanic Belt
- Volcanic field: Garibaldi Lake volcanic field
- Last eruption: Holocene

Cinder Cone is a cinder cone with a small crater on the west side of the Helm Glacier in Garibaldi Provincial Park in British Columbia, Canada. Cinder Cone is surrounded by cinder flats and its crater is filled with meltwater during the summer. Cinder Cone is eroded easily by meltwater during the spring, washing the pyroclastics into the Valley of Desolation. Cinder Cone produced a 9 km (6 mi) long lava flow during the early Holocene.

== Gallery ==
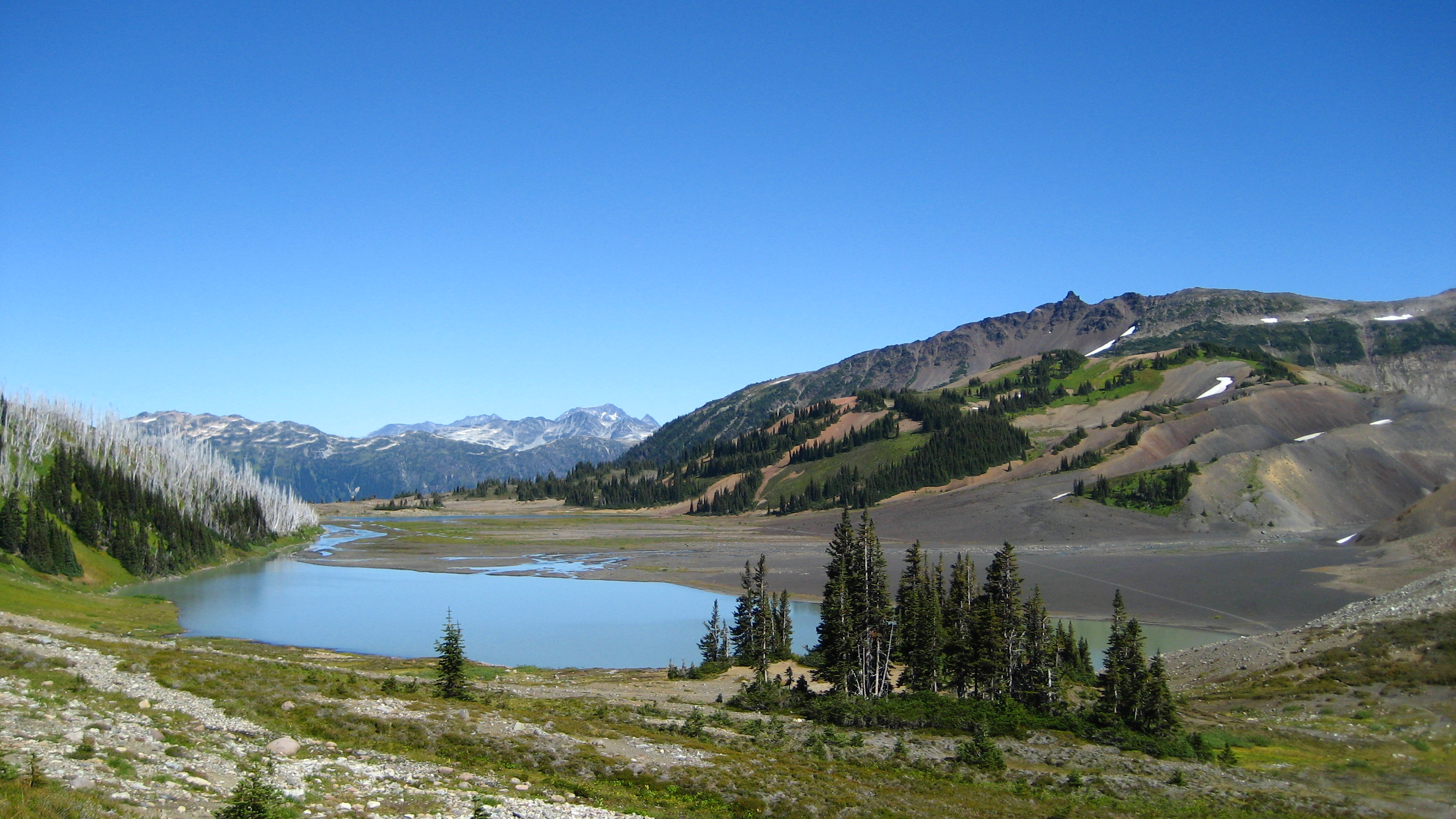

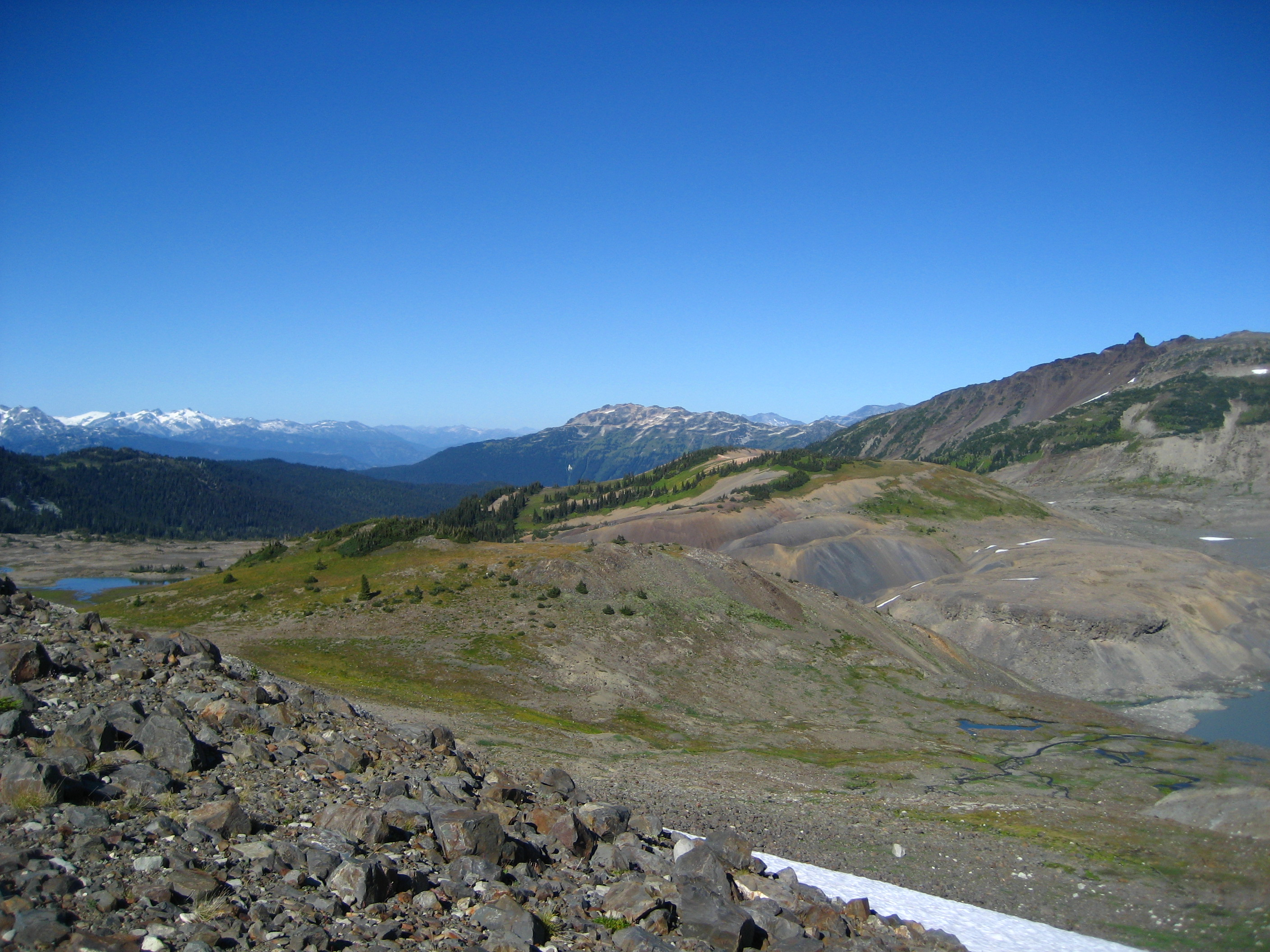

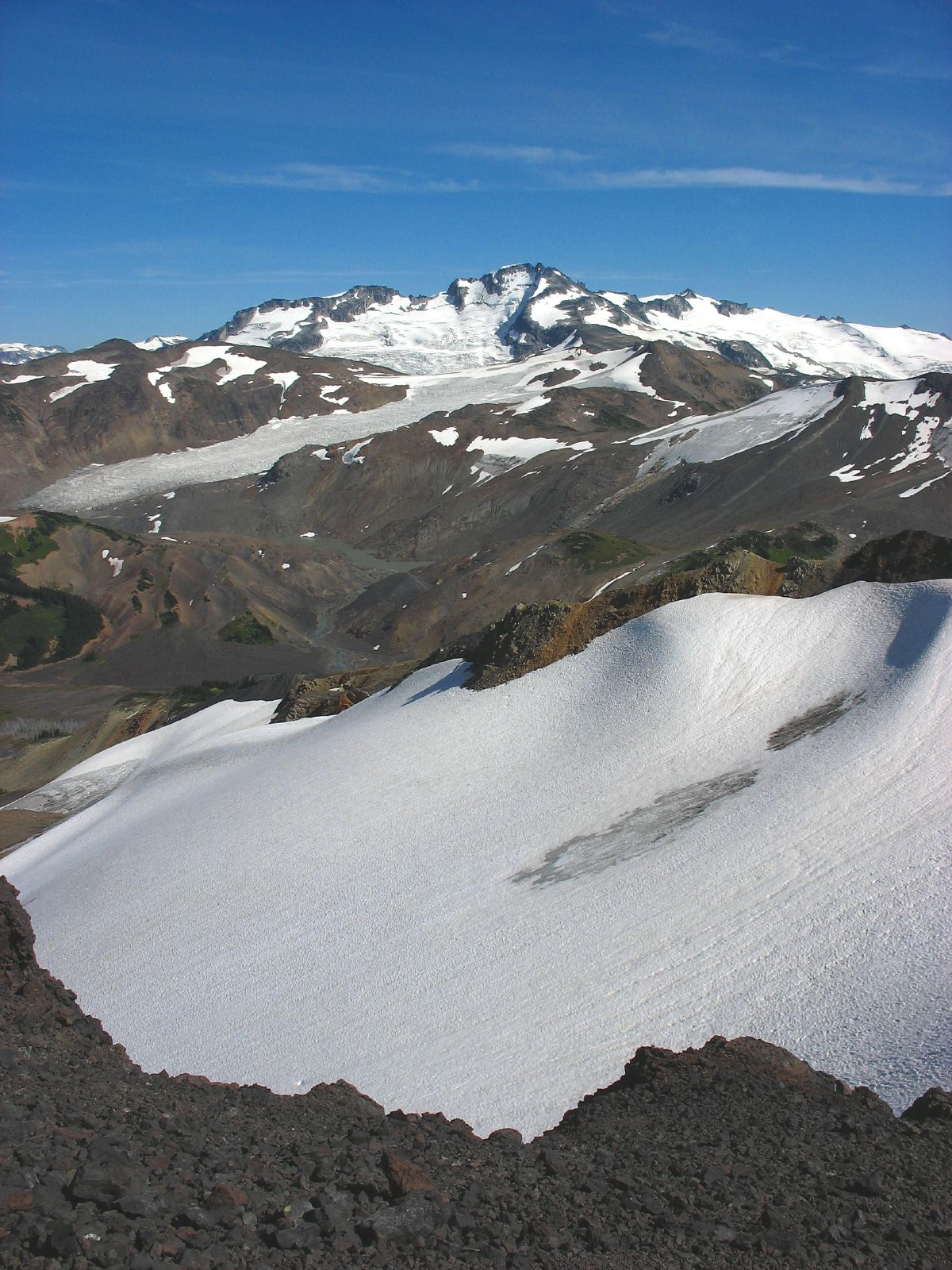
Cinder Cone and Helm Glacier

== See also ==
- List of Cascade volcanoes
- List of volcanoes of Canada
- Volcanism of Western Canada
