= Back River volcanic complex =

Archean stratovolcano

Coordinates: 65°N 108°W

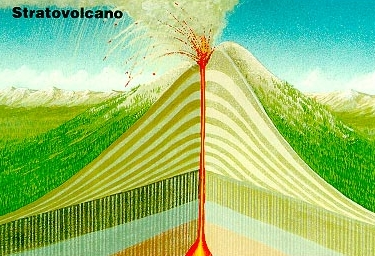
A cutaway diagram of a stratovolcano

The Back River volcanic complex is an Archean stratovolcano spanning the Northwest Territories–Nunavut border in Northern Canada. It is located 480 kilometres (298 mi) northwest of Yellowknife and to the northwest of the Back River from which it takes its name. The volcano constitutes the Back Group of the Yellowknife Supergroup and is somewhat anomalous in the Slave craton because it has undergone only a low degree of deformation and is subhorizontal. The southern half of the complex is exposed at the crest of a small dome. This is the eroded portion of the stratovolcano that has been preserved in an upright position. The complex comprises four volcanic sedimentary sequences (Innerring, Thlewyco, Boucher-Regan, Kelsh) that correspond to the phases of growth and destruction of this stratovolcano.

== Innerring ==
The Innerring sequence, which constitutes the oldest rocks of the complex, represents the upper part of an eroded early phase of the volcano (U-Pb zircon igneous age of 2.708 Gigaannum (Ga)).

== Thlewyco ==
The Thlewyco sequence represents the main construction phase of the volcano and forms an outward dipping, annular succession around the Innerring sequence, with an aggregate thickness of 2,500 metres (8,200 ft)-5,000 m (16,000 ft). Its stratigraphy changes dramatically around the crater, varying from five cycles of andesitic and rhylotic lava, followed by succession of volcanistic debris on the north side, to 30 subaerial andesitic flows and rare pyroclastic and epivolcaniclastic units on the eastern side, to interlayered dacitic and andesitic lava and tuff overlain by a thick succession of voluminous, nonwelded, ash-flow tuff and volcaniclastic rocks on the south side. Volcanism in this sequence ended with the eruption of large rhyolite and dacite dome-flow complexes (U-Pb zircon dated at 2.692 Ga). The Innerring and Thlewycho sequences represent a complex history of explosive eruptions from numerous eruptive centers.

== Boucher-Regan ==
The Boucher-Regan sequence, with its predominance of pillowed lava flows, suggests that this northern flank of the volcano was submerged during deposition.

== Kelsh ==
The Kelsh sequence on the northwestern side comprises epiclastic volcarenite, rhyolite-dacite block breccia from lava domes, polymict breccia, and a conglomerate of andesite, dacite-rhyolite clasts, and andesitic tuff. The exposed succession consists of iron-formation, oolitic-stromatolitic carbonate, sulphidic volcaniclastic rocks and graphitic slate that marks the end of volcanism. The Kelsh sequence forms a broad apron that is interpreted as a shallow, submarine to subaerial, clastic fan derived by degradation of the volcanic pile (U-Pb zircon dated at 2.586 Ga).

== Age ==
Age determinations in the Black River complex are similar to the ages of volcanic rock found in the upper Kam Group of the Yellowknife greenstone belt as well as other volcanic centers in the western Slave province. Detrital zircon geochronology on turbiditic sequences confirm a secondary deposition of turbidite units at ca. 2.62-2.60 Ga that was widespread throughout the Slave province.

== See also ==
- Volcanism of Canada
- Volcanism of Northern Canada
- List of volcanoes in Canada
