= Felsite Peak =

Volcanic outcrop in Canada

Highest point
- Elevation: 2,530 m (8,300 ft)
- Prominence: 670 m (2,200 ft)
- Coordinates: 60°32′58.2″N 138°27′33.5″W

Geography
- Location: Yukon, Canada
- Parent range: Wrangell Volcanic Field, Coast Mountains
- Topo map: NTS 115B9 Airdrop Lake

Geology
- Rock age: Pliocene
- Mountain type: Outcrop
- Last eruption: Pliocene

Felsite Peak is an eroded volcanic outcrop in the Wrangell Volcanic Field, Yukon Territory, Canada, located 54 km south of Silver City, 8 km southwest of Snowshoe Peak and 30 km east of Pinnacle Peak. Felsite Peak was named after Felsite Creek and has a triple summit on the east side of the Disappointment Glacier and at the head of Felsite Creek.

It formed as a result of melting of the crust, due to subduction of the Pacific Plate beneath the North American Plate and last erupted during the Pliocene. Like most volcanoes in the Yukon, it is part of the Pacific Ring of Fire, that includes over 160 active volcanoes.

== See also ==
- Wrangell Volcanic Field
- List of volcanoes in Canada
- Volcanism in Canada
