= K19 =

K19 may refer to:

- K-19 (Kansas highway)
- K-19: The Widowmaker, an American historical drama film
- K19 pipe, a diatreme in Northern Alberta, Canada
- Albany Municipal Airport (Missouri)
- Keratin 19, a human protein
- Soviet submarine K-19, a Soviet submarine
- Symphony No. 4 (Mozart), listed K.19 in the Kochel catalogue
