= Rabbit Mountain =

Volcanic outcrop in Canada

- Location within Yukon

Highest point
- Elevation: 2,090 m (6,860 ft)
- Prominence: 245 m (804 ft)
- Coordinates: 61°51′03″N 140°57′43″W

Geography
- Location: Yukon, Canada
- Parent range: Wrangell Volcanic Field, Nutzotin Mountains
- Topo map: NTS 115F15 Canyon Mountain

Geology
- Rock age: Pliocene
- Mountain type: Outcrop
- Last eruption: Pliocene

Climbing
- Easiest route: mining road

Rabbit Mountain is an eroded volcanic outcrop in the Wrangell Volcanic Field, Yukon Territory, Canada, located 30 km southwest of Koidern and 4 km northwest of Canyon Mountain. It is east of the Yukon-Alaska boundary and can be accessed by old mining roads that reach Rabbit Creek. Rabbit Mountain formed as a result of melting of the crust, due to subduction of the Pacific Plate beneath the North American Plate and last erupted during the Pliocene. Like most volcanoes in the Yukon, Rabbit Mountain is part of the Pacific Ring of Fire, that includes over 160 active volcanoes.

== See also ==
- Wrangell Volcanic Field
- List of volcanoes in Canada
- Volcanism in Canada
