= K252 =

K252 or K-252 may refer to:

- K-252 (Kansas highway), a state highway in Kansas
- K252a, an alkaloid isolated from Nocardiopsis bacteria
- K252 pipe, a diamondiferous diatreme in Canada
- Soviet submarine K-252, a former Yankee-class submarine, in service 1971-1989
