= Graham Seamount =

Underwater volcano in the Pacific off Haida Gwaii, British Columbia, Canada

- Location within British Columbia
- Summit depth: 1,474 m (4,836 ft)

Location
- Location: North Pacific Ocean
- Coordinates: 53°14′N 134°31′W
- Country: Canada

Geology
- Type: Submarine volcano

The Graham Seamount is a seamount located in the Pacific Ocean off the coast of Haida Gwaii, British Columbia, Canada.

== See also ==
- Volcanology of Canada
- Volcanology of Western Canada
- List of volcanoes in Canada
