= Seminole Seamount =

Seamount off the coast of British Columbia, Canada

- Location within British Columbia
- Summit depth: 1,653 m (5,423 ft)

Location
- Location: North Pacific Ocean
- Coordinates: 49°46′N 129°50′W
- Country: Canada

Geology
- Type: Submarine volcano

The Seminole Seamount is a seamount located in the Pacific Ocean off the coast of northern Vancouver Island, British Columbia, Canada.

== See also ==
- Volcanism of Canada
- Volcanism of Western Canada
- List of volcanoes in Canada
