= Heck Seamount =

Underwater volcano in the Pacific

- Location within British Columbia
- Summit depth: 1,320 m (4,331 ft)

Location
- Location: North Pacific Ocean
- Coordinates: 48°30′N 130°00′W
- Country: Canada

Geology
- Type: Submarine volcano

The Heck Seamount is a seamount located in the Pacific Ocean off the coast of central Vancouver Island, British Columbia, Canada.

== See also ==
- Volcanism of Canada
- Volcanism of Western Canada
- List of volcanoes in Canada
