= Misery Kimberlite Complex =

Diatreme cluster in Canada

The Misery Kimberlite Complex is a diatreme cluster in the Northwest Territories of Northern Canada. It was formed approximately 56 million years ago by several overlapping explosive eruptions and intrusions. All seem to have been structurally controlled by zones of weakness related with faults, dikes and a major contact in the Archean basement. The complex is associated with a field of diamondiferous kimberlites called the Lac de Gras kimberlite field.

== See also ==
- List of volcanoes in Canada
- Volcanology of Canada
- Volcanology of Northern Canada
