= Flowers River caldera complex =

The Flowers River caldera complex is a caldera complex, located in eastern Labrador, Canada. The complex is made up of pyroclastic flow tuffs.

== See also ==
- Volcanism of Canada
- Volcanism of Eastern Canada
- List of volcanoes in Canada
