= Deadhorse Creek diatreme complex =

Diatreme complex in Ontario, Canada

The Deadhorse Creek diatreme complex is a diatreme complex in northwestern Ontario, Canada, located approximately 25 km (16 mi) west of Marathon. It is thought to have formed by the Midcontinent Rift System, a 2,000 km (1,243 mi) long rift in the centre of the North American continent that was active in the Mesoproterozoic.

== See also ==
- Volcanism of Canada
- Volcanism of Eastern Canada
- List of volcanoes in Canada
