= Lac des Vents volcanic complex =

Archean volcanic complex in the Abitibi greenstone belt of Quebec, Canada

Coordinates: 49.4991°N 74.8799°W

The Lac des Vents volcanic complex is a 2.3 km (1.4 mi) thick Archean volcanic complex in the Abitibi greenstone belt of Quebec, Canada. It is an important part of a major submarine volcanic structure.

== See also ==
- Volcanism of Canada
- List of volcanoes in Canada
