= Artemisia pipe =

Artemisia pipe is a diamond bearing diatreme in the Slave craton region of northern Northwest Territories, Canada.

== See also ==
- List of volcanoes in Canada
- Volcanism of Canada
- Volcanism of Northern Canada
