= HP diatreme =

Highest point
- Elevation: 2,400 m (7,900 ft)
- Listing: List of volcanoes in Canada
- Coordinates: 51°41′30″N 116°57′00″W

Geography
- Location: British Columbia, Canada
- Parent range: Rocky Mountains

Geology
- Mountain type: Diatreme

The HP diatreme, also called the HP pipe, is a diatreme in the Rocky Mountains of southeastern British Columbia, Canada, located 50 km (31 mi) northeast of Golden.

== See also ==
- Volcanology of Canada
- List of volcanoes in Canada
