= Mountain Diatreme =

Diatreme in the Northwest Territories, Canada

The Mountain Diatreme is a diatreme in the Northwest Territories, Canada, located 190 km (118 mi) southwest of Norman Wells. It has a diameter of 600 m (1,969 ft) and is one of the nearly 100 diatremes in the central Mackenzie Mountains.

== See also ==
- Volcanism of Canada
- Volcanism of Northern Canada
- List of volcanoes in Canada
