= Oshawa Seamount =

Pacific submarine volcano

- Location within British Columbia
- Summit depth: 2,127 m (6,978 ft)

Location
- Location: North Pacific Ocean
- Coordinates: 53°14′N 134°31′W
- Country: Canada

Geology
- Type: Submarine volcano

The Oshawa Seamount is a seamount located in the Pacific Ocean off the coast of Haida Gwaii (formerly known as the Queen Charlotte Islands), British Columbia, Canada.

== See also ==
- Volcanism of Canada
- Volcanism of Western Canada
- List of volcanoes in Canada
