= Mount Nansen (Yukon) =

Mountain in Yukon, Canada

- Location within Yukon

Highest point
- Elevation: 1,827 m (5,994 ft)
- Prominence: 532 m (1,745 ft)
- Parent peak: Victoria Mountain
- Coordinates: 62°06′22.3″N 137°18′10.1″W

Geography
- Location: Yukon, Canada
- Parent range: Dawson Range
- Topo map: NTS 115I3 Mount Nansen

Geology
- Rock age: Late Cretaceous
- Mountain type: Stratovolcano

Mount Nansen is a deeply eroded Mid-Cretaceous stratovolcano located 53 km (33 mi) west of Carmacks and 10 km (6.2 mi) west of Victoria Mountain in the central Yukon, Canada. It consists of rhyolite, dacite, andesite flows, breccias and tuff. Mount Nansen was formed during subducting under North America during the Mid-Cretaceous.

== See also ==
- List of volcanoes in Canada
- Volcanology of Canada
