= Ring of Fire =

Tectonic belt of earthquakes and volcanoes

The Pacific Ring of Fire, with trenches marked with blue lines

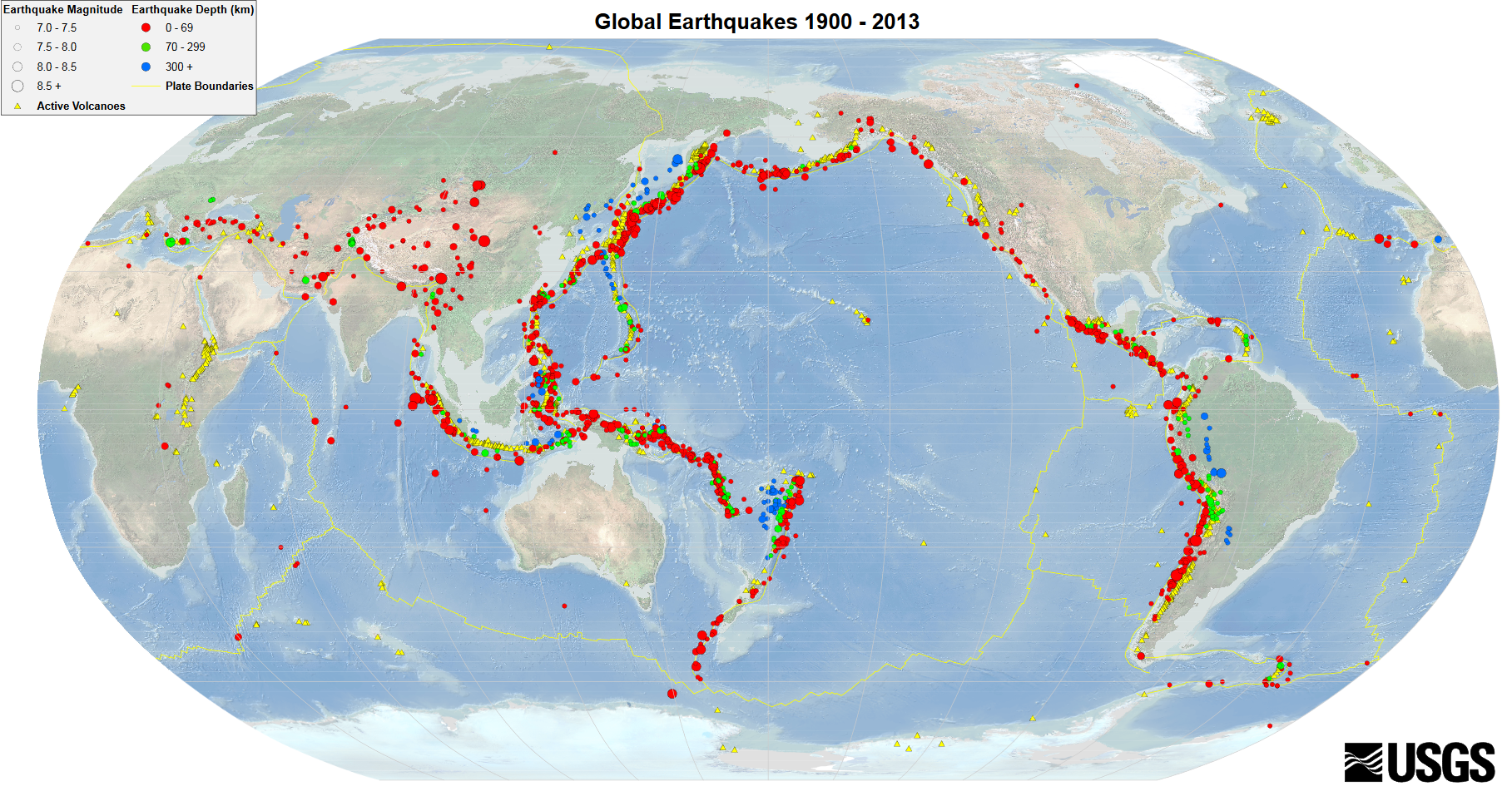
Global earthquakes (1900–2013) : Earthquakes of magnitude ≥ 7.0 (depth 0–69 km (0–43 mi)) : Active volcanoes

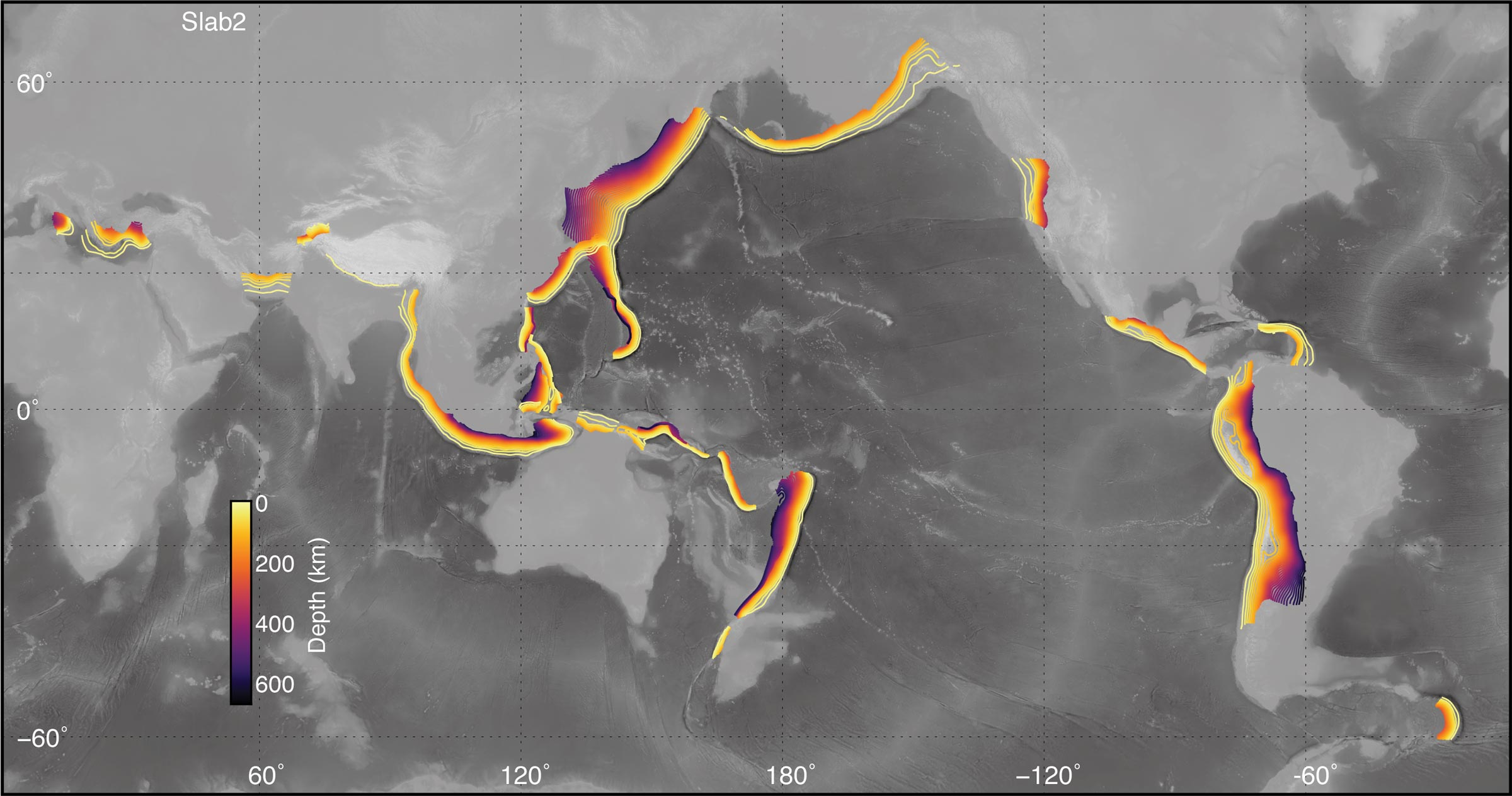
Global map of subduction zones, with subducted slabs contoured by depth

Diagram of the geological process of subduction

The Ring of Fire (also known as the Pacific Ring of Fire, the Rim of Fire, the Girdle of Fire or the Circum-Pacific belt) (Note: Spanish: cinturón de fuego del Pacífico, anillo de fuego del Pacífico; Malay: Lingkaran api Pasifik; Indonesian: Cincin Api Pasifik; Filipino: Singsing ng Apoy ng Pasipiko; Chinese: 环太平洋火山带 Huán Taìpíngyáng Huǒshān Daì; Russian: Тихоокеанское вулканическое огненное кольцо, romanized: Tikhookeanskoye vulkanicheskoye ognennoye kol'tso; Japanese: 環太平洋火山帯, romanized: Kantaiheiyō kazan-tai or 環太平洋造山帯 Kantaiheiyō zōzantai.) is a tectonic belt of earthquakes and volcanoes.

It is about 40,000 km (25,000 mi) long and up to about 500 km (310 mi) wide, and surrounds most of the Pacific Ocean.

The Ring of Fire contains between 750 and 915 active or dormant volcanoes, around two-thirds of the world total. The exact number of volcanoes within the Ring of Fire depends on which regions are included.

About 90% of the world's earthquakes, including most of its largest, occur within the belt.

The Ring of Fire is not a single geological structure. It was created by the subduction of different tectonic plates at convergent boundaries around the Pacific Ocean. These include the Antarctic, Nazca and Cocos plates subducting beneath the South American plate; the Pacific and Juan de Fuca plates beneath the North American plate; the Philippine plate beneath the Eurasian plate; and a complex boundary between the Pacific and Australian plate. The interactions at these plate boundaries have formed oceanic trenches, volcanic arcs, back-arc basins and volcanic belts. The inclusion of some areas in the Ring of Fire, such as the Antarctic Peninsula and western Indonesia, is disputed.

The Ring of Fire has existed for more than 35 million years. However, subduction has existed for much longer in some parts of the Ring; many older extinct volcanoes are located within the Ring. More than 350 of the Ring of Fire's volcanoes have been active in historical times, (Note: Macdonald (1972) listed 361 historically active volcanoes in the Ring of Fire (or 398 historically active volcanoes if the western islands of Indonesia are included).) while the four largest volcanic eruptions on Earth in the Holocene epoch all occurred at volcanoes in the Ring of Fire.

Most of Earth's active volcanoes with summits above sea level are located in the Ring of Fire. Many of these subaerial volcanoes are stratovolcanoes (e.g. Mount St. Helens), formed by explosive eruptions of tephra alternating with effusive eruptions of lava flows. Lavas at the Ring of Fire's stratovolcanoes are mainly andesite and basaltic andesite but dacite, rhyolite, basalt and some other rarer types also occur. Other types of volcano are also found in the Ring of Fire, such as subaerial shield volcanoes (e.g. Plosky Tolbachik), and submarine seamounts (e.g. Monowai).

== History ==
From Ancient Greek and Roman times until the late 18th century, volcanoes were associated with fire, based on the ancient belief that volcanoes were caused by fires burning within the Earth. This historical link between volcanoes and fire is preserved in the name of the Ring of Fire, despite the fact that volcanoes do not burn the Earth with fire.

The existence of an orogenic belt of volcanic activity around the Pacific Ocean was known in the early 19th century; for example, in 1825 the pioneering volcanologist G. P. Scrope described the chains of volcanoes around the Pacific Ocean's rim in his book Considerations on Volcanos [sic]. Three decades later, a book about the Perry Expedition to Japan commented on the Ring of Fire volcanoes as follows: "They [the Japanese Islands] are in the line of that immense circle of volcanic development which surrounds the shores of the Pacific from Tierra del Fuego around to the Moluccas." (Narrative of the Expedition of an American Squadron to the China Seas and Japan, 1852–54.) An article appeared in Scientific American in 1878 outlined the phenomenon of volcanic activity around the boundaries of the Pacific. Early explicit references to volcanoes forming a "ring of fire" around the Pacific Ocean also include Alexander P. Livingstone's book Complete Story of San Francisco's Terrible Calamity of Earthquake and Fire, published in 1906, in which he describes "... the great ring of fire which circles round the whole surface of the Pacific Ocean.".

In 1912, geologist Patrick Marshall introduced the term "Andesite Line" to mark a boundary between islands in the southwest Pacific, which differ in volcano structure and lava types. The concept was later extended to other parts of the Pacific Ocean. The Andesite Line and the Ring of Fire closely match in terms of location.

The development of the theory of plate tectonics since the early 1960s has provided the current understanding and explanation of the global distribution of volcanoes and earthquakes, including those in the Ring of Fire.

== Geographic boundaries ==
There is consensus among geologists about most of the regions which are included in the Ring of Fire. There are, however, a few regions on which there is no universal agreement. (See § Distribution of volcanoes). Indonesia lies at the intersection of the Ring of Fire and the Alpide belt (which is the Earth's other very long subduction-related volcanic and earthquake zone, also known as the Mediterranean–Indonesian volcanic belt, running east–west through southern Asia and southern Europe). Some geologists include all of Indonesia in the Ring of Fire; many geologists exclude Indonesia's western islands (which they include in the Alpide belt).

Some geologists include the Antarctic Peninsula and the South Shetland Islands in the Ring of Fire, other geologists exclude these areas. The rest of Antarctica is excluded because the volcanism there is not related to subduction.

The Ring of Fire does not extend across the southern Pacific Ocean from New Zealand to the Antarctic Peninsula or from New Zealand to the southern tip of South America because the submarine plate boundaries in this part of the Pacific Ocean (the Pacific–Antarctic Ridge, the East Pacific Rise and the Chile Ridge) are divergent instead of convergent. Although some volcanism occurs in this region, it is not related to subduction.

Some geologists include the Izu Islands, the Bonin Islands, and the Mariana Islands, other geologists exclude them.

=== Land areas ===
- Antarctica
  - Antarctic Peninsula
  - South Sandwich Islands
- Andes
  - Austral Volcanic Zone
  - South Volcanic Zone
  - Central Volcanic Zone
  - North Volcanic Zone
- Central America Volcanic Arc
  - Trans-Mexican Volcanic Belt
- North American Cordillera
  - Cascade Volcanic Arc
  - Aleutian Range
    - Aleutian Islands
    - Aleutian Arc
- Kamchatka Peninsula
- Kuril Islands
- Japan
- Ryukyu Islands
- Taiwan
- Philippine Mobile Belt
- Izu–Bonin–Mariana Arc
  - Izu Islands
  - Bonin Islands
  - Mariana Islands
- Tanimbar and Kai Islands
- Bismarck Archipelago
- Vanuatu
- Bougainville Island
- Solomon Islands
- Fiji
- Tonga Islands
- Kermadec Islands
- Taupō Volcanic Zone

Volcanoes in the central parts of the Pacific Basin, for example the Hawaiian Islands, are very far from subduction zones and they are not part of the Ring of Fire.

== Tectonic plate configurations ==
The Ring of Fire has existed for more than 35 million years. In some parts of the Ring of Fire, subduction has been occurring for much longer.

The current configuration of the Pacific Ring of Fire has been created by the development of the present-day subduction zones, initially (by about 115 million years ago) in South America, North America and Asia. As plate configurations gradually changed, the current subduction zones of Indonesia and New Guinea were created (about 70 million years ago), followed finally by the New Zealand subduction zone (about 35 million years ago).

=== Past plate configurations ===
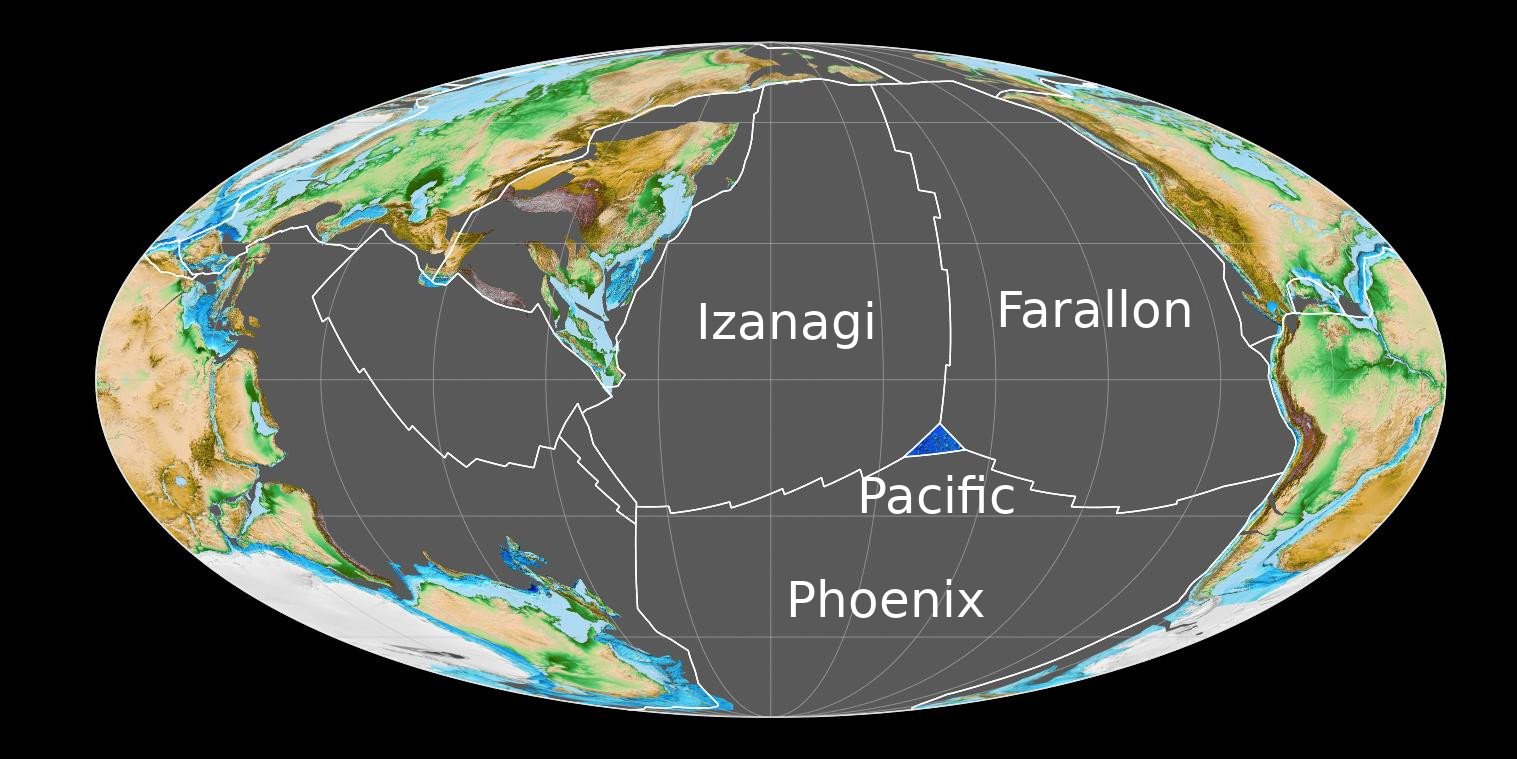
The tectonic plates of the Pacific Ocean in the Early Jurassic (180 Ma)

Along the coast of east Asia, during the Late Triassic about 210 million years ago, subduction of the Izanagi plate (the Paleo-Pacific plate) was occurring, and this continued in the Jurassic, producing volcanic belts, for example, in what is now eastern China. The Pacific plate came into existence in the Early Jurassic about 190 million years ago, far from the margins of the then Paleo-Pacific Ocean. Until the Pacific plate grew large enough to reach the margins of the ocean basin, other older plates were subducted ahead of it at the ocean basin margins. For example, subduction has been occurring at the coast of South America since the Jurassic Period more than 145 million years ago, and remnants of Jurassic and Cretaceous volcanic arcs are preserved there.

At about 120 to 115 million years ago, the Farallon plate was subducting under South America, North America and north-east Asia while the Izanagi plate was subducting under east Asia. By 85 to 70 million years ago, the Izanagi plate had moved north-eastwards and was subducting under east Asia and North America, while the Farallon plate was subducting under South America and the Pacific plate was subducting under east Asia. About 70 to 65 million years ago, the Farallon plate was subducting under South America, the Kula plate was subducting under North America and north-east Asia, and the Pacific plate was subducting under east Asia and Papua New Guinea. About 35 million years ago, the Kula and Farallon plates had been subducted and the Pacific plate was subducting around its rim in a configuration closely resembling the outline of the present-day Ring of Fire.

=== Present-day plate configuration ===
Present-day principal tectonic plates of the Earth

The eastern parts of the Ring of Fire result from the collision of a few relatively large plates. The western parts of the Ring are more complex, with a number of large and small tectonic plates in collision.

In South America, the Ring of Fire is the result of the Antarctic plate, the Nazca plate and the Cocos plate being subducted beneath the South American plate. In Central America, the Cocos plate is being subducted beneath the Caribbean plate. A portion of the Pacific plate and the small Juan de Fuca plate are being subducted beneath the North American plate. Along the northern portion, the northwestward-moving Pacific plate is being subducted beneath the Aleutian Islands arc. Farther west, the Pacific plate is being subducted at the Kamchatka Peninsula and Kuril arcs. Farther south, at Japan, Taiwan and the Philippines, the Philippine Plate is being subducted beneath the Eurasian plate. The southwest section of the Ring of Fire is more complex, with a number of smaller tectonic plates in collision with the Pacific plate at the Mariana Islands, the Philippines, eastern Indonesia, Papua New Guinea, Tonga, and New Zealand; this part of the Ring excludes Australia, because that landmass lies in the center of its tectonic plate far from subduction zones.

== Subduction zones and oceanic trenches ==
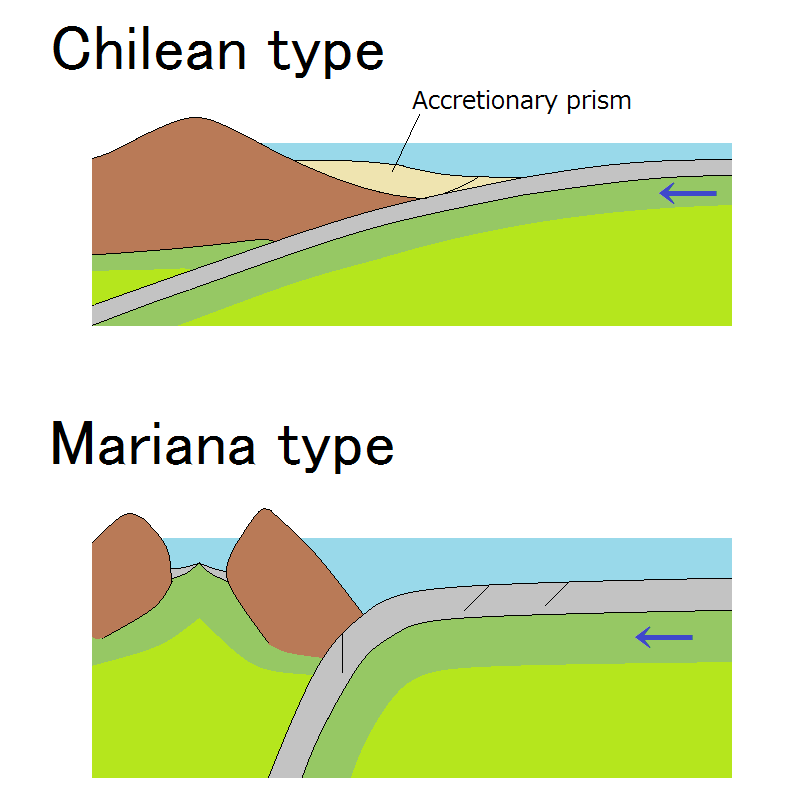
Chilean-type and Mariana-type subduction zones

If a tectonic plate's oceanic lithosphere is subducted beneath oceanic lithosphere of another plate, a volcanic island arc is created at the subduction zone. An example in the Ring of Fire is the Mariana Arc in the western Pacific Ocean. If, however, oceanic lithosphere is subducted under continental lithosphere, then a volcanic continental arc forms; a Ring of Fire example is the coast of Chile.

The steepness of the descending plate at a subduction zone depends on the age of the oceanic lithosphere that is being subducted. The older the oceanic lithosphere being subducted, the steeper the angle of descent of the subducted slab. As the Pacific's mid-ocean ridges, which are the source of its oceanic lithosphere, are not actually in the middle of the ocean but located much closer to South America than to Asia, the oceanic lithosphere consumed at the South American subduction zones is younger and therefore subduction occurs at the South American coast at a relatively shallow angle. Older oceanic lithosphere is subducted in the western Pacific, with steeper angles of slab descent. This variation affects, for example, the location of volcanoes relative to the ocean trench, lava composition, type and severity of earthquakes, sediment accretion, and the amount of compression or tension. A spectrum of subduction zones exists between the Chilean and Mariana end members.

=== Oceanic trenches ===
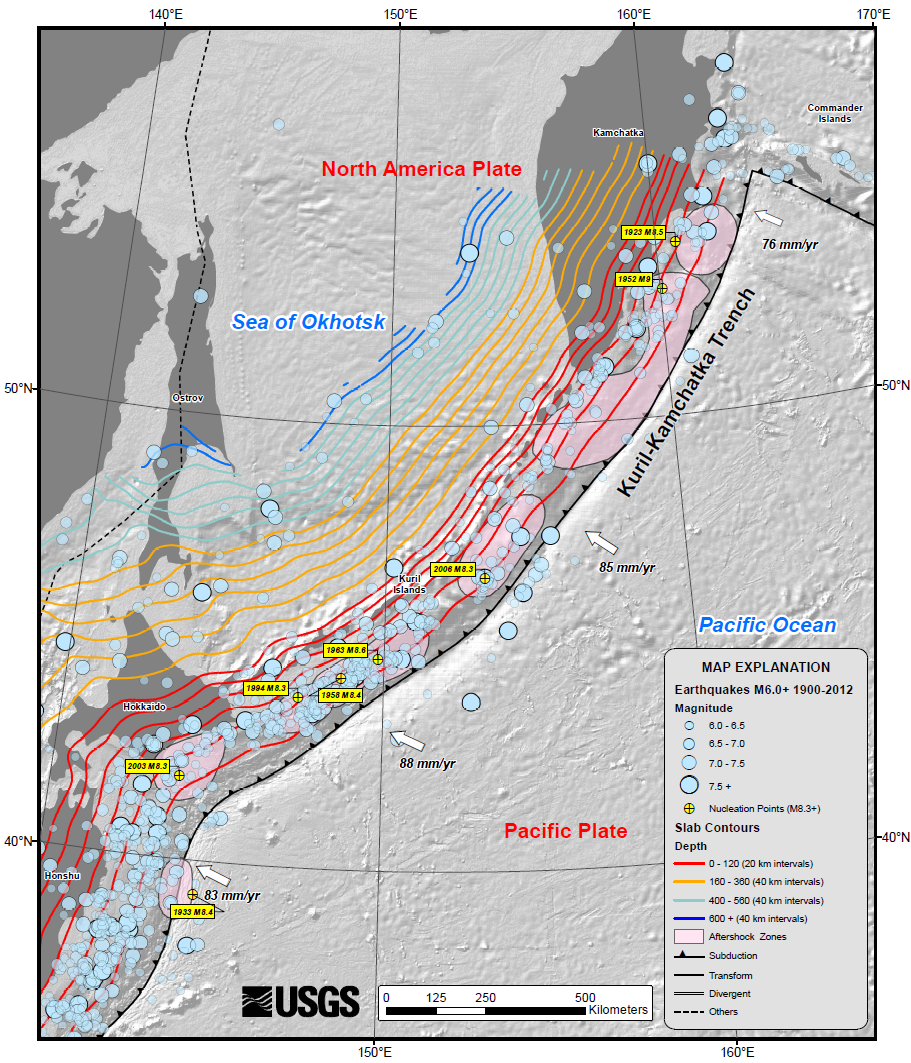
Map of earthquake epicenters at the Kuril–Kamchatka trench and subduction zone

Oceanic trenches are the topographic expression of subduction zones on the floor of the oceans. Oceanic trenches associated with the Ring of Fire's subduction zones are:

- Peru–Chile Trench
- Middle America Trench
- Aleutian Trench
- Kuril–Kamchatka Trench
- Japan Trench
- Ryukyu Trench
- Izu–Bonin Trench
- Mariana Trench
- Yap Trench
- Philippine Trench
- Sunda Trench
- Tonga Trench
- Kermadec Trench
- Hikurangi Trough

=== Gaps ===
Subduction zones around the Pacific Ocean do not form a complete ring. Where subduction zones are absent, there are corresponding gaps in subduction-related volcanic belts in the Ring of Fire. In some gaps there is no volcanic activity; in other gaps, volcanic activity does occur but it is caused by processes not related to subduction.

There are gaps in the Ring of Fire at some parts of the Pacific coast of the Americas. In some places, the gaps are thought to be caused by flat slab subduction; examples are the three gaps between the four sections of the Andean Volcanic Belt in South America. In North America, there is a gap in subduction-related volcanic activity in northern Mexico and southern California, due partly to a divergent boundary in the Gulf of California and due partly to the San Andreas Fault (a non-volcanic transform boundary). Another North American gap in subduction-related volcanic activity occurs in northern British Columbia, Yukon and south-east Alaska, where volcanism is caused by intraplate continental rifting.

== Distribution of volcanoes ==
Distribution of Ring of Fire volcanoes active in the Holocene Epoch (last 11,700 years)
Continent	Country	Region	Volcanoes (subduction zone)	Volcanoes (other)	Comments	Consensus for inclusion
Antarctica		Antarctic Peninsula (Graham Land)	0	3 intraplate		No
Antarctica		South Shetland Islands	0	4 intraplate	intraplate rift volcanoes associated with back-arc rifting linked to subduction	No
South America	Chile		71	0	excluding Easter Island (oceanic rift)	Yes
South America	Chile-Argentina		18	0	border shared by two countries	Yes
South America	Argentina		15	4 intraplate	no coast on the Pacific Ocean	No
South America	Chile-Bolivia		6	0	border shared by two countries	Yes
South America	Bolivia		5	0	no coast on the Pacific Ocean	No
South America	Chile-Peru		1	0	border shared by two countries	Yes
South America	Peru		16	0		Yes
South America	Ecuador		21	0	excluding the Galápagos Islands (hotspot)	Yes
South America	Ecuador-Colombia		1	0	border shared by two countries	Yes
South America	Colombia		13	0		Yes
North America	Panama		2	0		Yes
North America	Costa Rica		10	0		Yes
North America	Nicaragua		17	0		Yes
North America	Honduras		4	0		Yes
North America	El Salvador		18	0		Yes
North America	El Salvador-Guatemala		2	0	border shared by two countries	Yes
North America	Guatemala		21	0		Yes
North America	Guatemala-Mexico		1	0	border shared by two countries	Yes
North America	Mexico		26	8 rift	excluding 3 oceanic rift volcanoes; 8 continental rift volcanoes in Baja California	Yes
North America	United States	California, Oregon, Washington	22	9 rift	9 continental rift volcanoes (6 in southern California and 3 in Oregon)	Yes
North America	Canada		6	16 intraplate	excluding 2 oceanic rift volcanoes	Yes
North America	United States	Alaska	80	4 intraplate in southeast Alaska	including 39 volcanoes in the Aleutian Islands; excluding 4 intraplate volcanoes in western Alaska far from subduction zone	Yes
Asia	Russia	Kamchatka	67	0	including 1 submarine volcano (Piip) in the Aleutian arc	Yes
Asia	Russia	Kuril Islands	44	0	including 3 submarine volcanoes; 15 volcanoes claimed by Japan	Yes
Asia	Japan		81	0	excluding the Izu Islands and the Bonin Islands	Yes
Asia	Taiwan		4	0	including 2 submarine volcanoes	Yes
	Japan	Izu Islands and Bonin Islands	26	0	including 13 submarine volcanoes	No
	United States	Northern Mariana Islands and Guam	25	0	including 16 submarine volcanoes	No
Asia	Philippines		41	0	including 1 submarine volcano	Yes
Asia	Indonesia	western islands	70		Sumatra (27 volcanoes), Krakatoa, Java (36 volcanoes), Bali (3 volcanoes), Lombok, Sumbawa and Sangeang (i.e. the Sunda Arc, north of the Sunda subduction zone between the Australian plate and the Sunda plate)	No
Asia	Indonesia	eastern islands	54		Sulawesi, Lesser Sunda Islands (excluding Bali, Lombok, Sumbawa and Sangeang), Halmahera, Banda Islands, Sangihe Islands	Yes
	Papua New Guinea		47	1 rift	including 2 submarine volcanoes	Yes
	Solomon Islands		8	0	including 4 submarine volcanoes	Yes
	Vanuatu		14	0		Yes
	claimed by Vanuatu and France (New Caledonia)		2	1 rift	Hunter Island and Matthew Island; East Gemini Seamount is a seamount at an oceanic rift	Yes
	Fiji		3	0		Yes
	France	Wallis and Futuna	1	0	mantle plume and subduction	No
	Samoa		2	0	mantle plume and subduction	No
	United States	American Samoa	4	0	mantle plume and subduction; including 1 submarine seamount	No
	Tonga		17	3 rift	including 13 submarine volcanoes, 3 of which are subduction-related back-arc rift volcanoes	Yes
	between Tonga and Kermadec Islands		1	0	Monowai submarine seamount (between the exclusive economic zones of Tonga and New Zealand)	Yes
	New Zealand	Kermadec Islands	6	0	including 4 submarine volcanoes	Yes
	New Zealand		20	0	excluding the Kermadec Islands; including 8 submarine volcanoes	Yes
Total			913	59		

== Very large events ==
=== Volcanic eruptions ===
The four largest volcanic eruptions on Earth in the Holocene Epoch (the last 11,700 years) occurred at volcanoes in the Ring of Fire. They are the eruptions at Fisher Caldera (Alaska, 8700 BC), Kurile Lake (Kamchatka, 6450 BC), Kikai Caldera (Japan, 5480 BC) and Mount Mazama (Oregon, 5677 BC). More broadly, twenty (Note: Twenty-two if the western islands of Indonesia are included.) of the twenty-five largest volcanic eruptions on Earth in this time interval occurred at Ring of Fire volcanoes.

=== Earthquakes ===
About 90% of the world's earthquakes and most of the world's largest earthquakes occur along the Ring of Fire. (Note: if Antarctica and the western islands of Indonesia are excluded) The next most seismically active region (5–6% of earthquakes and some of the world's largest earthquakes) is the Alpide belt, which extends from central Indonesia to the northern Atlantic Ocean via the Himalayas and southern Europe.

From 1900 to the end of 2020, most earthquakes of magnitude M_{w} ≥ 8.0 occurred in the Ring of Fire. (Note: 79 of 95 earthquakes (if the western islands of Indonesia are excluded).) They are presumed to have been megathrust earthquakes at subduction zones, including four of the most powerful earthquakes on Earth since modern seismological measuring equipment and magnitude measurement scales were introduced in the 1930s:

- 1960 Valdivia earthquake, Chile (magnitude M_{w} 9.4–9.6)
- 1964 Alaska earthquake, United States (magnitude M_{w} 9.2)
- 2011 Tōhoku earthquake and tsunami, Japan (magnitude M_{w} 9.0–9.1)
- 1952 Severo-Kurilsk earthquake, Kamchatka, Russia (magnitude M_{w} 9.0)

== Antarctica ==
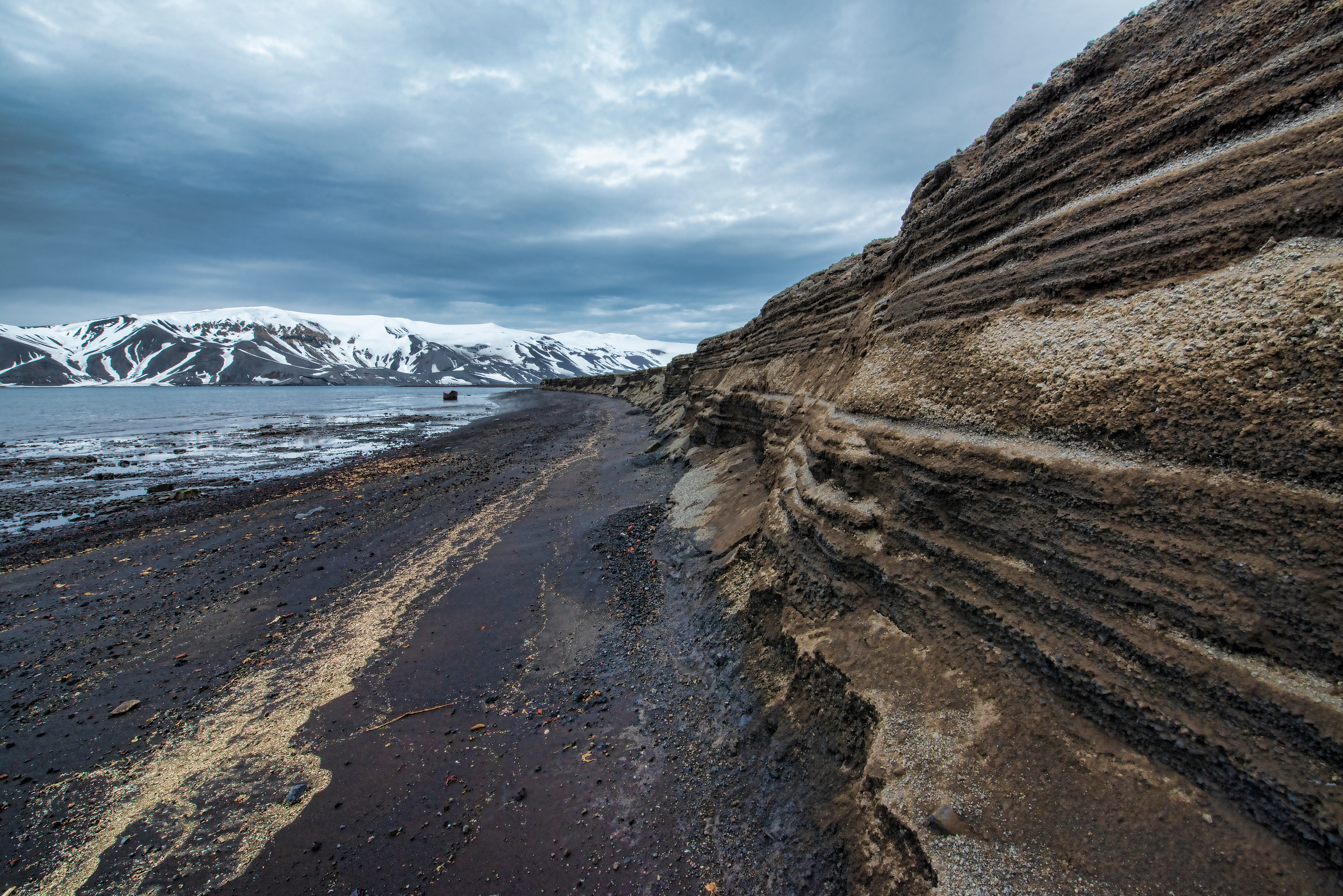
Layers of phreatomagmatic tephra on Deception Island

Some geologists include the volcanoes of the South Shetland Islands, off the northern tip of the Antarctic Peninsula, as part of the Ring of Fire. These volcanoes, e.g. Deception Island, are due to rifting in the Bransfield back-arc basin close to the South Shetland subduction zone. The Antarctic Peninsula (Graham Land) is also sometimes included in the Ring. Volcanoes south of the Antarctic Circle (e.g. the volcanoes of Victoria Land including Mount Erebus, and the volcanoes of Mary Byrd Land) are not related to subduction; therefore, they are not part of the Ring of Fire.

The Balleny Islands, located between Antarctica and New Zealand, are volcanic but their volcanism is not related to subduction; therefore, they are not part of the Ring of Fire.

== South America ==
The world's highest active volcano is Ojos del Salado (6,893 m or 22,615 ft), which is in the Andes Mountains section of the Ring of Fire. It forms part of the border between Argentina and Chile and it last erupted in AD 750. Another Ring of Fire Andean volcano on the Argentina-Chile border is Llullaillaco (6,739 m or 22,110 ft), which is the world's highest historically active volcano, last erupting in 1877.

=== Chile ===
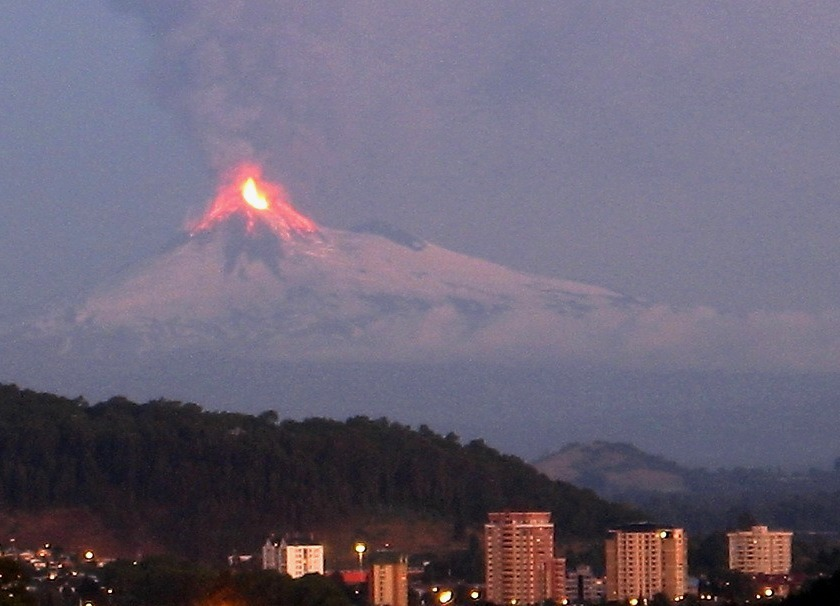
Llaima's 2008 eruption

Chile has experienced numerous volcanic eruptions from about 90 volcanoes during the Holocene Epoch.

Villarrica is one of Chile's most active volcanoes, rising above the lake and town of the same name. It is the westernmost of three large stratovolcanoes that trend perpendicular to the Andes along the Gastre Fault. Villarrica, along with Quetrupillán and the Chilean part of Lanín, are protected within Villarrica National Park.

Villarrica, with its lava of basaltic-andesitic composition, is one of only five volcanoes worldwide known to have an active lava lake within its crater. The volcano usually generates strombolian eruptions, with ejection of incandescent pyroclasts and lava flows. Melting of snow and glacier ice, as well as rainfall, often causes lahars, such as during the eruptions of 1964 and 1971.

A two-kilometre-wide (1 1/4 mi) postglacial caldera is located at the base of the presently active dominantly basaltic-to-andesitic cone at the northwest margin of the Pleistocene caldera. About 25 scoria cones dot Villarica's flanks. Plinian eruptions and pyroclastic flows have been produced during the Holocene from this dominantly basaltic volcano, but historical eruptions have consisted of largely mild-to-moderate explosive activity with occasional lava effusion. Lahars from the glacier-covered volcanoes have damaged towns on its flanks.

The Llaima Volcano is one of the largest and most active volcanoes in Chile. It is situated 82 km (51 mi) northeast of Temuco and 663 km (412 mi) southeast of Santiago, within the borders of Conguillío National Park. Llaima's activity has been documented since the 17th century, and consists of several separate episodes of moderate explosive eruptions with occasional lava flows.

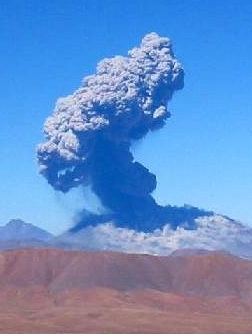
Lascar erupting in 2006

Lascar is a stratovolcano and the most active volcano of the northern Chilean Andes. The largest eruption of Lascar took place about 26,500 years ago, and following the eruption of the Tumbres scoria flow about 9,000 years ago, activity shifted back to the eastern edifice, where three overlapping craters were formed. Frequent small-to-moderate explosive eruptions have been recorded from Lascar in historical time since the mid-19th century, along with periodic larger eruptions that produced ash and tephra fall up to hundreds of kilometers away from the volcano. The largest eruption of Lascar in recent history took place in 1993, producing pyroclastic flows as far as 8.5 km (5 mi) northwest of the summit and ash fall in Buenos Aires, Argentina, more than 1,600 km (1,000 mi) to the southeast.

Chiliques is a stratovolcano located in the Antofagasta Region of Chile, immediately north of Cerro Miscanti. Laguna Lejía lies to the north of the volcano and has been dormant for at least 10,000 years, but is now showing signs of life. A January 6, 2002, nighttime thermal infrared image from ASTER revealed a hot spot in the summit crater, as well as several others along the upper flanks of the volcano's edifice, indicating new volcanic activity. Examination of an earlier nighttime thermal infrared image from May 24, 2000, showed no such hot spots.

Calbuco is a stratovolcano in southern Chile, located southeast of Llanquihue Lake and northwest of Chapo Lake, in Los Lagos Region. The volcano and the surrounding area are protected within Llanquihue National Reserve. It is a very explosive andesite volcano that underwent edifice collapse in the late Pleistocene, producing a volcanic debris avalanche that reached the lake. At least nine eruptions occurred since 1837, with the latest one in 1972. One of the largest historical eruptions in southern Chile took place there in 1893–1894. Violent eruptions ejected 30 cm (12 in) bombs to distances of 8 km (5.0 mi) from the crater, accompanied by voluminous hot lahars. Strong explosions occurred in April 1917, and a lava dome formed in the crater accompanied by hot lahars. Another short explosive eruption in January 1929 also included an apparent pyroclastic flow and a lava flow. The last major eruption of Calbuco, in 1961, sent ash columns 12–15 km (7.5–9.3 mi) high and produced plumes that dispersed mainly to the southeast and two lava flows were also emitted. A minor, four-hour eruption happened on August 26, 1972. Strong fumarolic emission from the main crater was observed on August 12, 1996.

Lonquimay is a stratovolocano of late-Pleistocene to dominantly Holocene age, with the shape of a truncated cone. The cone is largely andesitic, though basaltic and dacitic rocks are present. It is located in La Araucanía Region of Chile, immediately southeast of Tolhuaca volcano. Sierra Nevada and Llaima are their neighbors to the south. The snow-capped volcano lies within the protected area Malalcahuello-Nalcas. The volcano last erupted in 1988, ending in 1990. The Volcanic Explosivity Index (VEI) was 3. The eruption was from a flank vent and involved lava flows and explosive eruptions. Some fatalities occurred.

The volcanoes in Chile are monitored by the National Geology and Mining Service (SERNAGEOMIN)

Earthquake activity in Chile is related to subduction of the Nazca plate to the east. Chile notably holds the record for the largest earthquake ever recorded, the 1960 Valdivia earthquake. More recently, a magnitude-8.8 earthquake struck central Chile on February 27, 2010, the Puyehue-Cordón Caulle volcano erupted in 2011, and a M8.2 earthquake struck northern Chile on April 1, 2014. The main shock was preceded by a number of moderate to large shocks and was followed by a large number of moderate to very large aftershocks, including a magnitude-7.6 event on April 2.

=== Bolivia ===
Bolivia hosts active and extinct volcanoes across its territory. The active volcanoes are located in western Bolivia where they make up the Cordillera Occidental, the western limit of the Altiplano plateau. Some of the active volcanoes are international mountains shared with Chile. All Cenozoic volcanoes of Bolivia are part of the Central Volcanic Zone (CVZ) of the Andean Volcanic Belt that results due to processes involved in the subduction of the Nazca plate under the South American plate. The Central Volcanic Zone is a major late Cenozoic volcanic province.

=== Peru ===
Sabancaya is an active 5,976-metre (19,606 ft) stratovolcano in the Andes of southern Peru, about 100 km (60 mi) northwest of Arequipa. It is the most active volcano in Peru, with an ongoing eruption that started in 2016.

Ubinas is another active volcano of 5,672-metre (18,609 ft) in southern Peru; its most recent eruption occurred in 2019.

Volcanoes in Peru are monitored by the Peruvian Geophysical Institute.

=== Ecuador ===
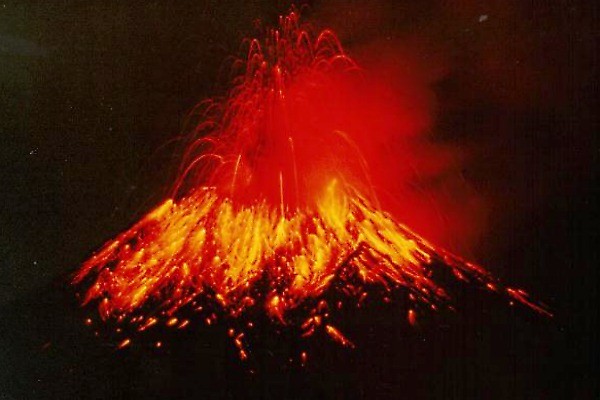
Tungurahua erupting molten lava at night (1999)

Cotopaxi is a stratovolcano in the Andes, located about 50 km (30 mi) south of Quito, Ecuador, South America. It is the second-highest summit in the country, reaching a height of 5,897 m (19,347 ft). Since 1738, Cotopaxi has erupted more than 50 times, resulting in the creation of numerous valleys formed by mudflows around the volcano.

In October 1999, Pichincha Volcano erupted in Quito and covered the city with several inches of ash. Prior to that, the last major eruptions were in 1553 and in 1660, when about 30 cm of ash fell on the city.

At 5,286 m (17,343 ft), Sangay Volcano is an active stratovolcano in central Ecuador, one of the highest active volcanoes in the world and is one of Ecuador's most active volcanoes. It exhibits mostly strombolian activity; An eruption, which started in 1934, ended in 2011. More recent eruptions have occurred. Geologically, Sangay marks the southern bound of the Northern Volcanic Zone, and its position straddling two major pieces of crust accounts for its high level of activity. Sangay's roughly 500,000-year history is one of instability; two previous versions of the mountain were destroyed in massive flank collapses, evidence of which still litters its surroundings today. Sangay is one of two active volcanoes located within the namesake Sangay National Park, the other being Tungurahua to the north. As such, it has been listed as a UNESCO World Heritage Site since 1983.

Reventador is an active stratovolcano that lies in the eastern Andes of Ecuador. Since 1541, it has erupted over 25 times, with its most recent eruption starting in 2008 and, as of 2020, still ongoing, but the largest historical eruption occurred in 2002. During that eruption, the plume from the volcano reached a height of 17 km (10 1/2 mi), and pyroclastic flows reached 7 km (4.3 mi) from the cone. On March 30, 2007, the volcano erupted ash again, which reached a height of about 3 km (2 mi).

In Ecuador, EPN monitors volcanic activity.

== North America ==
=== Central America ===
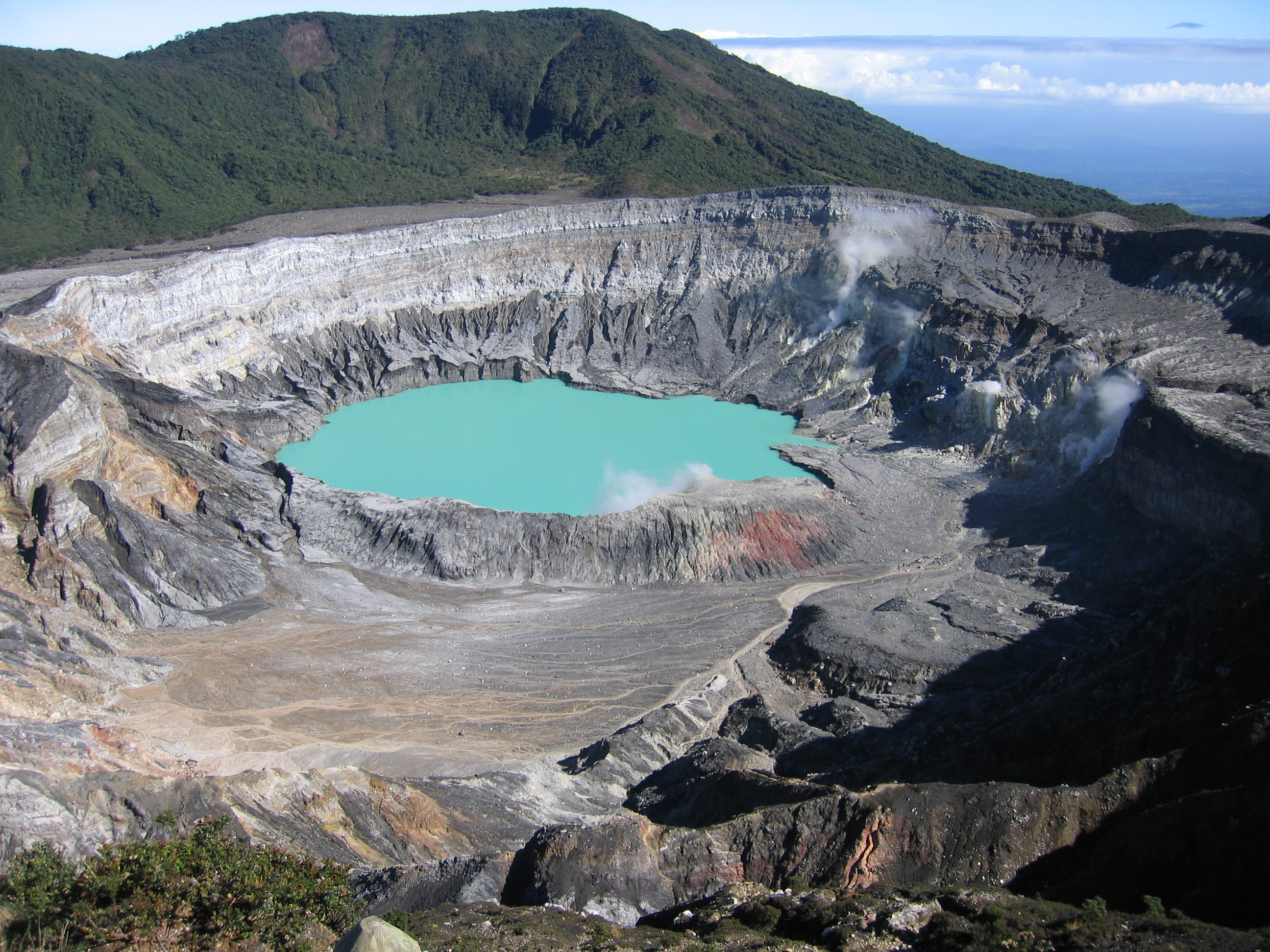
Crater of Poás volcano in Costa Rica, 2004

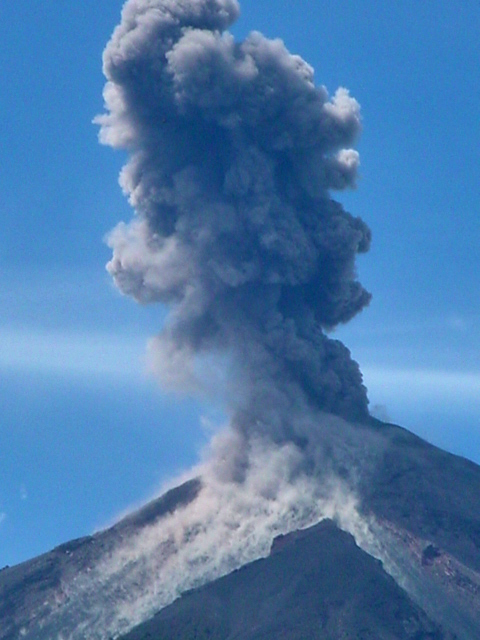
Santiaguito Volcano, 2003 eruption in Guatemala

==== Costa Rica ====
Poás Volcano is an active 2,708-metre (8,885 ft) stratovolcano located in central Costa Rica; it has erupted 39 times since 1828.

The Volcanological and Seismological Observatory of Costa Rica (OVSICORI, Observatorio Vulcanológico y Sismológico de Costa Rica) at the National University of Costa Rica has a dedicated team in charge of researching and monitoring the volcanoes, earthquakes, and other tectonic processes in the Central America Volcanic Arc.

==== Guatemala ====
In 1902, the Santa Maria Volcano erupted violently in Guatemala, with the largest explosions occurring over two days, ejecting an estimated 5.5 km^{3} (1 3/8 cu mi) of magma. The eruption was one of the largest of the 20th century, only slightly less in magnitude to that of Mount Pinatubo in 1991. The eruption had a volcanic explosivity index of 6. Today, Santiaguito is one of the world's most active volcanoes.

=== North American Cordillera ===
==== Mexico ====
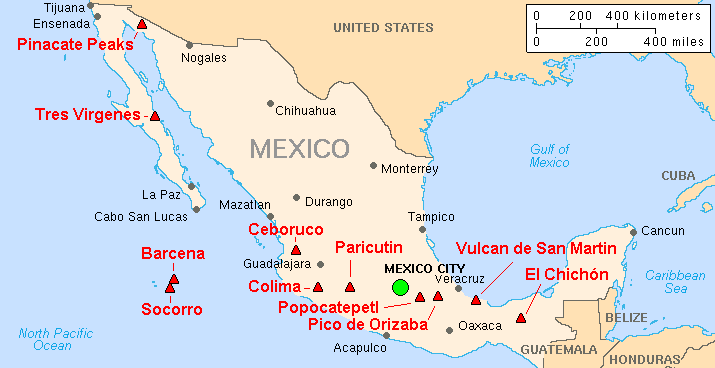
The Trans-Mexican Volcanic Belt

Volcanoes of Mexico related to subduction of the Cocos and Rivera plates occur in the Trans-Mexican Volcanic Belt, which extends 900 km (560 mi) from west to east across central-southern Mexico. Popocatépetl, lying in the eastern half of the Trans-Mexican Volcanic Belt, is the second-highest peak in Mexico after the Pico de Orizaba. It is one of the most active volcanoes in Mexico, having had more than 20 major eruptions since the arrival of the Spanish in 1519. The 1982 eruption of El Chichón, which killed about 2,000 people who lived near the volcano, created a 1-km-wide caldera that filled with an acidic crater lake. Before 1982, this relatively unknown volcano was heavily forested and of no greater height than adjacent nonvolcanic peaks.

==== United States ====
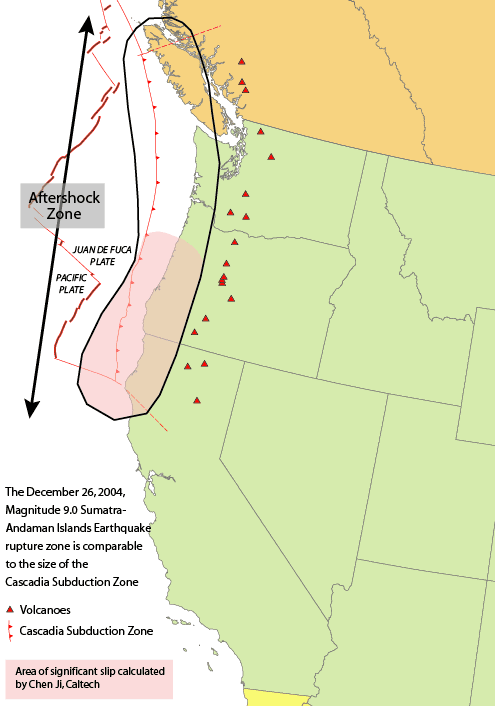
Area of the Cascadia subduction zone, including the Cascade Volcanic Arc (red triangles)

The Cascade Volcanic Arc lies in the western United States. This arc includes nearly 20 major volcanoes, among a total of over 4,000 separate volcanic vents including numerous stratovolcanoes, shield volcanoes, lava domes, and cinder cones, along with a few isolated examples of rarer volcanic forms such as tuyas. Volcanism in the arc began about 37 million years ago, but most of the present-day Cascade volcanoes are less than 2 million years old, and the highest peaks are less than 100,000 years old. The arc is formed by the subduction of the Gorda and Juan de Fuca plates at the Cascadia subduction zone. This is a 1,090-kilometre-long (680 mi) fault, running 80 km (50 mi) off the coast of the Pacific Northwest from northern California to Vancouver Island, British Columbia. The plates move at a relative rate of over 10 mm (0.4 in) per year at an oblique angle to the subduction zone.

Because of the very large fault area, the Cascadia subduction zone can produce very large earthquakes, magnitude 9.0 or greater, if rupture occurred over its whole area. When the "locked" zone stores energy for an earthquake, the "transition" zone, although somewhat plastic, can rupture. Thermal and deformation studies indicate that the locked zone is fully locked for 60 km (37 mi) down-dip from the deformation front. Further down-dip, a transition from fully locked to aseismic sliding occurs.

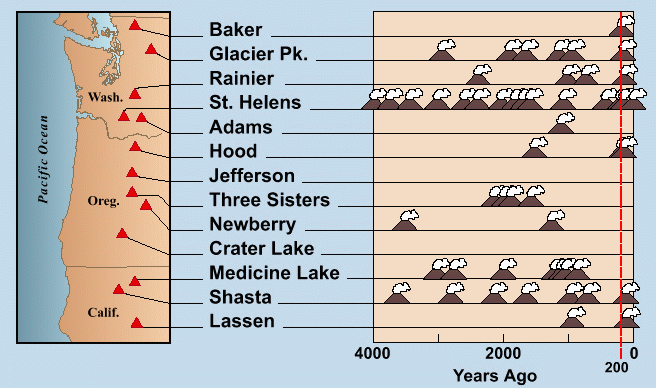
American Cascade Range volcano eruptions in the last 4000 years

Unlike most subduction zones worldwide, no oceanic trench is present along the continental margin in Cascadia. Instead, terranes and the accretionary wedge have been lifted up to form a series of coast ranges and exotic mountains. A high rate of sedimentation from the outflow of the three major rivers (Fraser River, Columbia River, and Klamath River) which cross the Cascade Range contributes to further obscuring the presence of a trench. However, in common with most other subduction zones, the outer margin is slowly being compressed, similar to a giant spring. When the stored energy is suddenly released by slippage across the fault at irregular intervals, the Cascadia subduction zone can create very large earthquakes such as the magnitude-9 Cascadia earthquake of 1700. Geological evidence indicates that great earthquakes may have occurred at least seven times in the last 3,500 years, suggesting a return time of 400 to 600 years. Also, evidence of accompanying tsunamis with every earthquake is seen, as the prime reason these earthquakes are known is through "scars" the tsunamis left on the coast, and through Japanese records (tsunami waves can travel across the Pacific).

The 1980 eruption of Mount St. Helens was the most significant to occur in the contiguous 48 U.S. states in recorded history (Volcanic Explosivity Index (VEI) = 5, 1.3 km^{3} (0.3 cu mi) of material erupted), exceeding the destructive power and volume of material released by the 1915 eruption of California's Lassen Peak. The eruption was preceded by a two-month series of earthquakes and steam-venting episodes caused by an injection of magma at shallow depth below the mountain that created a huge bulge and a fracture system on Mount St. Helens' north slope. An earthquake at 8:32 am on May 18, 1980, caused the entire weakened north face to slide away, suddenly exposing the partly molten, gas-rich rock in the volcano to lower pressure. The rock responded by exploding into a very hot mix of pulverized lava and older rock that sped toward Spirit Lake so fast that it quickly passed the avalanching north face.

Alaska is known for its seismic and volcanic activity, holding the record for the second-largest earthquake in the world, the Good Friday earthquake, and having more than 50 volcanoes which have erupted since about 1760. Volcanoes are found not only in the mainland, but also in the Aleutian Islands.

The United States Geological Survey and the National Earthquake Information Center monitor volcanoes and earthquakes in the United States.

==== Canada ====
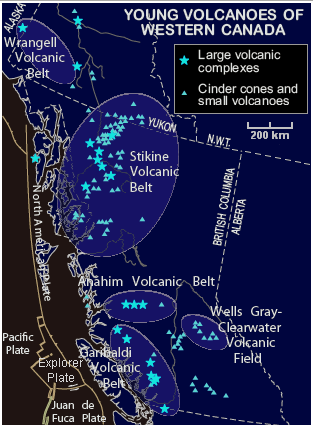
Map of young volcanoes in Western Canada

British Columbia and Yukon are home to a region of volcanoes and volcanic activity in the Pacific Ring of Fire. More than 20 volcanoes have erupted in the western Canada during the Holocene Epoch but only 6 are directly related to subduction: Bridge River Cones, Mount Cayley, Mount Garibaldi, Garibaldi Lake, Silverthrone Caldera, and Mount Meager massif. Several mountains in populated areas of British Columbia are dormant volcanoes. Most of these were active during the Pleistocene and Holocene epochs. Although none of Canada's volcanoes are currently erupting, several volcanoes, volcanic fields, and volcanic centers are considered potentially active. There are hot springs at some volcanoes. Since 1975, seismic activity appears to have been associated with some volcanoes in British Columbia including the six subduction-related volcanoes as well as intraplate volcanoes such as Wells Gray-Clearwater volcanic field. The volcanoes are grouped into five volcanic belts with different tectonic settings.

The Northern Cordilleran Volcanic Province is an area of numerous volcanoes, which are caused by continental rifting,not subduction; therefore geologists often regard it as a gap in the Pacific Ring of Fire between the Cascade Volcanic Arc further south and Alaska's Aleutian Arc further north.

The Garibaldi Volcanic Belt in southwestern British Columbia is the northern extension of the Cascade Volcanic Arc in the United States (which includes Mount Baker and Mount St. Helens) and contains the most explosive young volcanoes in Canada. It formed as a result of subduction of the Juan de Fuca plate (a remnant of the much larger Farallon plate) under the North American plate along the Cascadia subduction zone. The Garibaldi Volcanic Belt includes the Bridge River Cones, Mount Cayley, Mount Fee, Mount Garibaldi, Mount Price, Mount Meager massif, the Squamish Volcanic Field, and more smaller volcanoes. The eruption styles in the belt range from effusive to explosive, with compositions from basalt to rhyolite. Morphologically, centers include calderas, cinder cones, stratovolcanoes and small isolated lava masses. Due to repeated continental and alpine glaciations, many of the volcanic deposits in the belt reflect complex interactions between magma composition, topography, and changing ice configurations. The most recent major catastrophic eruption in the Garibaldi Volcanic Belt was an explosive eruption of the Mount Meager massif about 2,350 years ago. It was similar to the 1980 eruption of Mount St. Helens, sending an ash column about 20 km into the stratosphere.

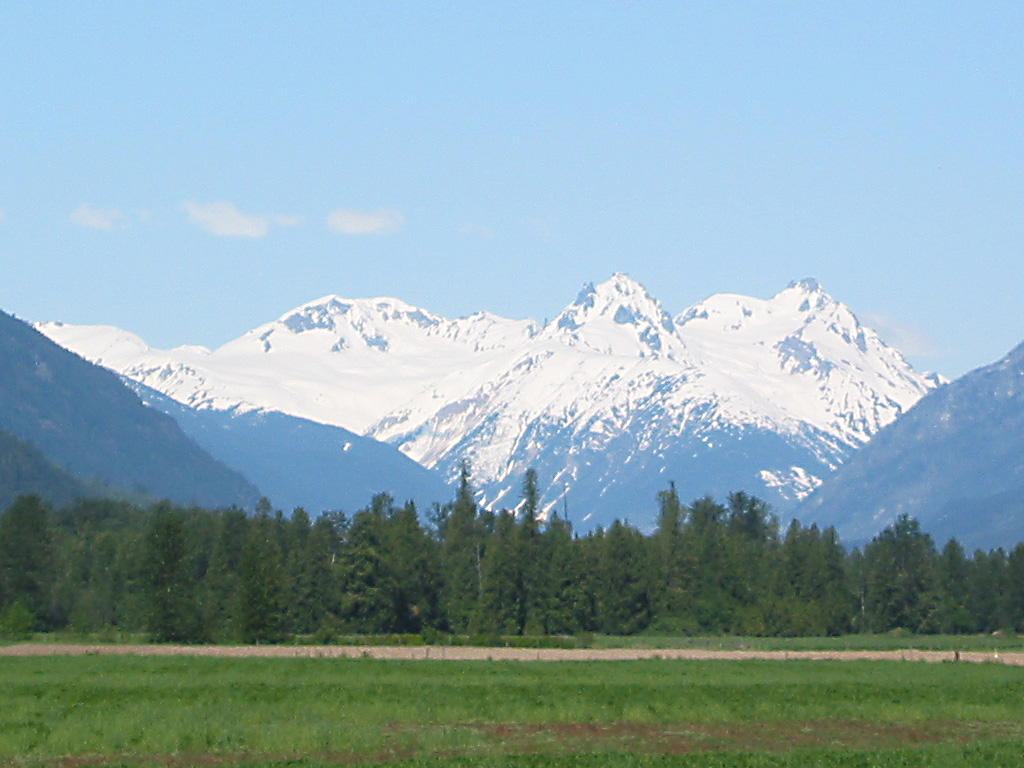
The Mount Meager massif as seen from the east near Pemberton, British Columbia: Summits left to right are Capricorn Mountain, Mount Meager, and Plinth Peak.

The Chilcotin Group is a north–south range of volcanoes in southern British Columbia running parallel to the Garibaldi Volcanic Belt. The majority of the eruptions in this belt happened either 6–10 million years ago (Miocene) or 2–3 million years ago (Pliocene), although with some slightly more recent eruptions (in the Pleistocene). It is thought to have formed as a result of back-arc extension behind the Cascadia subduction zone. Volcanoes in this belt include Mount Noel, the Clisbako Caldera Complex, Lightning Peak, Black Dome Mountain, and many lava flows.

Eruptions of basaltic to rhyolitic volcanoes and hypabyssal rocks of the Alert Bay Volcanic Belt in northern Vancouver Island are probably linked with the subducted margin flanked by the Explorer and Juan de Fuca plates at the Cascadia subduction zone. It appears to have been active during the Pliocene and Pleistocene. However, no Holocene eruptions are known, and volcanic activity in the belt has likely ceased.

The active Queen Charlotte Fault on the west coast of the Haida Gwaii, British Columbia, has generated three large earthquakes during the 20th century: a magnitude 7 event in 1929; a magnitude 8.1 in 1949 (Canada's largest recorded earthquake); and a magnitude 7.4 in 1970.

The Public Safety Geo-science Program at the Natural Resources Canada undertakes research to support risk reduction from the effects of space weather, earthquakes, tsunamis, volcanoes, and landslides.

== Asia ==
=== Russia ===
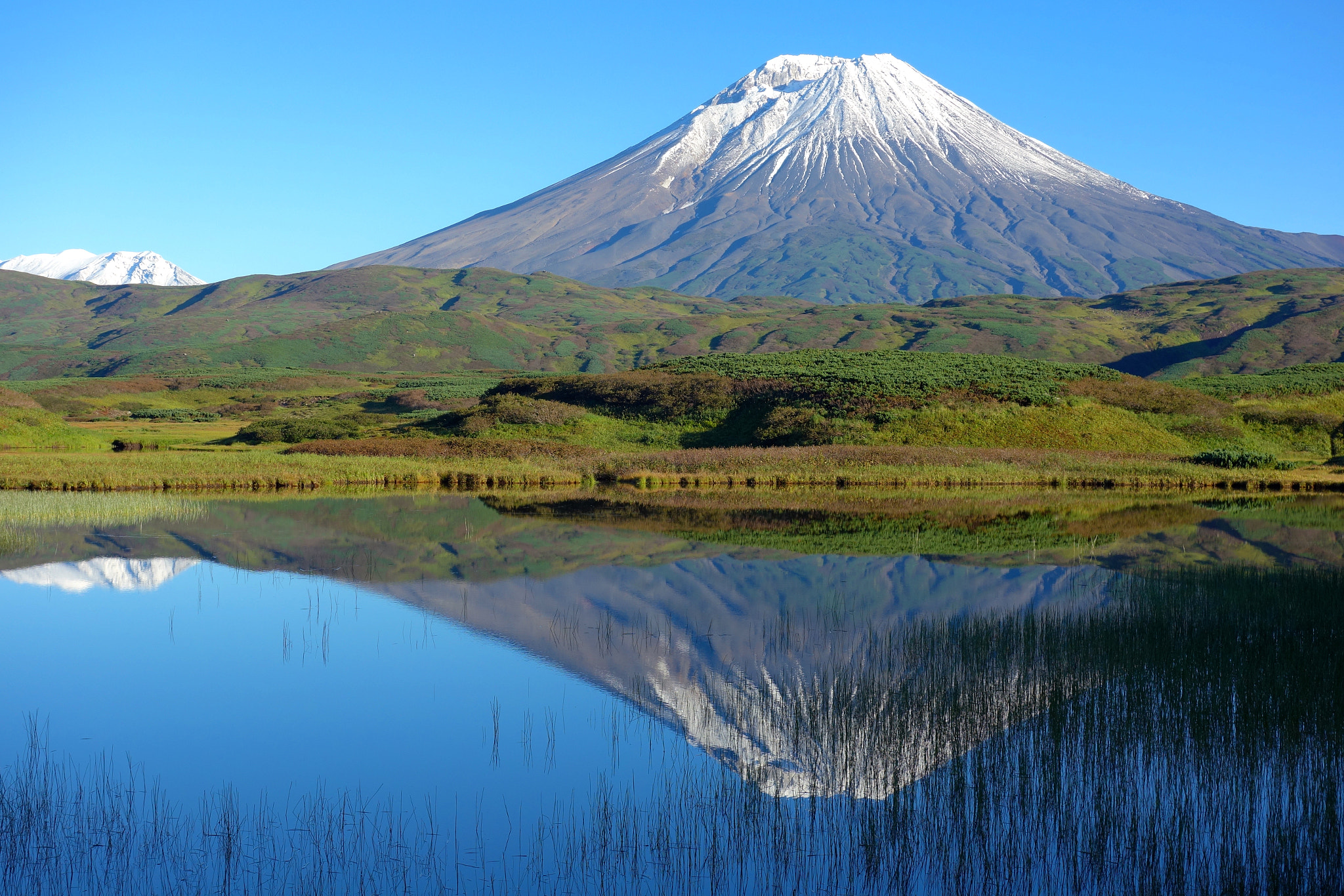
Kambalny, an active volcano in the Kamchatka Peninsula

The Kamchatka Peninsula in the Russian Far East is one of the most active volcanic areas in the world, with 20 historically active volcanoes. It lies between the Pacific Ocean to the east and the Okhotsk Sea to the west. Immediately offshore along the Pacific coast of the peninsula runs the 10,500-metre-deep (34,400 ft) Kuril–Kamchatka Trench, where subduction of the Pacific plate fuels the volcanism. Several types of volcanic activity are present, including stratovolcanoes, shield volcanoes, Hawaiian-style fissure eruptions and geysers.

Active, dormant and extinct volcanoes of Kamchatka are in two major volcanic belts. The most recent activity takes place in the eastern belt, starting in the north at the Shiveluch volcanic complex, which lies at the junction of the Aleutian and Kamchatka volcanic arcs. Just to the south is the Klyuchi volcanic group, comprising the twin volcanic cones of Kliuchevskoi and Kamen, the volcanic complexes of Tolbachik and Ushkovsky, and a number of other large stratovolcanoes. Ichinsky, the only active volcano in the central belt, is located farther to the west. Farther south, the eastern belt of stratovolcanoes continues to the southern tip of Kamchatka, continuing onto the Kuril Islands, with their 32 historically active volcanoes.

=== Japan ===
About 10% of the world's active volcanoes are found in Japan, which lies in a zone of extreme crustal instability. They are formed by subduction of the Pacific plate and the Philippine Sea plate. As many as 1,500 earthquakes are recorded yearly, and magnitudes of 4 to 6 are not uncommon. Minor tremors occur almost daily in one part of the country or another, causing some slight shaking of buildings. Major earthquakes occur infrequently; the most famous in the 20th century were the 1923 Great Kantō earthquake, in which 130,000 people died, and the Great Hanshin earthquake of January 17, 1995, in which 6,434 people died. On March 11, 2011 a magnitude 9.0 earthquake hit Japan, the country's biggest ever and the fifth largest on record, according to US Geological Survey data. Undersea earthquakes also expose the Japanese coastline to danger from tsunamis.

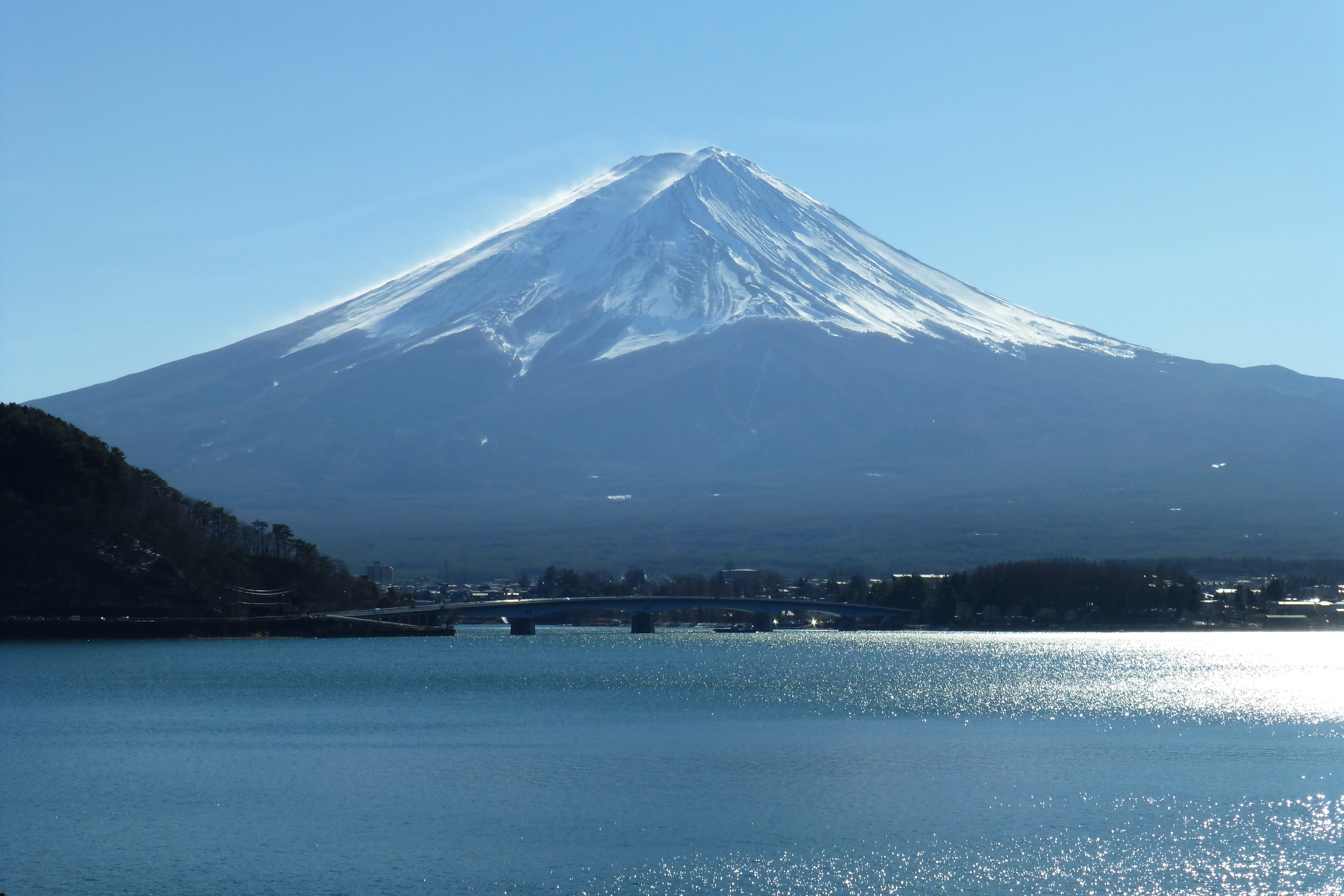
Mount Fuji at sunrise from Lake Kawaguchi

Mount Bandai, one of Japan's most noted volcanoes, rises above the north shore of Lake Inawashiro. Mount Bandai is formed of several overlapping stratovolcanoes, the largest of which is O-Bandai, constructed within a horseshoe-shaped caldera that formed about 40,000 years ago when an earlier volcano collapsed, forming the Okinajima debris avalanche, which traveled to the southwest and was accompanied by a plinian eruption. Four major phreatic eruptions have occurred during the past 5,000 years, two of them in historical time, in 806 and 1888. Seen from the south, Bandai presents a conical profile, but much of the north side of the volcano is missing as a result of the collapse of Ko-Bandai volcano during the 1888 eruption, in which a debris avalanche buried several villages and formed several large lakes. In July 1888, the north flank of Mount Bandai collapsed during an eruption quite similar to the May 18, 1980, eruption of Mount St. Helens. After a week of seismic activity, a large earthquake on July 15, 1888, was followed by a tremendous noise and a large explosion. Eyewitnesses heard about 15 to 20 additional explosions and observed that the last one was projected almost horizontally to the north.

Mount Fuji is Japan's highest and most noted volcano, featuring heavily in Japanese culture and serving as one of the country's most popular landmarks. The modern postglacial stratovolcano is constructed above a group of overlapping volcanoes, remnants of which form irregularities on Fuji's profile. Growth of the younger Mount Fuji began with a period of voluminous lava flows from 11,000 to 8,000 years ago, accounting for four-fifths of the volume of the younger Mount Fuji. Minor explosive eruptions dominated activity from 8,000 to 4,500 years ago, with another period of major lava flows occurring from 4,500 to 3,000 years ago. Subsequently, intermittent major explosive eruptions occurred, with subordinate lava flows and small pyroclastic flows. Summit eruptions dominated from 3,000 to 2,000 years ago, after which flank vents were active. The extensive basaltic lava flows from the summit and some of the more than 100 flank cones and vents blocked drainage against the Tertiary Misaka Mountains on the north side of the volcano, forming the Fuji Five Lakes. The last eruption of this dominantly basaltic volcano in 1707 ejected andesitic pumice and formed a large new crater on the east flank. Some minor volcanic activity may occur in the next few years.

=== Philippines ===
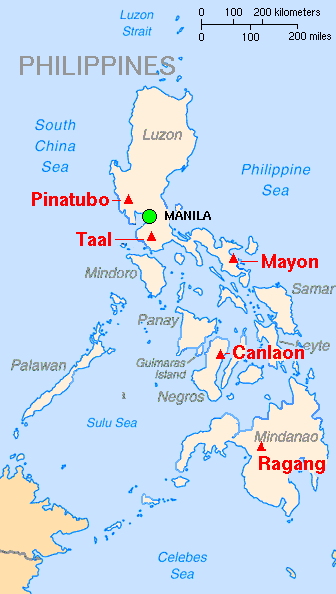
Map showing major volcanoes of the Philippines

The 1991 eruption of Mount Pinatubo is the world's second-largest eruption of the 20th century. Successful predictions of the onset of the climactic eruption led to the evacuation of tens of thousands of people from the surrounding areas, saving many lives, but as the surrounding areas were severely damaged by pyroclastic flows, ash deposits, and later, lahars caused by rainwater remobilising earlier volcanic deposits, thousands of houses were destroyed.

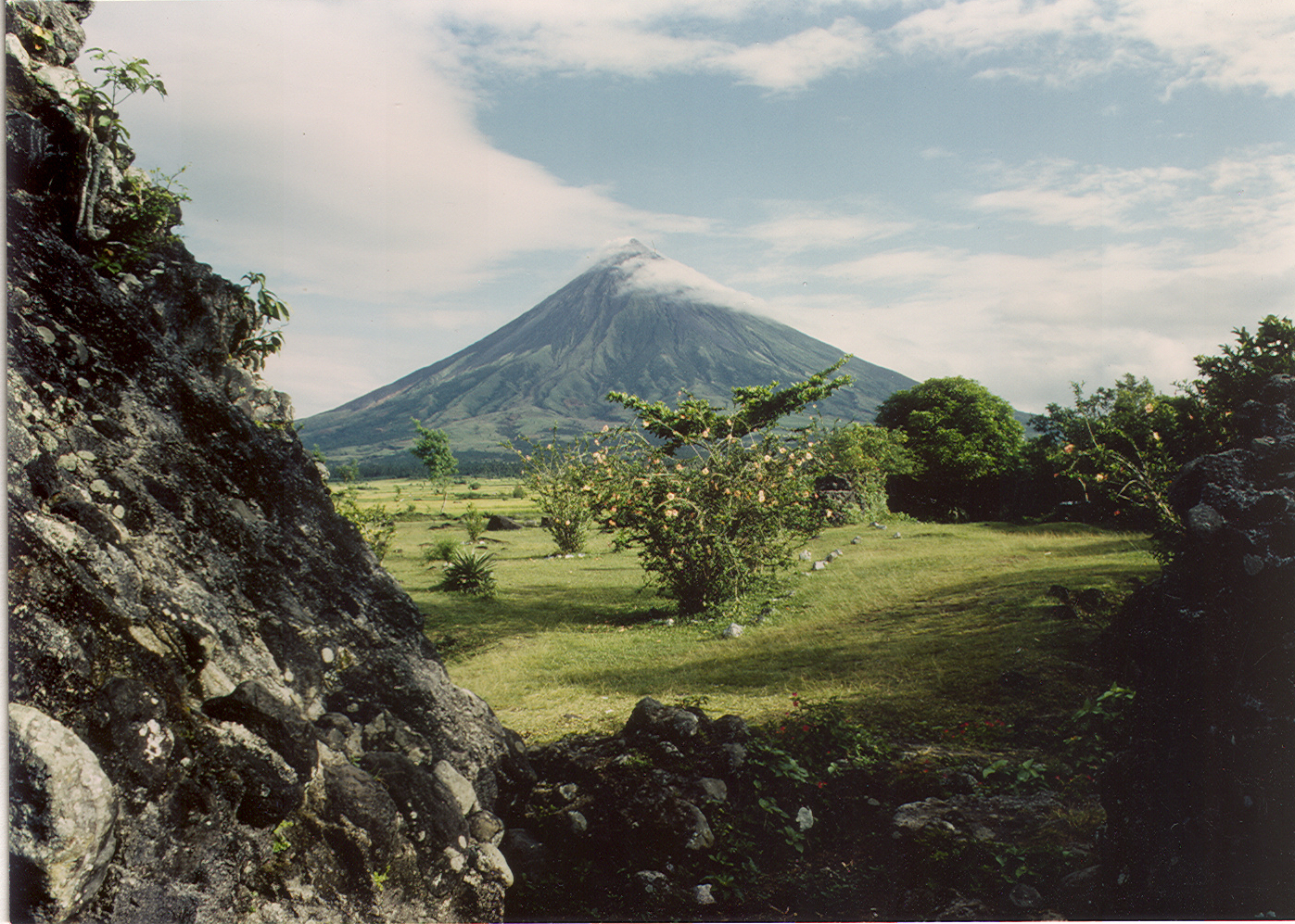
Mayon Volcano overlooks a pastoral scene about five months before the volcano's violent eruption in September 1984.

Mayon Volcano is the Philippines' most active volcano. It has steep upper slopes that average 35–40° and is capped by a small summit crater. The historical eruptions of this basaltic-andesitic volcano date back to 1616 and range from Strombolian to basaltic Plinian eruptions. Eruptions occur predominately from the central conduit and have also produced lava flows that travel far down the flanks. Pyroclastic flows and mudflows have commonly swept down many of the roughly 40 ravines that radiate from the summit and have often devastated populated lowland areas.

Taal Volcano has had 33 recorded eruptions since 1572. A devastating eruption occurred in 1911, which claimed more than a thousand lives. The deposits of that eruption consist of a yellowish, fairly decomposed (nonjuvenile) tephra with a high sulfur content. The most recent period of activity lasted from 1965 to 1977, and was characterized by the interaction of magma with the lake water, which produced violent phreatic and phreatomagmatic eruptions. The volcano was dormant from 1977 then showed signs of unrest since 1991 with strong seismic activity and ground-fracturing events, as well as the formation of small mud geysers on parts of the island. An eruption occurred in January 2020.

Kanlaon Volcano, the most active volcano in the central Philippines, has erupted 25 times since 1866. Eruptions are typically phreatic explosions of small-to-moderate size that produce minor ash falls near the volcano. On August 10, 1996, Kanlaon erupted without warning, killing 3 persons who were among 24 mountain climbers trapped near the summit. On June 3, 2024, Mt. Kanlaon erupted, displacing more than 1,000 people.

=== Indonesia ===
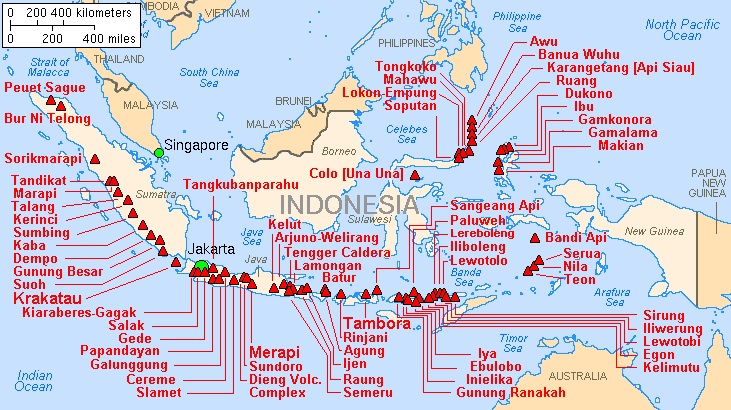
Major volcanoes in Indonesia

Indonesia is located where the Ring of Fire around the Pacific Ocean meets the Alpide belt (which runs from Southeast Asia to Southwest Europe).

The eastern islands of Indonesia (Sulawesi, the Lesser Sunda Islands (excluding Bali, Lombok, Sumbawa and Sangeang), Halmahera, the Banda Islands and the Sangihe Islands) are geologically associated with subduction of the Pacific plate or its related minor plates and, therefore, the eastern islands are often regarded as part of the Ring of Fire.

The western islands of Indonesia (the Sunda Arc of Sumatra, Krakatoa, Java, Bali, Lombok, Sumbawa and Sangeang) are located north of a subduction zone in the Indian Ocean. Although news media, popular science publications and some geologists include the western islands (and their notable volcanoes such as Krakatoa, Merapi, Tambora and Toba) in the Ring of Fire, geologists often exclude the western islands from the Ring; instead the western islands are often included in the Alpide belt.

== Islands in the southwest Pacific Ocean ==
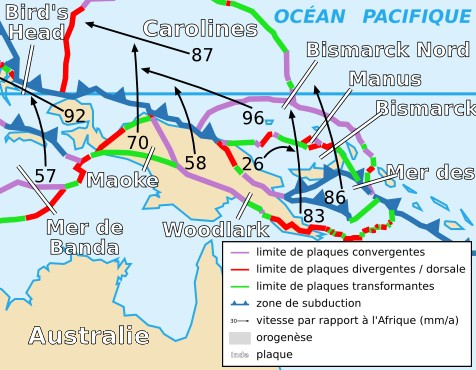
Papua New Guinea and tectonic plates: Pacific plate, Australian plate, Caroline plate, Banda Sea plate (as "Mer de Banda"), Woodlark plate, Bird's Head plate, Maoke plate, Solomon Sea plate, North Bismarck plate, South Bismarck plate and Manus plate (in French)

=== Fiji ===
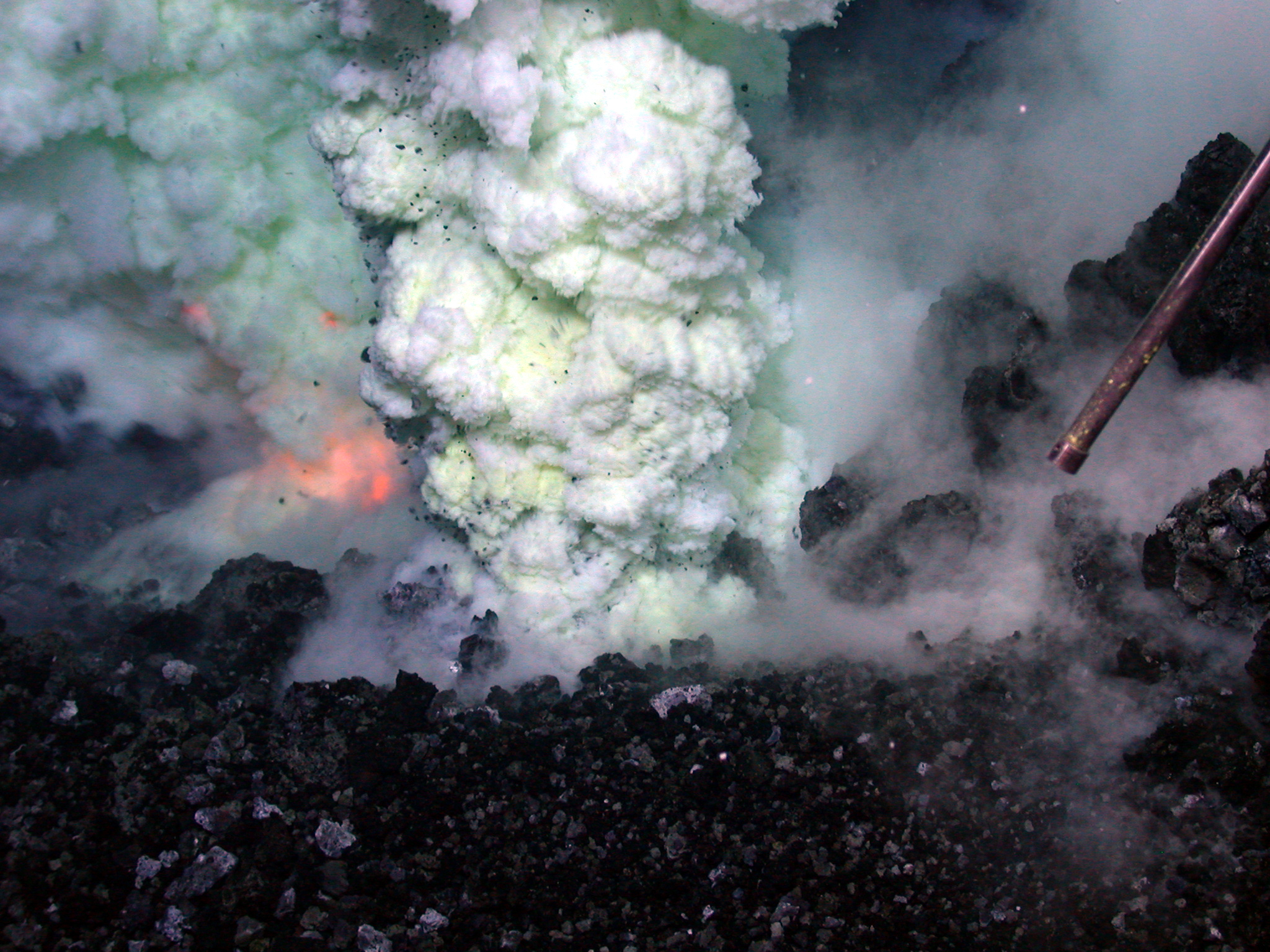
Volcanic eruption at West Mata submarine volcano between Samoa and Tonga, 2010

=== New Zealand ===
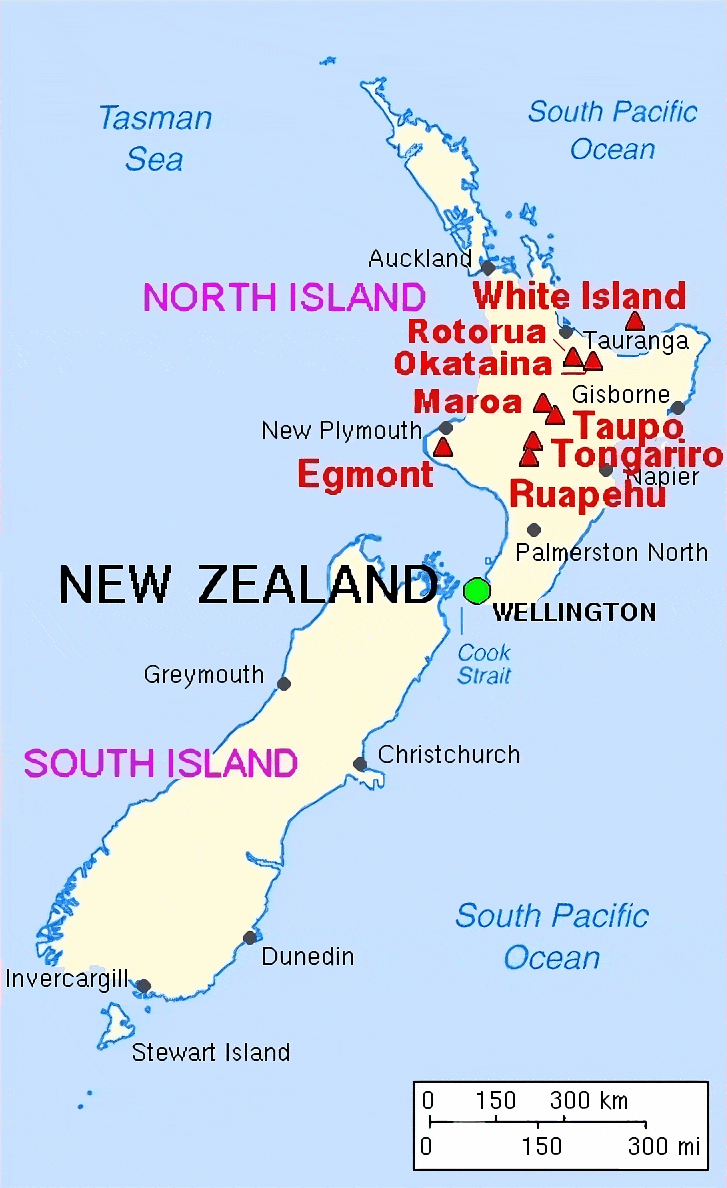
Major volcanoes of New Zealand

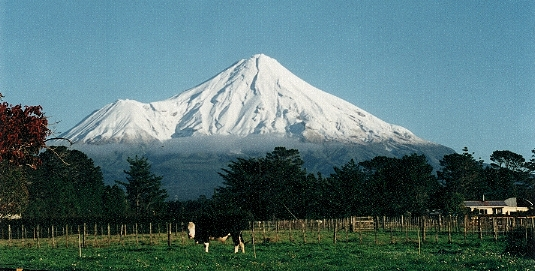
View of Mount Taranaki from Stratford

New Zealand contains the world's strongest concentration of youthful rhyolitic volcanoes, and voluminous sheets of tuff blanket much of the North Island. The earliest historically dated eruption was at Whakaari/White Island in 1826, followed in 1886 by the country's largest historical eruption at Mount Tarawera. Much of the region north of New Zealand's North Island is made up of seamounts and small islands, including 16 submarine volcanoes. In the last 1.6 million years, most of New Zealand's volcanism is from the Taupō Volcanic Zone.

Mount Ruapehu, at the southern end of the Taupō Volcanic Zone, is one of the most active volcanoes in New Zealand. It began erupting at least 250,000 years ago. In recorded history, major eruptions have been about 50 years apart, in 1895, 1945, and 1995–1996. Minor eruptions are frequent, with at least 60 since 1945. Some of the minor eruptions in the 1970s generated small ash falls and lahars that damaged ski fields. Between major eruptions, a warm acidic crater lake forms, fed by melting snow. Major eruptions may completely expel the lake water. Where a major eruption has deposited a tephra dam across the lake's outlet, the dam may collapse after the lake has refilled and risen above the level of its normal outlet, the outrush of water causing a large lahar. The most notable lahar caused the Tangiwai disaster on December 24, 1953, when 151 people aboard a Wellington to Auckland express train were killed after the lahar destroyed the Tangiwai rail bridge just moments before the train was due. In 2000, the ERLAWS system was installed on the mountain to detect such a collapse and alert the relevant authorities.

The Auckland volcanic field on the North Island of New Zealand has produced a diverse array of explosive craters, scoria cones, and lava flows. Currently dormant, the field is likely to erupt again within the next "hundreds to thousands of years", a very short timeframe in geologic terms. The field contains at least 40 volcanoes, most recently active about 600 years ago at Rangitoto Island, erupting 2.3 km^{3} (0.55 mi^{3}) of lava.

== Soil ==
The soils of the Pacific Ring of Fire include andosols, also known as andisols; they have formed by the weathering of volcanic ash. Andosols contain large proportions of volcanic glass. The Ring of Fire is the world's main location for this soil type, which typically has good levels of fertility.

== See also ==
- Decade Volcanoes – Set of volcanoes considered especially dangerous
- Deep Earth Carbon Degassing Project – Scientific project studying carbon transfer from Earth's interior
- Geology of the Pacific Northwest
- Pacific Rim – Land area comprising the rim of the Pacific Ocean
