= List of volcanoes in Canada =

The following is an incomplete list of volcanoes found in mainland Canada, in the Canadian islands and in Canadian waters. All but two provinces, Prince Edward Island and Manitoba, have at least one volcano.

== Alberta ==
| Name | Elevation | | Location | Last eruption |
| Name | Metres | Feet | Coordinates | Last eruption |
|---|---|---|---|---|
| BH225 pipe | – | - | – | Late Cretaceous |
| BH229 pipe | – | - | – | Late Cretaceous |
| BH230 pipe | – | - | – | Paleocene |
| BH155 pipe | – | - | – | - |
| BM2 pipe | – | - | – | Paleocene |
| BM3 pipe | – | - | – | - |
| BM16 pipe | – | - | – | - |
| Dragon pipe | – | - | – | Late Cretaceous |
| Kendu pipe | – | - | – | Late Cretaceous |
| K1A pipe | – | - | – | Paleocene |
| K1B pipe | – | - | – | Paleocene |
| K14A pipe | – | - | – | Late Cretaceous |
| K14B pipe | – | - | – | Late Cretaceous |
| K14C pipe | – | - | – | Late Cretaceous |
| K160 pipe | – | - | – | - |
| K2 pipe | – | - | – | Paleocene |
| K251 pipe | – | - | – | Late Cretaceous |
| K252 pipe | – | - | – | Late Cretaceous |
| K296 pipe | – | - | – | - |
| K3 pipe | – | - | – | Paleocene |
| K32 pipe | – | - | – | - |
| K300 pipe | – | - | – | - |
| K4A pipe | – | - | – | Late Cretaceous |
| K4B pipe | – | - | – | Late Cretaceous |
| K4C pipe | – | - | – | Late Cretaceous |
| K5B pipe | – | - | – | Late Cretaceous |
| K5A pipe | – | - | – | Late Cretaceous |
| K6 pipe | – | - | – | Late Cretaceous |
| K7A pipe | – | - | – | Late Cretaceous |
| K7B pipe | – | - | – | Late Cretaceous |
| K7C pipe | – | - | – | Late Cretaceous |
| K8 pipe | – | - | – | - |
| K10 pipe | – | - | – | - |
| K11 pipe | – | - | – | Late Cretaceous |
| K15 pipe | – | - | – | - |
| K19 pipe | – | - | – | Paleocene |
| K91 pipe | – | - | – | Late Cretaceous |
| K92 pipe | – | - | – | - |
| K93 pipe | – | - | – | - |
| K95 pipe | – | - | – | - |
| Legend pipe | – | - | – | Late Cretaceous |
| LL8 pipe | – | - | – | Late Cretaceous |
| Phoenix pipe | – | - | – | Late Cretaceous |
| Valkyrie pipe | – | - | – | Late Cretaceous |
| WP pipe | – | - | – | Late Cretaceous |
| Xena pipe | – | - | – | Late Cretaceous |

== British Columbia ==
| Name | Elevation | | Location | Last eruption |
| Name | Metres | Feet | Coordinates | Last eruption |
|---|---|---|---|---|
| Anahim Peak | 1897 | 6224 | 52.44°N 125.41°W | Miocene |
| Armadillo Peak | 2210 | 7251 | 57.53°N 130.55°W | Miocene |
| Ash Mountain | 2125 | 6550 | 59.27°N 130.05°W | Pleistocene |
| The Ash Pit | 1580 | 5184 | 57.45°N 130.78°W | Holocene |
| Atwell Peak | 2655 | 8711 | 49.50°N 123.33°W | Pleistocene |
| Bennett Lake Volcanic Complex | 1500 | 4900 | 60.3°N 134.52°W | Eocene |
| Black Dome Mountain | 2252 | 7388 | 51.19°N 122.29°W | Pliocene |
| The Black Tusk | 2319 | 7608 | 49.97°N 123.04°W | Pleistocene |
| Blackfoot diatreme | – | – | 49.58°N 115.17°W | - |
| Baldface Mountain | 1798 | 5899 | 52.46°N 124.32°W | Pleistocene |
| Mount Boucherie | 758 | 2487 | 49.51°N 119.34°W | Paleocene |
| Bowie Seamount | -24 | -79 | 53.3°N 135.63°W | 18000 years ago |
| Mount Brew | 1757 | 5764 | 50.4°N 123.19°W | Pleistocene |
| Bridge River Cones | 2500 | 8202 | 50.80°N 123.40°W | Holocene |
| Buck Hill | 1585 | 5200 | 51.48°N 119.59°W | Pleistocene |
| Cache Hill | 2110 | 6923 | 57.53°N 130.67°W | Holocene |
| Mount Callaghan | 2409 | 7909 | 50.13°N 123.15°W | - |
| Camp Hill | 1880 | 6168 | 57.58°N 130.78°W | Holocene |
| Capricorn Mountain | 2551 | 8369 | 50.62°N 123.52°W | Pleistocene |
| Caribou Tuya | 1770 | 5807 | 59.24°N 130.56°W | Pleistocene |
| Cartoona Peak | 2305 | 7562 | 57.36°N 130.36°W | Miocene |
| The Castle | 798 | 2618 | 49.69°N 123.2°W | Pleistocene |
| Castle Rock | 1862 | 6109 | 57.84°N 131.15°W | Pleistocene |
| Cauldron Dome | 2233 | 7326 | 50.16°N 123.32°W | Pleistocene |
| Mount Cayley | 2377 | 7799 | 50.12°N 123.28°W | Pleistocene |
| Chakatah Creek Peak | 1815 | 5955 | 59.25°N 131.03°W | Pleistocene |
| Chelan Seamount | -1459 | -4787 | 49.45°N 131.32°W | - |
| Chikoida Mountain | 1927 | 6322 | 59.2°N 133.4°W | Cenozoic |
| Cinder Cliff | 1800 | 5906 | 57.75°N 130.57°W | Holocene |
| Cinder Cone | 1910 | 6266 | 49.97°N 123.00°W | Holocene |
| Cinder Mountain | 300 | 984 | 56.57°N 130.61°W | Pleistocene |
| Clinker Peak | 1992 | 6535 | 49.93°N 123.4°W | 9000 years ago |
| Cindercone Peak | 2033 | 6670 | 52.46°N 125.18°W | - |
| Clisbako Caldera Complex | – | – | 52.43°N 124.4°W | Eocene |
| Cocoa Crater | 2123 | 6965 | 57.39°N 130.42°W | Holocene |
| Coffee Crater | 2000 | 6562 | 57.63°N 130.67°W | Holocene |
| Cottonwood Peak | 1638 | 5374 | 59.40°N 130.25°W | Pleistocene |
| Cracker Creek Cone | 1895 | 5880 | 59.7°N 133.4°W | Holocene |
| Cross diatreme | 2200 | 7218 | 50.09°N 114.83°W | - |
| Crow Lagoon | 335 | 1099 | 54.7°N 130.23°W | Holocene |
| Dark Mountain | 1974 | 6476 | 58.64°N 129.35°W | Pleistocene |
| Dellwood Seamounts | -1474 | -4836 | 50.37°N 130.42°W | - |
| Devastator Peak | 2327 | 7635 | 50.59°N 123.53°W | Pleistocene |
| Dome Mountain | 1754 | 5755 | 58.45°N 129.59°W | Pleistocene |
| Mount Downton | 2375 | 7792 | 52.42°N 124.51°W | Pleistocene |
| Dragon Cone | 1830 | 6000 | 51.8°N 119.98°W | Holocene |
| Dufferin Island | 50 | 164 | 52.22°N 128.32°W | Holocene |
| Mount Edziza | 2787 | 9144 | 57.72°N 130.63°W | Pleistocene |
| Mount Edziza volcanic complex | 2787 | 9144 | 57.72°N 130.63°W | Holocene |
| Ember Ridge | 2348 | 7703 | 50.8°N 123.23°W | Pliocene |
| Enid Creek Cone | 1914 | 6280 | 58.38°N 129.52°W | Pleistocene |
| Eve Cone | 1702 | 5584 | 57.82°N 130.67°W | 700 CE |
| Exile Hill | 1874 | 6148 | 57.38°N 130.82°W | Pliocene |
| Explorer Seamount | -830 | -2723 | 49.5°N 130.48°W | - |
| Mount Fee | 2162 | 7093 | 50.90°N 123.24°W | Pleistocene |
| Fiftytwo Ridge | 1866 | 6188 | 51.93°N 119.89°W | Pleistocene |
| Mount Fitzgerald | 2641 | 8665 | 51.31°N 126.3°W | - |
| Flatiron | 730 | 2395 | 51.88°N 120.5°W | Pleistocene |
| Flourmill Cone | 1495 | 4905 | 52.5°N 120.32°W | Holocene |
| Franklin Glacier Complex | 2252 | 7388 | 51.20°N 125.24°W | Pliocene |
| Gabrielse Cone | 1600 | 5249 | 59.44°N 130.46°W | Holocene |
| Gage Hill | 1090 | 3576 | 52.5°N 120.1°W | Pleistocene |
| Mount Garibaldi | 2678 | 8786 | 49.84°N 123.1°W | Holocene |
| Glacier Dome | 2225 | 7300 | 57.77°N 130.58°W | Pleistocene |
| Glacier Pikes | 2145 | 7037 | 49.89°N 122.85°W | Pleistocene |
| Graham Seamount | -1474 | -4836 | 53.14°N 134.31°W | - |
| Grizzly Butte | 1412 | 4633 | 50.3°N 119.6°W | Holocene |
| HP diatreme | 2400 | 7874 | 51.41°N 116.57°W | - |
| Haddington Island | – | – | 50.36°N 127.2°W | Pliocene |
| Heart Peaks | 2012 | 6601 | 58.60°N 131.97°W | Pleistocene |
| Heck Seamount | 1320 | 4331 | 48.3°N 130.1°W | - |
| Helmet Peak | 318 | 1043 | 52.35°N 128.35°W | Holocene |
| Hodgkins Seamount | -790 | -2592 | 53.3°N 136.5°W | Pliocene |
| Hoodoo Mountain | 1850 | 6070 | 56.78°N 131.28°W | 7050 years ago |
| Hyalo Ridge | 2012 | 6601 | 52.11°N 120.36°W | Pleistocene |
| IGC Centre | 2074 | 6804 | 57.56°N 130.62°W | Miocene |
| Ice Peak | 2526 | 8287 | 57.70°N 130.63°W | Holocene |
| Icefall Cone | 2285 | 7497 | 57.70°N 130.6°W | Holocene |
| Ida Ridge | 1981 | 6499 | 51.8°N 119.94°W | Pleistocene |
| Ilgachuz Range | 2410 | 7907 | 52.47°N 125.19°W | Pliocene |
| Iskut-Unuk River Cones | 1880 | 6168 | 56.52°N 130.33°W | 1800 CE (?) |
| Isspah Butte | 1673 | 5489 | 59.4°N 131.18°W | Pleistocene |
| Itcha Mountain | 2290 | 7513 | 52.43°N 124.49°W | Pleistocene |
| Itcha Range | 2375 | 7792 | 52.42°N 124.5°W | Pleistocene |
| Jack's Jump | 1895 | 6217 | 52.12°N 120.5°W | Pleistocene |
| Mount Job | 2493 | 8180 | 50.62°N 123.55°W | Pleistocene |
| Mount Josephine | 1767 | 5797 | 59.6°N 130.7°W | Pleistocene |
| Kana Cone | 1100 | 3609 | 57.90°N 130.62°W | Holocene |
| Kawdy Mountain | 1936 | 6352 | 58.88°N 131.23°W | Pleistocene |
| Keda Cone | 1980 | 6496 | 57.6°N 130.68°W | Holocene |
| Mount Kinch | 2470 | 8104 | 51.25°N 126.10°W | - |
| Kitasu Hill | 235 | 771 | 52.50°N 128.73°W | Holocene |
| Klastline Cone | 1400 | 4593 | 57.78°N 130.5°W | Pleistocene |
| Klinkit Creek Peak | 1519 | 4984 | 59.47°N 131.28°W | Pleistocene |
| Klinkit Lake Peak | 1516 | 4974 | 59.49°N 131.1°W | Pleistocene |
| Kostal Cone | 1440 | 4724 | 52.17°N 119.94°W | 1550 (?) |
| Level Mountain | 2190 | 7185 | 58.25°N 131.21°W | Holocene (?) |
| Lightning Peak | 2139 | 7018 | 49.88°N 118.53°W | Pliocene |
| Little Bear Mountain | 1180 | 3875 | 56.80°N 131.3°W | Pleistocene |
| Little Eagle Cone | 1545 | 5069 | 58.52°N 129.71°W | Pleistocene |
| Little Ring Mountain | 2165 | 7103 | 50.16°N 123.18°W | Unknown |
| Llangorse Mountain | 1962 | 6437 | 59.32°N 132.9°W | Cenozoic |
| Lone Butte | 1237 | 4058 | 51.33°N 131.11°W | Miocene |
| Mount MacKenzie | 2143 | 7031 | 52.37°N 126.5°W | Miocene |
| Machmel River Cone | 1800 | 5906 | 51.51°N 126.21°W | Holocene |
| Maitland Volcano | 2514 | 8248 | 57.4°N 129.7°W | Pliocene |
| Maquinna | -2500 | -8202 | – | Holocene |
| Mathews Tuya | 1676 | 5499 | 59.20°N 130.43°W | Pleistocene |
| McLeod Hill | 1284 | 4213 | 52.02°N 120.01°W | Pleistocene |
| Mount Meager massif | 2680 | 8793 | 50.63°N 123.5°W | 410 BCE |
| Meehaz Mountain | 1608 | 5276 | 59.1°N 131.27°W | Pleistocene |
| Meszah Peak | 2166 | 7106 | 58.48°N 131.43°W | Pleistocene |
| Moraine Cone | 2135 | 7005 | 57.77°N 130.62°W | Holocene |
| Mosquito Mound | 1065 | 3494 | 52.02°N 120.18°W | Pleistocene |
| Nahta Cone | 1690 | 5545 | 57.32°N 130.82°W | Holocene |
| Nanook Dome | 2710 | 8891 | 57.72°N 130.6°W | Pleistocene |
| Nazko Cone | 1230 | 4035 | 52.55°N 123.44°W | 5220 BCE |
| Nuthinaw Mountain | 1732 | 5682 | 58.47°N 131.3°W | Pleistocene |
| Mount Noel | 2541 | 8337 | 50.42°N 122.51°W | Miocene |
| Opal Cone | 1736 | 5696 | 49.82°N 122.97°W | 9300 years ago |
| Oshawa Seamount | 2127 | 6978 | 53.14°N 134.31°W | - |
| Ospika pipe | 1550 | 5085 | 56.27°N 123.45°W | - |
| Outcast Hill | 1800 | 5906 | 57.23°N 130.46°W | Pleistocene |
| Mount Overill | 2354 | 7723 | 51.28°N 126.7°W | - |
| Pali Dome | 1767 | 5797 | 50.13°N 123.25°W | Pleistocene |
| Peak 1924 | 1565 | 5135 | 59.4°N 130.38°W | Pleistocene |
| Peak 2050 | 2036 | 6680 | 59.39°N 130.18°W | Pleistocene |
| Peak 2166 | 2064 | 6800 | 59.31°N 130.59°W | Pleistocene |
| Peirce Seamount | -1800 | -5906 | 53.44°N 136.32°W | - |
| Perkin's Pillar | 2430 | 7972 | 50.37°N 123.31°W | - |
| Pharaoh Dome | 2200 | 7218 | 57.65°N 130.6°W | Pleistocene |
| Pillow Creek | 1829 | 6001 | 52.02°N 119.84°W | Pleistocene |
| Pillow Ridge | 2400 | 7874 | 57.76°N 130.64°W | Pleistocene |
| Plinth Peak | 2677 | 8783 | 50.64°N 123.51°W | 410 BCE |
| Pointed Stick Cone | 1820 | 5971 | 52.24°N 120.08°W | Holocene |
| Powder Mountain | 2347 | 7700 | 50.8°N 123.16°W | - |
| Mount Price | 2052 | 6732 | 49.92°N 123.3°W | 9000 years ago |
| Pylon Peak | 2481 | 8140 | 50.35°N 123.31°W | Pleistocene |
| Pyramid Dome | 2199 | 7215 | 57.77°N 130.57°W | Pleistocene |
| Pyramid Mountain | 240 | 1103 | 51.99°N 120.1°W | Pleistocene |
| Pyroclastic Peak | 2349 | 7707 | 50.6°N 123.17°W | Pleistocene |
| Rainbow Range | 2495 | 8186 | 52.43°N 125.46°W | Miocene |
| Ray Mountain | 2050 | 6726 | 52.24°N 120.11°W | Pleistocene |
| Ridge Cone | 2285 | 7497 | 57.68°N 130.62°W | Holocene |
| Ring Mountain | 2192 | 7192 | 50.13°N 123.17°W | Unknown |
| Round Mountain | 1646 | 5400 | 49.45°N 123.1°W | Pleistocene |
| Ruby Mountain | 1895 | 6217 | 59.68°N 123.33°W | 1898 CE (?) |
| Satah Mountain | 1921 | 6302 | 52.28°N 124.41°W | Unknown |
| The Saucer | 1920 | 6299 | 57.63°N 130.63°W | Holocene |
| Seminole Seamount | -1653 | -5423 | 49.46°N 129.5°W | - |
| Sezill Volcano | 2050 | 6726 | 57.59°N 130.62°W | Miocene |
| Sham Hill | 60 | 197 | 50.9°N 123.52°W | Pleistocene |
| Sidas Cone | 1540 | 5052 | 57.87°N 130.63°W | Holocene |
| Silverthrone Mountain | 3160 | 10367 | 51.31°N 126.6°W | Unknown |
| Silverthrone Caldera | 3160 | 10367 | 51.26°N 126.18°W | Unknown |
| Skoatl Point | 1640 | 5381 | 51.9°N 120.25°W | - |
| Slag Hill | 2088 | 6850 | 50.19°N 123.3°W | Pleistocene |
| Sleet Cone | 1783 | 5850 | 57.78°N 130.55°W | Holocene |
| Mount Somolenko | 2658 | 8720 | 51.28°N 126.6°W | - |
| Source Hill | 1630 | 5348 | 57.28°N 130.82°W | Pleistocene |
| South Tuya | 1829 | 5637 | 59.2°N 130.5°W | Pleistocene |
| Spanish Bonk | 1770 | 5807 | 52.13°N 120.37°W | Pleistocene |
| Spanish Lake Centre | 1770 | 5807 | 52.07°N 120.31°W | Holocene |
| Spanish Mump | 1800 | 5906 | 52.16°N 120.33°W | Pleistocene |
| Spectrum Range | 2430 | 7972 | 57.26°N 130.41°W | Unknown |
| The Sphinx | 1525 | 5003 | 49.93°N 122.85°W | Pleistocene |
| Sphinx Dome | 2380 | 7808 | 57.75°N 130.58°W | Pleistocene |
| Stirni Seamount | -1710 | -5610 | 49.8°N 132.18°W | - |
| Stockton Hill | 1574 | 5164 | 51.10°N 120.33°W | - |
| Storm Cone | 2135 | 7005 | 57.77°N 130.63°W | Holocene |
| The Table | 1645 | 5397 | 49.9°N 123.2°W | Pleistocene |
| Tadeda Peak | 2194 | 7198 | 57.54°N 130.61°W | Miocene |
| Tadekho Hill | 1860 | 6102 | 57.35°N 130.78°W | Pleistocene |
| Tennena Cone | 2350 | 7710 | 57.68°N 130.67°W | Holocene |
| The Thumb | 1854 | 6083 | 56.16°N 126.7°W | Unknown |
| Toozaza Peak | 2182 | 7182 | 59.50°N 130.3°W | Pleistocene |
| Tow Hill | 125 | 410 | 54.4°N 131.47°W | Pliocene |
| Triangle Dome | 2680 | 8793 | 57.72°N 130.65°W | Pleistocene |
| Triplex Cones | 1785 | 5856 | 57.80°N 130.62°W | Holocene |
| Tseax Cone | 600 | 1969 | 55.12°N 126.9°W | 1750–1775 CE |
| Tsekone Ridge | 1920 | 6299 | 57.77°N 130.69°W | Pleistocene |
| Tuber Hill | 2500 | 8202 | 50.93°N 123.44°W | Pleistocene |
| Tucker Seamount | -1242 | -4075 | 49.5°N 133.3°W | - |
| Tutsingale Mountain | 1722 | 5650 | 58.78°N 130.87°W | Pleistocene |
| Tuya Butte | 1685 | 5528 | 59.13°N 130.55°W | Pleistocene |
| Tuzo Wilson Seamounts | -1410 | -4626 | 51.4°N 130.9°W | Holocene |
| Twin Cone | 1430 | 4692 | 57.70°N 130.64°W | Holocene |
| Union Seamount | -293 | -961 | 49.35°N 132.45°W | - |
| Volcanic Creek Cone | 1600 | 5249 | 59.75°N 133.45°W | Holocene |
| The Volcano | 1330 | 4364 | 56.42°N 130.85°W | 1880 (?) |
| Vulcan's Thumb | 2290 | 7500 | 50.11°N 123.29°W | Pleistocene |
| Watts Point volcanic centre | 240 | 800 | 49.65°N 123.21°W | Pleistocene |
| Wetalth Ridge | 1830 | 6004 | 57.32°N 130.78°W | Pleistocene |
| White Creek Cone | 1712 | 5617 | 52.55°N 124.84°W | Pleistocene |
| White Horse Bluff | 200 | 6200 | 51.90°N 120.11°W | Pleistocene |
| Williams Cone | 2080 | 6824 | 57.78°N 130.6°W | 600 CE |
| Yeda Peak | 2263 | 7425 | 57.38°N 130.68°W | Pliocene |

== New Brunswick ==
| Name | Elevation | | Location | Last eruption |
| Name | Metres | Feet | Coordinates | Last eruption |
|---|---|---|---|---|
| Flat Landing Brook Formation | – | – | – | Middle Ordovician |
| Mount Pleasant Caldera | 248 | 815 | 45°44′16″N 67°19′50″W | Late Devonian |
| Sugarloaf Mountain | 305 | 1,001 | 47°59′21.9″N 66°41′15.4″W | Late Devonian |

== Newfoundland and Labrador ==
| Name | Elevation | | Location | Last eruption |
| Name | Metres | Feet | Coordinates | Last eruption |
|---|---|---|---|---|
| Flowers River caldera complex | – | - | – | - |
| Fogo Seamounts | – | - | 41°45′47.4″N 52°16′51.6″W | Cretaceous |
| Newfoundland Seamounts | – | - | 43°41′27.9″N 45°24′15″W | Cretaceous |
| Springdale Caldera | – | - | – | Early Silurian |

== Northwest Territories ==
| Name | Elevation | | Location | Last eruption |
| Name | Metres | Feet | Coordinates | Last eruption |
|---|---|---|---|---|
| Aristifats Diatreme | – | - | – | Paleoproterozoic |
| Artemisia pipe | – | - | – | - |
| Back River volcanic complex | – | - | 65°N 108°W | Archean |
| Gahcho Kué kimberlite pipes | – | - | – | Cambrian |
| Kam Group | – | - | – | Archean |
| Misery Kimberlite Complex | – | - | – | Paleogene |
| Mountain Diatreme | – | - | – | - |

== Nova Scotia ==
| Name | Elevation | | Location | Last eruption |
| Name | Metres | Feet | Coordinates | Last eruption |
|---|---|---|---|---|
| Scatarie Bank | – | - | 45°49′N 59°15′W | Cretaceous |

== Nunavut ==
| Name | Elevation | | Location | Last eruption |
| Name | Metres | Feet | Coordinates | Last eruption |
|---|---|---|---|---|
| Back River volcanic complex | – | - | 65°N 108°W | Archean |
| Elwin Bay diatreme | – | - | 73°30′N 90°56′W | - |
| Jericho pipe | – | - | – | - |

== Ontario ==
| Name | Elevation | | Location | Last eruption |
| Name | Metres | Feet | Coordinates | Last eruption |
|---|---|---|---|---|
| Sturgeon Lake Caldera | – | - | 49°52′13″N 91°00′10″W | Neoarchean |
| Manitou Islands | – | - | 46°15′57″N 79°34′13″W | - |
| Callander Bay | – | - | 46°12′47″N 79°23′03″W | Proterozoic |
| Blake River Megacaldera Complex | – | - | 48°14′58″N 79°20′29″W | Neoarchean |
| Misema Caldera | – | - | 48°14′58″N 79°24′15″W | Neoarchean |
| Attawapiskat kimberlite field | – | - | 52°49′14″N 83°53′00″W | Jurassic |
| Lake Timiskaming kimberlite field | – | - | 47°18′36″N 79°29′03″W | Jurassic |
| Deadhorse Creek diatreme complex | – | - | 48°44′49″N 86°55′29″W | - |
| Kirkland Lake kimberlite field | – | - | 48°10′54″N 80°01′20″W | Jurassic |

== Quebec ==
| Name | Elevation | | Location | Last eruption |
| Name | Metres | Feet | Coordinates | Last eruption |
|---|---|---|---|---|
| Lac des Vents volcanic complex | – | - | 51°19′59″N 69°15′15″W | - |
| Blake River Megacaldera Complex | – | - | 48°14′58″N 79°20′29″W | Neoarchean |
| New Senator Caldera | – | - | 48°26′53″N 79°24′15″W | Neoarchean |
| Noranda Caldera | – | - | 48°17′44″N 79°08′26″W | Neoarchean |
| Misema Caldera | – | - | 48°14′58″N 79°24′15″W | Neoarchean |
| Lake Timiskaming kimberlite field | – | - | 47°18′36″N 79°29′03″W | Jurassic |
| Hunter Mine caldera | – | - | 48°37′15″N 79°23′26″W | Archean |

== Saskatchewan ==
| Name | Elevation | | Location | Last eruption |
| Name | Metres | Feet | Coordinates | Last eruption |
|---|---|---|---|---|
| Fort à la Corne kimberlite field | – | - | – | Cretaceous |

== Yukon ==
| Name | Elevation | | Location | Last eruption |
| Name | Metres | Feet | Coordinates | Last eruption |
|---|---|---|---|---|
| Alligator Lake Volcanic Complex | 2217 | 7274 | 60.42°N 135.42°W | Unknown |
| Bennett Lake Volcanic Complex | 1500 | 4900 | 60.3°N 134.52°W | Eocene |
| Felsite Peak | 2530 | 8301 | 60.67°N 138.23°W | Pliocene |
| Mount Harper | 1845 | 6053 | 64.40°N 139.52°W | Late Proterozoic |
| Ibex Mountain | 2108 | 6909 | 60.53°N 135.52°W | Pleistocene |
| Mount McNeil | 2300 | 7546 | 60.8°N 135.26°W | Tertiary |
| Montana Mountain | 2205 | 7234 | 60.3°N 134.41°W | Late Cretaceous |
| Mount Skukum Volcanic Complex | 2382 | 7815 | 60.11°N 135.29°W | Eocene |
| Mount Nansen | 1827 | 5994 | 62.6°N 137.18°W | Late Cretaceous |
| Ne Ch'e Ddhawa | 712 | 2336 | 62.75°N 137.27°W | Pleistocene |
| Rabbit Mountain | 2090 | 6857 | 61.88°N 140.96°W | Pliocene |
| Volcano Mountain | 1239 | 4065 | 62.93°N 137.37°W | Holocene |

== See also ==
- Outline of Canada
- Bibliography of Canada
- Volcanism of Canada
  - Volcanism of Northern Canada
  - Volcanism of Western Canada
  - Volcanism of Eastern Canada
  - List of Northern Cordilleran volcanoes
- List of mountains in Canada
- List of Cascade volcanoes
