= Yellowknife greenstone belt =

Geological region of the Northwest Territories, Canada

The Yellowknife greenstone belt, also referred to as the Yellowknife volcanic belt, is an Archean greenstone belt in the southern Slave craton, Northwest Territories, Canada. It is mostly made of mafic volcanic rocks (basalt and andesite) and is bordered to the east by batholithic intrusions of the Western Granodiorite Complex and beyond to the north by the Duckfish Lake Granite. Most of the Yellowknife townsite and the Con and Giant gold mines are within the Kam Group. The Yellowknife greenstone belt stands out as a positive topographic feature.

The Yellowknife greenstone belt is composed of metavolcanic rocks of the more than 2.70 billion-year-old Kam Group (consisting of the Chan, Crestaurum, Townsite and Yellowknife Bay formations) and the 2.69 to 2.66 billion-year-old Banting Group (including the Ingraham, Walsh and Prosperous formations). It is crosscut extensively by syn to post-volcanic gabbro dikes and sills and quartz-feldspar porphyry dikes. Gold deposits occur in quartz-carbonate-bearing shear zones within the mafic rocks, and quartz lodes within greywacke-mudstone turbidites.

== See also ==
- List of volcanoes in Canada
- Volcanism of Northern Canada
- Geology of the Northwest Territories
- List of greenstone belts
