= Chelan Seamount =

Submerged volcano in the Pacific Ocean off the coast of Vancouver Island

- Location within British Columbia
- Summit depth: 1,459 m (4,787 ft)

Location
- Location: North Pacific Ocean
- Coordinates: 49°47′36″N 131°46′10″W
- Country: Canada

Geology
- Type: Submarine volcano

The Chelan Seamount is a seamount located in the Pacific Ocean off the coast of northern Vancouver Island, British Columbia, Canada.

== See also ==
- Volcanism in Canada
- List of volcanoes in Canada
