= Elwin Bay diatreme =

Coordinates: 73°30′N 090°56′W

The Elwin Bay diatreme, also called the Elwin Bay kimberlite, is a small post-Silurian kimberlite diatreme located approximately 1 km (0.62 mi) south of Elwin Bay at the eastern margin of Somerset Island, Nunavut, Canada. It has a diameter of 200 m (656 ft).

== See also ==
- Volcanism in Canada
- List of volcanoes in Canada
