= Union Seamount =

Seamount off the coast of British Columbia, Canada

- Location within British Columbia
- Summit depth: 293 m (961 ft)

Location
- Location: North Pacific Ocean
- Coordinates: 49°35′N 132°45′W
- Country: Canada

Geology
- Type: Submarine volcano

The Union Seamount is a seamount located in the Pacific Ocean off the coast of northern Vancouver Island, British Columbia, Canada.

== See also ==
- Volcanism of Canada
- Volcanism of Western Canada
- List of volcanoes in Canada
