= Lightning Peak (British Columbia) =

Mountain in British Columbia, Canada

- Location within British Columbia
- Interactive map of Lightning Peak

Highest point
- Elevation: 2,139 m (7,018 ft)
- Prominence: 154 m (505 ft)
- Coordinates: 49°52′44.0″N 118°31′20.2″W

Geography
- Location: British Columbia, Canada
- District: Osoyoos Division Yale Land District
- Topo map: NTS 82E15 Damfino Creek

Geology
- Rock age: Pliocene
- Mountain type: Outcrop
- Last eruption: Pliocene

Lightning Peak is a summit in the Midway Range of the Monashee Mountains, British Columbia, Canada. It is an eroded volcanic outcrop in the Chilcotin Group. The mountain is located 30 km (19 mi) west of Needles, and 70 km (43 mi) east of Downtown Kelowna. Peridot can be found at this peak. Lightning Peak is thought to have formed as a result of extension of the crust behind the coastal subduction zone and last erupted during the Pliocene. Like most volcanoes in British Columbia, Lightning Peak is part of the Pacific Ring of Fire, that includes over 160 active volcanoes.

== See also ==
- List of volcanoes in Canada
- Volcanism in Canada
- Volcanism in Western Canada
