= K6 pipe =

Diatreme in Canada

K6 pipe is a diamondiferous diatreme in the Buffalo Head Hills kimberlite field of Northern Alberta, Canada. It is thought to have formed about 85 million years ago when this part of Alberta was volcanically active during the Late Cretaceous period. It is typical of melts that originated from the lower mantle.

== See also ==
- List of volcanoes in Canada
- Volcanism of Western Canada
