= Dellwood Seamounts =

Seamount range in the Pacific Ocean northwest of Vancouver Island, Canada

- Location within British Columbia
- Summit depth: 1,474 m (4,836 ft)

Location
- Location: North Pacific Ocean
- Coordinates: 50°37′N 130°42′W
- Country: Canada

Geology
- Type: Submarine volcanoes

The Dellwood Seamounts are a seamount range located in the Pacific Ocean northwest of Vancouver Island, British Columbia, Canada. They are also known as the Dellwood Seamount Range or the Dellwood Seamount Chain.

== See also ==
- Volcanism of Canada
- Volcanism of Western Canada
- List of volcanoes in Canada
