= Ospika pipe =

Highest point
- Elevation: ~1,550 m (5,085 ft)
- Listing: List of volcanoes in Canada
- Coordinates: 56°27′00″N 123°45′00″W

Geography
- Location: British Columbia, Canada

Geology
- Mountain type: Diatreme

The Ospika pipe is a small composite diatreme in northern British Columbia, Canada, located approximately 140 km (87 mi) north-northwest of Mackenzie, on the east side of Williston Lake between the Peace Reach and Ospika River.

== See also ==
- Volcanism in Canada
- Kechika River
