= Lake Timiskaming kimberlite field =

Volcanic field in Canada

Coordinates: 47.546065°N 79.664998°W

The Lake Timiskaming kimberlite field is Canada's southernmost kimberlite field, located in Northeastern Ontario and western Quebec, Canada. It is within the Lake Timiskaming Structural Zone which contains over 50 kimberlite pipes, several of which are diamondiferous. The Lake Timiskaming kimberlite field formed about 147 million years ago when the North American Plate moved westward over the long-lived New England hotspot, also referred to as the Great Meteor hotspot.

== See also ==
- Volcanism of Canada
- Volcanism of Eastern Canada
- List of volcanoes in Canada
- List of volcanic fields
- Victor Diamond Mine
