= Aristifats Diatreme =

The Aristifats Diatreme is a diatreme in the Northwest Territories, Canada, located about 100 km (62 mi) east of Yellowknife. It is thought to have formed about 1,850 million years ago with the eruption of pyroclastic breccia.

== See also ==
- List of volcanoes in Canada
- Volcanology of Canada
- Volcanology of Northern Canada
