= Springdale Caldera =

The Springdale Caldera is a large Early Silurian caldera in west-central Newfoundland, Canada. It is at least 60 km (37 mi) long and 35 km (22 mi) wide, covering an area of more than 2,000 km^{2} (770 sq mi). It is one of the few calderas in Newfoundland that form a large Silurian age volcanic field. Basalt, andesite, rhyolite, pyroclastic rocks, debris flows, breccias and red sandstone are present at the Springdale Caldera.

== See also ==
- Volcanism of Canada
- Volcanism of Eastern Canada
- List of volcanoes in Canada
