= Pillow Creek =

Pillow Creek is a creek in east-central British Columbia, Canada, located in the northeast corner of Wells Gray Provincial Park.

Pillow Creek is home to a subglacial volcano that formed and last erupted during the Pleistocene period.

== See also ==
- List of volcanoes in Canada
- Volcanism of Canada
- Volcanism of Western Canada
