= Kam Group =

Geological region in Northwest Territories, Canada

The Kam Group is a 10 km (6 mi) thick Archean volcanic group in the Yellowknife greenstone belt of the Northwest Territories, Canada. It consists of tholeiitic mafic and subordinate felsic volcanic rocks that were erupted in a submarine environment about 2706 million years ago.

== See also ==
- List of volcanoes in Canada
- Volcanism of Northern Canada
