= Mount Noel =

Mountain in Canada

- Location within British Columbia

Highest point
- Elevation: 2,541 m (8,337 ft)
- Prominence: 696 m (2,283 ft)
- Listing: Mountains of British Columbia
- Coordinates: 50°42′46″N 122°51′26″W

Geography
- Location: Bridge River Country, British Columbia, Canada
- District: Lillooet Land District
- Parent range: Pacific Ranges
- Topo map: NTS 92J10 Birkenhead Lake

Geology
- Rock age: Miocene
- Mountain type: Complex volcano
- Volcanic zone: Chilcotin Group

Climbing
- First ascent: Unknown

Mount Noel is a Miocene volcanic complex in the Chilcotin Group in British Columbia, Canada, located 7 km (4 mi) southwest of Bralorne and north of a tributary of Noel Creek. It is 150 km (93 mi) east of the Garibaldi Volcanic Belt and is made up of flat-lying, columnar-jointed basalt flows along with debris flows and minor pyroclastic rocks. Mount Noel is thought to have formed as a result of back-arc extension behind the Cascadia subduction zone.

== See also ==
- List of volcanoes in Canada
- Volcanism of Canada
- Volcanism of Western Canada
