= Clisbako Caldera Complex =

Coordinates: 52°43′N 124°04′W

The Clisbako Caldera Complex (also called the Cheslatta Caldera Complex) is a large dissected caldera complex in the Chilcotin Group and Anahim Volcanic Belt in central British Columbia, Canada. It has a diameter of 60 km (37 mi) and is composed mainly of Eocene felsic and mafic volcanic rocks. Rocks within the caldera range in composition from basalt to rhyolite.

== See also ==
- Volcanism of Canada
- Volcanism of Western Canada
- List of volcanoes in Canada
