= K252 pipe =

Diatreme in Canada

K252 pipe is a diamondiferous diatreme in the Buffalo Head Hills kimberlite field of Northern Alberta, Canada. It is thought to have formed about 85 million years ago when this part of Alberta was volcanically active during the Late Cretaceous period. It contains pyroclastic textures and is intruded into Cenomanian and Albian aged strata.

== See also ==
- List of volcanoes in Canada
- Volcanism of Western Canada
