= Scatarie Bank =

Coordinates: 45°59′N 59°15′W

Scatarie Bank is a bank on the continental shelf off the northeast coast of Nova Scotia, Canada. It represents the remains of a volcanic centre that was constructed along a fracture zone during the Cretaceous period.
