= K19 pipe =

Diatreme in Canada

K19 pipe is a diatreme in the southwestern part of the Buffalo Head Hills kimberlite field in Northern Alberta, Canada. It is thought to have formed about 60 million years ago, making it one of the youngest volcanic features in the Buffalo Head Hills kimberlite field and in Alberta. Unlike many other diatremes in the Buffalo Head Hills kimberlite field, it contains low diamond content.

== See also ==
- List of volcanoes in Canada
- Volcanism of Western Canada
