= Baldface Mountain volcanic field =

Volcanic field in British Columbia, Canada

- Location within British Columbia

Highest point
- Peak: Baldface Mountain
- Elevation: 1,798 m (5,899 ft)
- Coordinates: 52°45′35″N 124°31′53″W

Geography
- Location: British Columbia, Canada

Geology
- Volcanic belt: Anahim Volcanic Belt

The Baldface Mountain volcanic field is a volcanic field in the Central Interior of British Columbia, Canada. It is located about 25 km (16 mi) east of the Itcha Range on the Chilcotin Plateau. The volcanic field contains at least eight volcanic cones and is one of two volcanic fields in the Anahim Volcanic Belt, the other being the Satah Mountain volcanic field which extends south from the Itcha Range.

== Volcanic features ==
All features listed in this table were derived from Kuehn et al. (2015).

Name	Landform	Rock type	Age (Ma)	Coordinates
-	Cinder cone	-	-	52°44′N 124°33.8′W
-	Cinder cone	Trachybasalt	2.43	52°43.2′N 124°33.2′W
-	Eroded cone	Basanite	1.37	52°44.2′N 124°29′W
-	Eroded cone	Basalt	-	52°42.4′N 124°29.5′W
-	Eroded cone	Hawaiite	0.91	52°43.5′N 124°29.2′W
Baldface Mountain	Polygenetic cone	Trachyte, phonolite	2.52–2.37	52°32′3″N 124°45′1″W
-	Cinder cone	Trachybasalt	2.22	52°38.5′N 124°26.6′W
Whitetop Mountain	Eroded cone?	-	-	52°38.9′N 124°33.4′W

== See also ==
- List of volcanoes in Canada
- List of volcanic fields
- Geology of British Columbia
- Anahim hotspot
