= Anahim hotspot =

Hypothetical Geologic Hotspot

- Anahim hotspot (British Columbia) Location of the Anahim hotspot in British Columbia
- Country: Canada
- Province: British Columbia
- Region: Interior Plateau
- Coordinates: 52.93°N 123.73°W—Nazko Cone
- Latest activity: Carbon dioxide emissions
- Last eruption: 7,200 years ago

The Anahim hotspot is a hypothesized hotspot in the Central Interior of British Columbia, Canada. It has been proposed as the candidate source for volcanism in the Anahim Volcanic Belt, a 300-kilometre-long (190 mi) chain of volcanoes and other magmatic features that have undergone erosion. This chain extends from the community of Bella Bella in the west to near the small city of Quesnel in the east. While most volcanoes are created by geological activity at tectonic-plate boundaries, the Anahim hotspot is located hundreds of kilometres away from the nearest plate boundary.

The hotspot was first proposed in the 1970s by three scientists who used John Tuzo Wilson's classic hotspot theory. This theory proposes that a single, fixed mantle plume builds volcanoes that then, cut off from their sources by the movement of the North American Plate, become increasingly inactive and eventually erode over millions of years. A more recent theory, published in 2001 by the Geological Society of America, suggests that the Anahim hotspot might be supplied by a mantle plume from the upper mantle rather than a deep-seated plume as proposed by Wilson. Tomographic imaging has since identified a low-velocity anomaly, indicative of an upwelling plume, that measures roughly 400 kilometres (250 miles) deep. This measurement, however, could be an underestimate as the anomaly might originate deeper inside Earth.

Volcanism as early as 14.5 million years ago has been linked to the Anahim hotspot, with the latest eruption having taken place in the last 8,000 years. This volcanic activity has produced rocks that show a bimodal distribution in composition. While these rocks were being deposited, the hotspot coincided with periods of crustal extension and uplift. Activity in modern times has been limited to earthquakes and volcanic gas emissions.

== Theories ==
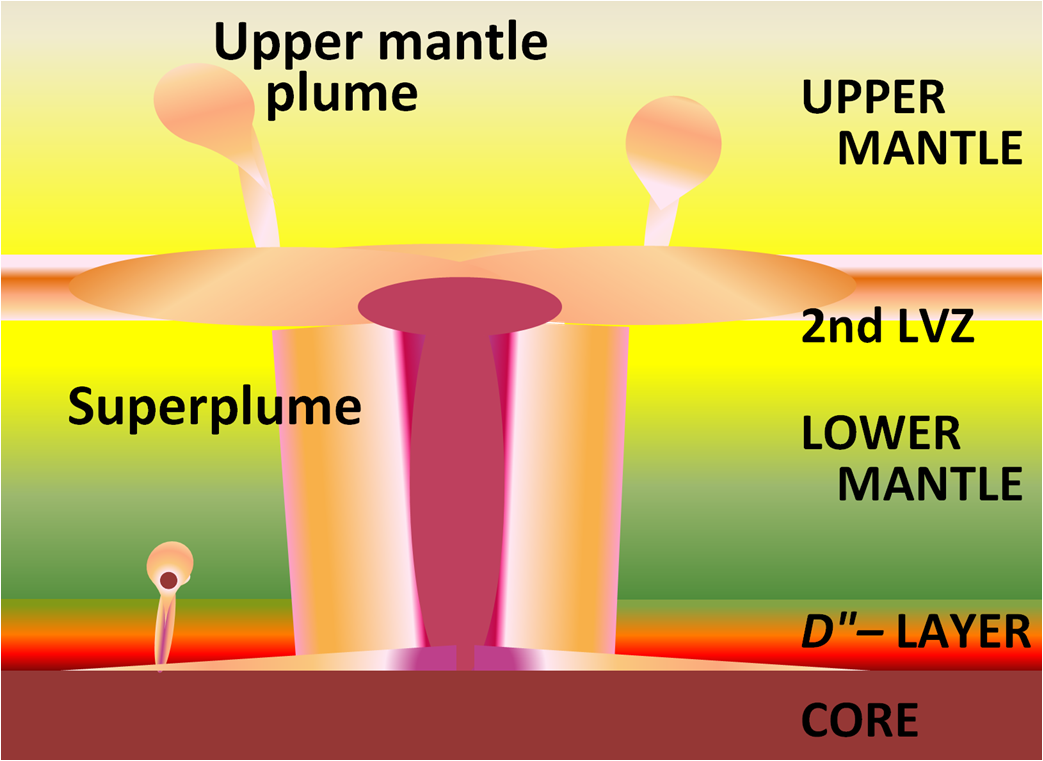
Sketch showing the multi-scale nature of mantle plumes, which involves the creation of the lower-mantle superplume from the D layer and generation of the upper-mantle plumes from the low-viscosity layer below 670 kilometres (420 miles).

Tectonic plates generally focus deformation and volcanism at plate boundaries. However, the Anahim hotspot is about 500 kilometres (310 miles) from the nearest plate boundary. While studying the Anahim Volcanic Belt in 1979, Canadian geologists Mary Bevier, Richard Armstrong and Jack Souther used the hotspot theory to explain this zone of volcanism so far from regular conditions. The theory was first invented by Canadian geophysicist John Tuzo Wilson in 1963 to explain the formation of the Hawaiian Islands.

=== Wilson's stationary hotspot theory ===
In 1963, Wilson proposed that small, long-lasting, exceptionally hot areas of magma exist under Earth's surface; these heat centres create thermally active mantle plumes, which in turn sustain long-lasting volcanic activity. This intraplate volcanism builds peaks that rise above the surrounding landscape. Plate tectonics cause the local tectonic plate (in the case of the Anahim hotspot, the North American Plate) to slowly slide over the hotspot, carrying its volcanoes with it without affecting the plume. Over hundreds of thousands of years, the magma supply for the volcano is slowly cut off, eventually going extinct. No longer active enough to overpower erosion, the volcano slowly erodes away. As the cycle continues, a new volcanic centre manifests and a volcanic peak arises anew. The process continues until the mantle plume itself collapses.

This cycle of growth and dormancy strings together volcanoes over millions of years, leaving a trail of volcanic mountains and intrusions extending from coastal British Columbia across the Coast Mountains into the Interior Plateau. According to Wilson's theory, the Anahim volcanoes should be progressively older and increasingly eroded the further they are from the hotspot and this is easily observable; the oldest rock on coastal British Columbia, that of the Gale Passage dike swarm, is about 14.5 million years old and deeply eroded, whereas the rock at Nazko Cone, the hotspot's present centre, is a comparatively young 0.34 million years of age or less. Radiocarbon dating of peat directly above and below a tephra layer extending 4 kilometres (2.5 miles) from Nazko Cone suggest that the latest eruption occurred approximately 7,200 years ago.

Path of the Anahim hotspot over the last 14.5 million years

Geophysicists believe that hotspots originate at one or two major boundaries deep in the Earth, either a shallow interface in the lower mantle between an upper convecting layer and a lower non-convecting layer, or a deeper D″ ("D double-prime") layer, approximately 200 kilometres (120 miles) thick and immediately above the core-mantle boundary. A mantle plume would initiate at the interface when the warmer lower layer heats a portion of the cooler upper layer. This heated, buoyant and less-viscous portion of the upper layer would become less dense due to thermal expansion and rise towards the surface as a Rayleigh-Taylor instability. When the mantle plume reaches the base of the lithosphere, the plume heats it and produces melt. This magma then makes its way to the surface, where it is erupted as lava.

Arguments for the validity of the hotspot theory generally centre on the steady age progression of Anahim volcanoes and nearby features: a similar eastward-younging spatiotemporal trend exists for the Yellowstone hotspot track 1,400 kilometres (870 miles) to the southeast. The presence of two hotspot tracks on the same continent and their general agreement between each other provides a unique tool in assessing and testing the motion of North America.

=== Shallow hotspot theory ===
Another hypothesis is that the Anahim hotspot is supplied by a miniplume. These mantle plumes have their roots in the upper mantle but they may later originate from the lower mantle. Arguments for an Anahim miniplume are centred on the existence of two small dike swarms at the western (hence oldest) end of the Anahim Volcanic Belt. This assumption is in turn based on the notion that giant dike swarms mark the arrival of deep-seated mantle plumes.

== History of study ==
In 1977, Jack Souther produced a synthesis of volcanism in the Canadian Cordillera and delineated several Neogene-to-Quaternary volcanic belts throughout British Columbia. One of these was the linear Anahim Volcanic Belt, which included the Wells Gray-Clearwater volcanic field at its eastern end. However, its origin had not yet been understood. In 1979, two volcano tectonic models had been proposed by Jack Souther, Mary Bevier and Richard Armstrong. This included a hotspot and a propagating crack controlled by stress fields related to large-scale plate tectonics of western North America.

Cutaway diagram of Earth's internal structure

In 1981, Garry C. Rogers of the Geological Survey of Canada speculated that earthquake swarms at McNaughton Lake (now called Kinbasket Lake) may be related to the Anahim hotspot. Rogers noted that if the seismicity is related to a hotspot, the surface expression must be lagging 100 kilometres (62 miles) behind the passage of the hotspot. An alternative theory proposed by Rogers is that if the Anahim hotspot is located under the Wells Gray-Clearwater area, the stress field surrounding the hotspot must precede it by approximately 100 kilometres (62 miles).

In 1987, Canadian volcanologist Catherine Hickson revealed that the Wells Gray-Clearwater volcanic field is not part of the Anahim Volcanic Belt, but rather a separate centre that most likely represents an area of lithospheric decompression melting caused by rifting along pre-existing crustal fractures. The Wells Gray-Clearwater volcanic field has since not been considered part of the Anahim Volcanic Belt and the Anahim hotspot is now believed to be in the area of Nazko Cone.

The existence of an Anahim hotspot was supported in a detailed Bulletin of Volcanology report by Kuehn et al. (2015). This included new geochemical and geochronometric data for the Baldface Mountain and Satah Mountain volcanic fields, as well as for Nazko Cone. The obtained data indicated that volcanism in the two fields were contemporaneous with the adjacent Itcha Range shield volcano and that both volcanic fields agree with the vector of the North American Plate motion over a hotspot in the British Columbia Interior. It was also noted that the trace and rare-earth element patterns of mafic lavas in the Anahim Volcanic Belt are similar to ocean island basalts, providing more evidence for a hotspot.

== Characteristics ==
=== Position ===
High-resolution local tomography indicates a possible lower-mantle plume and a pond of plume material is evidenced by a large low-velocity zone in the upper mantle. These low-seismic-velocity zones often indicate hotter and more buoyant mantle material. The low-velocity zone is flanked on both sides by high-velocity anomalies of variable amplitude. In the north, high velocities may reflect the remains of batholithic roots that formed as a result of continuous subduction along the northern continental margin 150 to 50 million years ago. High velocities in the south represent the subducting Juan de Fuca slab. Centered near Nazko Cone, the low-velocity zone extends to a depth of approximately 400 kilometres (250 miles). However, it may extend deeper southward beneath the Juan de Fuca slab through the transition zone into the lower mantle. This has led to the conclusion that the Anahim hotspot is supplied by a mantle plume over slab edge flow. Isotopic studies of lead and strontium in Anahim lavas indicate the presence of suboceanic mantle under central British Columbia, which in turn corroborates the lack of a subducting slab under the Anahim Volcanic Belt since the Miocene.

=== Movement ===
Individual volcanoes drift southwest from the hotspot at a rate of about 2–3 centimetres (0.79–1.18 inches) per year, with each successive volcanic centre spending about two million years actively attached to the plume. The oldest Anahim volcano, situated on the Central Coast of British Columbia, formed 14.5 million years ago. If any prior record in the form of seamounts existed off the British Columbia Coast, this record would presumably have been subducted under North America with the Farallon/Juan de Fuca plates and lost. Therefore, it remains unknown if the hotspot existed in the Pacific Ocean prior to being located on the North American continent from ongoing plate motion. However, past geologic field mapping and geochemical studies suggest massive plutons could be present in the offshore continental shelf. These suspected bodies are aligned with the northeast-trending Anahim Volcanic Belt, whose age progression suggests these suspected offshore plutons could be of Miocene age. An earlier displaced portion of the hotspot track might exist on Haida Gwaii as part of the Masset Formation. However, further analyses of Masset volcanic rocks are still required to determine if they are compositionally and istopically similar to alkalic lavas found on the mainland.

=== Magma ===
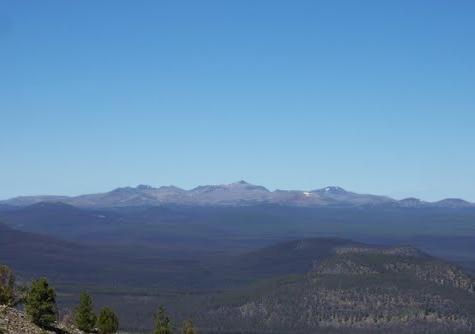
The Itcha Range as seen from the south with a forested volcanic cone in the foreground

The composition of the volcanoes' magma has changed significantly with time as they grow over the hotspot and migrate away. Volcanic activity 14.5 to 3.0 million years ago was predominately felsic, producing large volumes of rhyolite and trachyte lava. This can be explained by the presence of thick granitic structures under these volcanoes, which have been tectonically compressed from being near the North American Plate margin. A unique characteristic of the felsic lava flows is that, although they were high in silica content, the flows were overly fluid in nature. This is because the peralkaline content of these felsic lavas decreased the viscosity of the flows a minimum of 10–30 times over that of calc-alkaline felsic flows. Evidence for explosive volcanism exists in the form of pumice flows, bedded tuffs, intensely shattered basement rocks and the high content of coarse basement clasts in rhyolite breccias.

Magma production of the Anahim hotspot has shifted from more felsic to more mafic compositions in the last 3.0 million years. For instance, much of the magma created between 3.0 and 0.33 million years ago was igneous phonolite, trachyte, trachyandesite, basalt and basanite; the volcanoes built during this period are almost entirely made of these rock types. Other igneous rocks such as phonotephrite are present in smaller quantities; these occur in the Satah Mountain volcanic field. Volcanic eruptions in the last 0.33 million years have been mainly basanitic and have occurred at the youngest eruptive centre, Nazko Cone. Basanites produced by these eruptions are significantly more undersaturated than basalts from older Anahim volcanoes in the west and may indicate an eastward shift toward a deeper or less-depleted mantle source. The overall chemistry and mineralogy of the Anahim magmas are analogous to regions of incipient continental rifting above a mantle plume.

== Volcanoes ==
Over the last 14.5 million years, the Anahim hotspot has created at least 40 volcanoes. These centres comprise the Anahim Volcanic Belt, one of the six Neogene–Quaternary volcanic provinces in British Columbia. The Anahim Volcanic Belt can be organized into three groupings: the western section, which has been reduced to remnants of eruptive breccia, high-level plutons and dike swarms; the central section, which consists of predominantly shield volcanoes; and the eastern section, which comprises several small cinder cones and is the location of all modern volcanic activity.

=== Volcanic characteristics ===
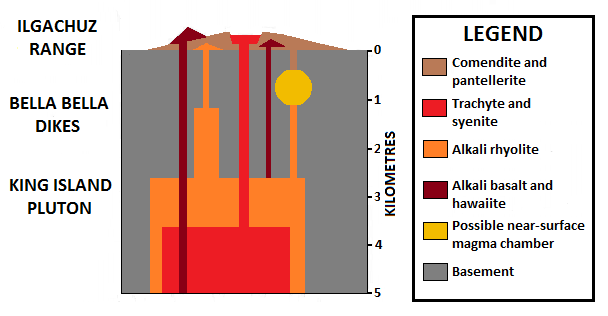
Depth relationships and compositional correlation of plutonic, hypabyssal and volcanic rocks exposed in the western Anahim Belt

The Anahim volcanoes are grouped into three types: volcanic cones, shield volcanoes and lava domes. The shields are characterized by their large size (hundreds of kilometres in volume) and their symmetrical shape. They are the most prominent of the three volcano types, with the Rainbow Range being the highest at around 2,500 metres (8,200 feet) above sea level. Their outer slopes merge with older flat-lying basalt flows of the Chilcotin Group, which covers a large percentage of the Interior Plateau. The more abundant lava domes and volcanic cones are much smaller in size (less than 1 km^{3} in volume). These comprise two extensive volcanic fields in the vicinity of the Itcha Range.

Although many Anahim volcanoes are surrounded by Chilcotin Group basalt flows, the exact nature of their relationship is unknown. It is unlikely that the Anahim volcanoes ever were a source area for the Chilcotin basalts, as they have distinct transitional geochemistries. The Chilcotin Group is interpreted to be related to back-arc extension behind the Cascadia subduction zone.

=== Evolution and construction ===
Each volcano type produced by the Anahim hotspot has its own unique life cycle of growth and erosion. Volcanic cones have their origins from tephra accumulating around vents during Strombolian eruptions. They are composed of trachyte, trachyandesite, basalt, phonolite, basanite and, to a lesser extent, phonotephrite. In contrast, lava domes are formed mainly by viscous trachytic magma that erupts effusively onto the surface and then piles up thick around vents. Considering the generally small dimensions of these two volcano types, they are likely the products of episodic and short-lived activity. Larger structures such as Satah Mountain, Baldface Mountain and Mount Punkutlaenkut are exceptions. Once activity has ended, erosion eventually reduces the cones and domes into volcanic remnants such as lava plugs.

Shield volcanoes undergo at least two stages of volcanic activity. The initial shield stage is the most productive volcanically and features repeated eruptions of large volumes of predominately fluid peralkaline felsic magmas that become progressively more evolved. During this stage, a small summit caldera may form, as is the case for the Ilgachuz Range. After the shield stage has been completed, the post-shield stage succeeds. This stage of activity is characterized by small volumes of mafic lavas expressed as small cinder cones and capping flows. Dissection of the shield by stream erosion is also apparent, resulting in the creation of deeply incised radial valleys.

Prolonged erosion eventually removes most if not all traces of the volcanoes to expose their underlying solidified magma systems. Such systems can be 1 to 4 kilometres (0.62 to 2.49 miles) below the surface, with rocks ranging from hypabyssal to plutonic. Exposure of the King Island Pluton and the Bella Bella and Gale Passage dike swarms are prime examples of this phase of erosion.

== Tectonic history ==
=== Extensional tectonics ===
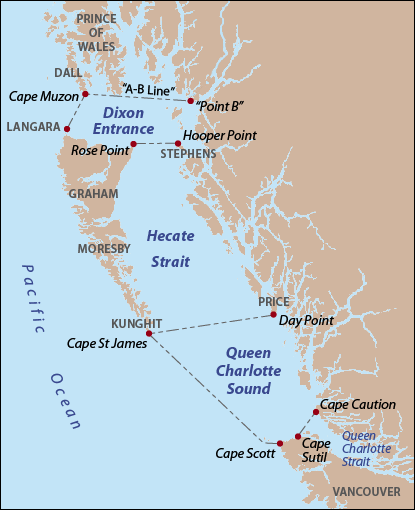
Queen Charlotte Sound as delineated by BC Geographical Names, along with Hecate Strait and Dixon Entrance.

Rifting and crustal extension in Queen Charlotte Sound up to about 17 million years ago has been linked to the Early Miocene passage of the Anahim hotspot. Yorath and Chase (1981) proposed that subcrustal melting above the Anahim plume resulted in weakening of the regional crust, setting the stage for rift development. Later, widespread volcanism produced subaerial basalt and rhyolite flows in the region of the rift and along transcurrent faults that extend towards the northwest. Haida Gwaii was displaced approximately 70 kilometres (43 miles) to the north along a series of faults extending through Sandspit and Louscoone Islet. This period of rifting and crustal extension contributed to the formation of the Queen Charlotte Basin.

While the rift was in development, a conservative plate boundary would have extended northwards from the landward end of the rift. Such a plate boundary might have been similar to the Gulf of California – San Andreas fault system in the U.S. state of California. This type of configuration need have existed for only a few million years to generate the 70 kilometres (43 miles) of opening in the rift. Alternatively, the Haida Gwaii block may have been only partially coupled to the offshore plate during a longer period of oblique convergence. Bathyal sediments, perhaps as young as 15 million years, were deposited within the rift zone during and after the rifting as the Anahim hotspot passed by.

=== Uplift ===
Starting about 10 million years ago, the Anahim hotspot began to pass under the Bella Coola–Ocean Falls region. This coincided with increased regional uplift of the south-central Coast Mountains. After the hotspot reached the Chilcotin Plateau 8 million years ago, uplift had decreased. This suggests that the uplift could have been thermally driven by the Anahim hotspot, which thinned the lithosphere and caused changes in sub-crustal and surface heat flux. About 1 kilometre (0.62 miles) of uplift was achieved during the hotspot's time in the south-central Coast Mountains over a period of a few million years.

=== Hotspot–fault interactions ===
The Anahim hotspot was stationed in a tectonically complex region of the Chilcotin Plateau between 3.9 and 1.4 million years ago. This complexity may have given rise to interactions of the hotspot with pre-existing fracture systems, such that magma rose along normal faults to create a 50-kilometre-long (31-mile) north–south-trending chain of volcanoes. The Itcha Range developed directly over the intersection, whereas the Satah Mountain volcanic field developed along the more distal portions of the fracture system and away from the Itcha Range. A lack of extensive volcanic fields adjacent to the neighbouring Ilgachuz and Rainbow ranges might indicate an absence of fracture systems associated with those volcanoes.

== Historical activity ==
Volcanic eruptions are not known to have occurred from the Anahim hotspot in historical times. However, since 2007, there have been recorded volcano tectonic earthquakes and carbon dioxide emissions in the vicinity of Nazko Cone. The lack of evidence for historic seismicity prior to 2007 suggests that the area is tectonically stable, making the Nechako Basin one of the most seismically inactive areas of British Columbia.

=== Seismicity ===
From October 9, 2007, to May 15, 2008, a series of earthquakes measuring up to 2.9 magnitude occurred in the Nechako Basin some 20 kilometres (12 miles) west of Nazko Cone. Most of them occurred 25 to 31 kilometres (16 to 19 miles) below the surface, indicating that they originated within the lowermost crust. Analysis of seismic waves suggest that the earthquake swarm was caused by brittle failure and fracturing of rock at depth from magma intrusion. No volcanic eruption was likely, as the number and size of the tremors were too small. Nevertheless, these earthquakes suggest that the Anahim hotspot is seismically active and that small magma movements are still possible. Although these earthquakes were too small to be felt, they generated substantial local interest, as they represented a significant concentration of seismic activity within the Anahim Volcanic Belt.

=== Carbon dioxide emissions ===
Vigorous degassing of carbon dioxide occurs from several vents in two bogs near Nazko Cone. These vents are in the form of small, isolated travertine mounds on the bog surface. A mound with a partially submerged vent had been identified in 2013 with a steady flow of carbon dioxide. Several new vents with no travertine mound were actively releasing carbon dioxide gas in 2015. Analysis of the carbon-13 isotope in the carbon dioxide gas emissions suggest a magmatic origin. This has led to the possibility of a volcanic geothermal system, the existence of which has been investigated by Geoscience BC as part of their Targeting Resources for Exploration and Knowledge project. The lack of hot springs and geothermal evidence on the surface suggest that the heat source of such a system would be very deep underground.

== Volcanic hazards ==
The Anahim hotspot is set in a remote location accessed by a network of logging roads from Quesnel on Highway 97. Because of this, the most immediate hazard relating to future eruptions is of local concern only. Although not heavily populated, the area is home to forestry operations and the small community of Nazko. The presence of burned wood within Nazko tephra suggests that this area is prone to forest fires caused by volcanic eruptions. Also, if an eruption column were to be produced, it would disrupt local air traffic: volcanic ash reduces visibility and can cause jet engine failure, as well as damage to other aircraft systems. Renewed volcanism is likely to result in the creation of mafic cinder cones, with the latest such event having occurred with the eruption of Nazko Cone 7,200 years ago. However, eruptions of less mafic magma, typical of earlier activity of the Anahim hotspot, cannot be ruled out.

== See also ==
- List of volcanic hotspots
- List of volcanoes in Canada
- Volcanism of Western Canada
