= 2007–2008 Nazko earthquakes =

Series of earthquakes in Canada

- Location in British Columbia
- Local date: Started: October 9, 2007 Ended: June 12, 2008
- Magnitude: <4.0 M_{L}
- Depth: approx. 25 km (16 mi)
- Epicenter: 52.88°N 124.08°W
- Areas affected: Canada
- Max. intensity: MMI I (Not felt)
- Casualties: None

A series of small volcanic earthquakes measuring less than 4.0 on the Richter magnitude scale took place in the sparsely populated Nazko area of the Central Interior of British Columbia, Canada, from October 9, 2007, to June 12, 2008. They occurred just west of Nazko Cone, a small tree-covered cinder cone that last erupted about 7,200 years ago.

No damage or casualties resulted from the Nazko earthquakes, which were too small to be felt by people, but local seismographs recorded them. The earthquake swarm occurred at the eastern end of a known volcanic zone called the Anahim Volcanic Belt. This is an east–west trending line of volcanic formations extending from the Central Coast to the Central Interior of British Columbia.

== Geology ==
The 2007–2008 Nazko earthquake swarm is interpreted to have originated 25 kilometres (16 miles) below the surface. The character of the seismic waves indicated the swarm originated from a magmatic source. It could have resulted from rock fracturing at the tip of a dike and/or by movement along fault planes due to changes in the local stress field by the expansion and movement of magma. This magmatic activity is potentially linked to the Anahim hotspot, a mantle plume that is responsible for older volcanism throughout the Anahim Volcanic Belt. The volcanoes in this volcanic zone generally become older to the west, indicating the North American Plate is moving in a westerly direction with respect to the hotspot, carrying the volcanoes along with it at a rate of about 2.5 centimetres (0.98 inches) per year. The 2007–2008 Nazko earthquakes occurred at the eastern end of the Anahim Volcanic Belt where the youngest volcanic activity has occurred.

The extent of the Anahim Volcanic Belt

No earthquakes had been recorded in the Nazko region until October 9, 2007, when the swarm began. Most of the earthquakes reached magnitudes of less than 2.5 on the Richter magnitude scale, but at least one earthquake was as strong as magnitude 3.9. The lack of recorded earthquakes in the Nazko region prior to 2007 is due to the Central Interior of British Columbia being one of the most seismically inactive areas of the province; few earthquakes have been detected or located near the Nechako Basin. As of 2024, the 2007–2008 Nazko earthquakes are the most recent significant seismic event to have occurred in volcanic regions throughout Canada.

During the earthquake swarm in 2007, a group of scientists investigated the possibility that a volcanic eruption would occur. Five additional seismographs were placed in the earthquake zone, and scientists closely monitored the seismic activity. After additional data were gathered, scientists with the United States Geological Survey, the University of Washington and other organizations agreed that the Nazko earthquakes probably originated from movement of magma beneath the surface near Nazko Cone. However, because of the number and small sizes of the Nazko earthquakes, no volcanic eruption was likely. Other earthquakes in North America that have been attributed to magma but did not result in a volcanic eruption include the 2003 earthquakes under Lake Tahoe in the U.S. state of California and a 2004 earthquake swarm at Jordan Craters in the U.S. state of Oregon.

== Number of earthquakes ==
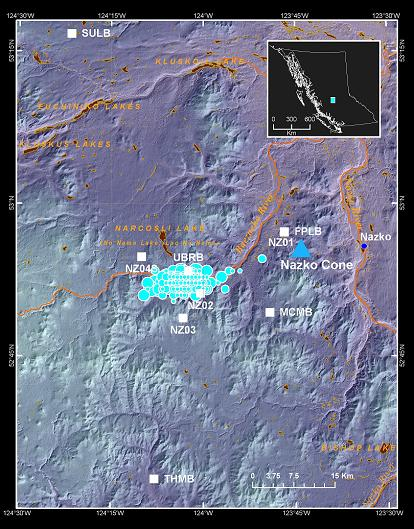
Overlapped cyan circles indicate the locations of earthquakes that were associated with the Nazko swarm.

More than 1,000 earthquakes were recorded by regional seismic networks within three weeks of October 20, 2007. Because the seismometers that recorded the Nazko swarm were more than 25 km (16 mi) away from where the earthquakes took place, the locations of the hypocenters were measured with poor resolution. Following the earthquake, five seismometers were placed by the Geological Survey of Canada from September 2007 to June 2008 close to the hypocenter. Analysis of the data recorded by these seismometers indicates a much larger total number of earthquakes. For example, at least 597 earthquakes were recorded during a period of only six hours.

At least two episodes of earthquakes constitute the Nazko swarm. In the first seismic phase from October 9 to November 1, 2007, a total of 153 earthquakes took place. During the second seismic phase between September 25, 2007 and June 12, 2008, 4,428 earthquakes occurred. These two seismic episodes were cross-correlated by scientists to understand changes in the development of the earthquake swarm. Correlation coefficients were around 1.0 for the beginnings of the periods of activity, indicating almost identical situations, and then decayed to around 0.5, indicating a decrease in similarity between the later stages of the two events.

== Scientific response ==
The earthquake swarm was noted on October 12, 2007 in the Prince George Citizen by citizen staff, three days after the earthquakes began. Scientists mentioned in the report were seismologist John Cassidy of Natural Resources Canada and volcanologist Catherine Hickson, who was part of the Geological Survey of Canada at the time. At the time of the report, scientists did not know the origin of the swarm. Seismologist John Cassidy stated, "the depth is enough to rule out hydrothermal but it's up in the air as to whether the cause is tectonic shifts or volcanic activity. If it is volcanic there are certain characteristics that we would expect, there's a tremor-like character to it. And so we'll be looking for the types of events that we see beneath volcanoes and we'll be looking to see if they're getting closer to the surface or if they're migrating at all."

Even if the Nazko swarm were a warning of a volcanic eruption, Hickson doubted it would turn out to be a highly explosive eruption like those that can occur in subduction-zone volcanoes. "We're not talking about an injection of tonnes of ash many kilometers into the air like the 1980 Mount St. Helens eruption or the 1991 Mount Pinatubo eruption. We're talking about something very small, relatively localized that should have a fairly limited impact... but it'll be extremely exciting", Hickson said. If an eruption were to occur, Hickson suggested that it would be characterized by a lava fountain that sends globs of lava 100 m (330 ft) into the air. This is similar to those that occur in Hawaii. Hickson said that a Nazko eruption could be a tourist attraction, but warned that noxious gases such as carbon dioxide and sulfur dioxide would be released during the event.

== Preparedness and hazards ==
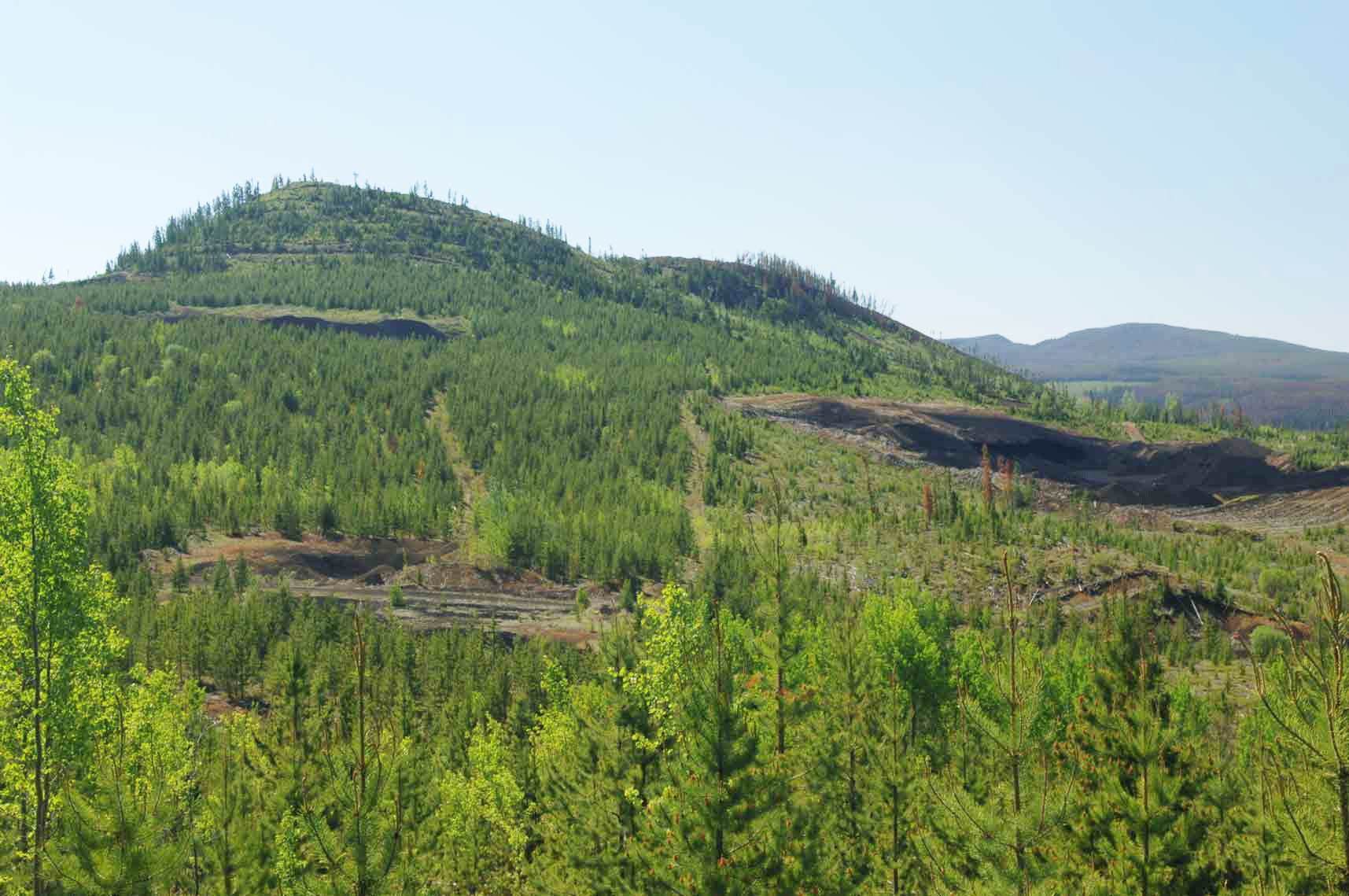
Nazko Cone, the volcano that was adjacent to the 2007–2008 Nazko earthquakes.

Because no seismographs were close enough to the Nazko swarm zone before the earthquakes began, employees of Natural Resources Canada placed seismographs in the area to monitor future earthquakes in the area more clearly. An infrasound station is also being established, which is able to measure sound waves that would normally go unnoticed by human hearing. These stations can detect volcanic eruptions and the release of gas at volcanic vents, and can be used in combination with other geophysical data to monitor fluid flow within volcanoes.

Employees of Natural Resources Canada had also visited two communities that were adjacent to the 2007–2008 earthquake swarm to renew information about the Nazko swarm, collect samples, and examine some of the more poorly studied volcanic deposits in the Nazko region. The Natural Resources Canada employees also measured carbon dioxide levels during the earthquake swarm; carbon dioxide is usually discharged at faults in volcanically active areas and can collect in soil and under snow. Because of this, carbon dioxide concentrations can provide information on volcanic activity in the subsurface. The Nazko swarm did not cause any discernible discharge of carbon dioxide, which is normal for non-eruptive events.

If magma were to rise towards the surface of Nazko, new earthquake swarms would occur, with a significant increase in the size and number of earthquakes. An eruption in the Nazko area would probably create a small cinder cone, similar to what formed Nazko Cone 7,200 years ago. Immediate hazards related to cinder cone eruptions in the Nazko area would probably be forest fires and, if an eruption column were produced, redirection of nearby air traffic.

== See also ==
- List of earthquakes in 2007
- List of earthquakes in 2008
- List of earthquakes in Canada
- Volcanism of Canada
- Volcanism of Western Canada
