= Calcareous =

Adjective meaning mostly or partly composed of calcium carbonate

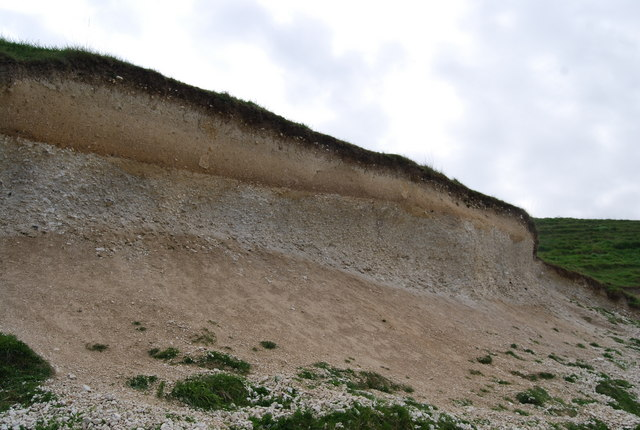
Calcareous sandstone in Seven Sisters Country Park, England

Calcareous (/kælˈkɛəriəs/) is an adjective meaning "mostly or partly composed of calcium carbonate", in other words, containing lime or being chalky. The term is used in a wide variety of scientific disciplines.

== In zoology ==
Calcareous is used as an adjectival term applied to anatomical structures which are made primarily of calcium carbonate, in animals such as gastropods, i.e., snails, specifically in relation to such structures as the operculum, the clausilium, and the love dart. The term also applies to the calcium carbonate tests of, often, more-or-less microscopic Foraminifera. Not all tests are calcareous; diatoms and radiolaria have siliceous tests.

The molluscs are calcareous organisms, as are the calcareous sponges (Calcarea), that have spicules which are made of calcium carbonate.

Additionally, reef-building corals, or Scleractinia, are calcareous organisms that form their rigid skeletal structure through the precipitation of aragonite (i.e., a polymorph of calcium carbonate).

== In botany ==
Calcareous grassland is a form of grassland characteristic of soils containing much calcium carbonate from underlying chalk or limestone rock.

== In medicine ==
The term is used in pathology, for example in calcareous conjunctivitis, and when referring to calcareous metastasis or calcareous deposits, which may both be removed surgically.

== In geology ==
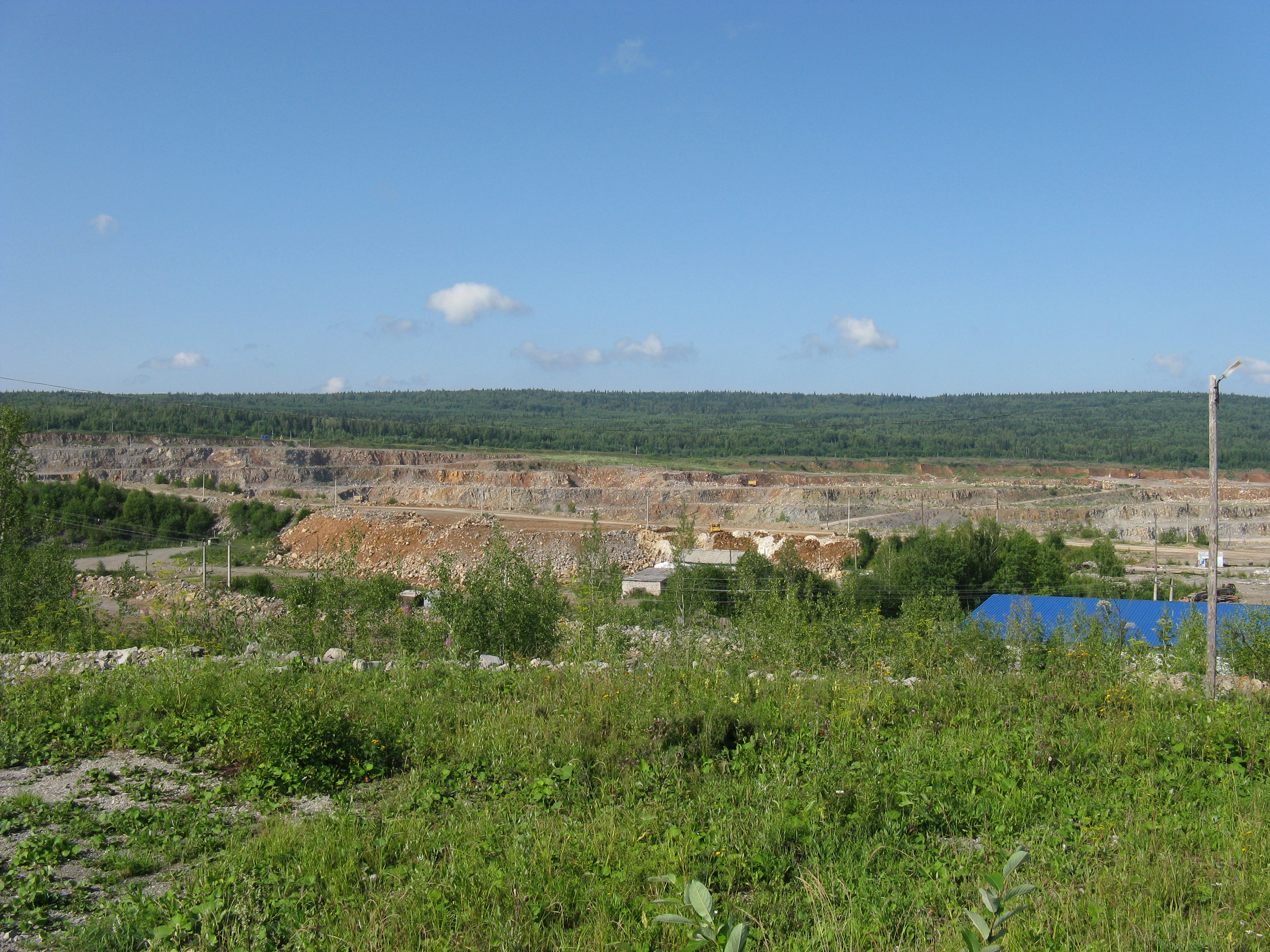
Calcareous mine in Perm Krai, Russia

The term calcareous can be applied to a sediment, sedimentary rock, or soil type, which is formed from or contains a high proportion of calcium carbonate, in the form of calcite or aragonite.

=== Marine sediments ===
Calcareous sediments are typically deposited in shallow water closer to land, as marine organisms that precipitate calcium carbonate primarily reside within shallow water ecosystems, due to an inability to precipitate calcium carbonate at depth (see carbonate compensation depth). Generally speaking, the farther from land sediments that they fall, the less calcareous they are, and deviations from this expectation arise if: (a) the ocean floor is shallower than the CCD or (b) storms/ocean currents transport calcareous sediments away from their origin point, leading to the interbedding of calcareous sediments in alternative locations.

An additional form of calcareous marine sediment consists of calcareous ooze, which is a form of calcium carbonate sediment that consists of >30% biogenous material, predominantly consisting of organisms such as coccolithophores and foraminifera. These oozes form slowly under low-energy environments, and necessitate higher seawater saturation states or a deeper CCD (see supersaturation and precipitation vs. undersaturation and dissolution). Therefore, in shallow CCD conditions (i.e., undersaturation of calcium carbonate at depth), stable, non-calcareous sediments, such as siliceous ooze or pelagic red clay, will prevail in marine sediment records.

=== Calcareous soils ===
Calcareous soils are relatively alkaline. In other words, they have a high pH. They are characterized by the presence of calcium carbonate in the parent material; the carbonate-ion is a base. Additionally, these soils may have a calcic horizon, a layer of secondary accumulation of carbonates (usually calciumcarbonate or magnesiumcarbonate) in excess of 15% calcium carbonate equivalent and at least 5% more carbonate than an underlying layer.

=== List of calcareous rivers ===
- Ganga

== Man made deposits ==
Calcareous deposits can form in water pipes. An example of this is Sunday stone.

== In electrochemistry ==
Calcareous coatings, or calcareous deposits, are mixtures of calcium carbonate and magnesium hydroxide that are deposited on cathodically protected surfaces because of the increased pH adjacent to the surface.
