= Satah Mountain volcanic field =

Volcanic field in British Columbia, Canada

- Location within British Columbia

Highest point
- Peak: Satah Mountain
- Elevation: 1,921 m (6,302 ft)
- Coordinates: 52°28′32.9″N 124°41′22.9″W

Geography
- Location: British Columbia, Canada

Geology
- Volcanic belt: Anahim Volcanic Belt

The Satah Mountain volcanic field (SMVF) is an extensive north-south trending volcanic chain in the Central Interior of British Columbia that stretches south of the Itcha Range shield volcano to northeast of Nimpo Lake. The chain is located on the Chilcotin Plateau, a major subdivision of the Interior Plateau that includes other nearby volcanic features. It forms a segment of the east-west trending Anahim Volcanic Belt, whose volcanic activity ranges in age from Miocene-to-Holocene.

This volcanic chain is named after its highest volcano, Satah Mountain, 35 km (22 mi) northeast of Nimpo Lake.

== Geology ==
Volcanic features in the Satah Mountain field include lava domes, cinder cones and lava flows. Lava domes and flows are composed of trachyte and the cinder cones consist of basaltic and trachybasaltic lava. The most recently formed cone is well preserved and might have a similar age to the 7,200‑year‑old Nazko Cone at the easternmost end of the Anahim Volcanic Belt. However, argon-argon dating by Kuehn et al. (2015) found that the youngest SMVF feature was a 1.43 million year old plug of basaltic trachyandesite.

== Volcanic features ==
All features listed in this table were derived from Kuehn et al. (2015) except where noted.

Name	Landform	Rock type	Age (Ma)	Coordinates
-	Erosional remnant	Phonolite	-	52°24.6′N 124°42.5′W
-	Eroded cone	Basaltic trachyandesite	1.94	52°23.8′N 124°45.8′W
-	Eroded cone	Trachyte	-	52°22.5′N 124°34′W
-	Eroded cone	Phonotephrite	-	52°26.4′N 124°37.3′W
-	Eroded cone	Trachyte	1.95	52°31.9′N 124°42.9′W
-	Eroded cone	-	-	52°32.3′N 124°45.1′W
-	Eroded cone	-	-	52°32.5′N 124°46.8′W
-	Eroded cone	Trachyte	1.66	52°32.1′N 124°47.9′W
-	Eroded cone, lava flows	Trachybasalt, trachyandesite, trachyte	1.77	52°23.7′N 124°42′W
-	Cone	Trachyte	-	52°22.5′N 124°44.4′W
-	Plug	Basaltic trachyandesite	1.43	52°20.4′N 124°40′W
Jorgensen Hill	Eroded cone	Trachybasalt	2.21	52°16.6′N 124°29.1′W
-	Eroded dome?	Trachyte	-	52°30.6′N 124°42.1′W
-	Eroded dome?	Trachyte	-	52°26.4′N 124°42.6′W
Mount Punkutlaenkut	Polygenetic cone	Trachyte	1.96	52°29.5′N 124°47.8′W
Satah Mountain	Polygenetic, complex cone	Basaltic trachyandesite, trachyandesite (benmoreite), trachyte	1.83–1.77	52°28.5′N 124°41.4′W
Sugarloaf Mountain	Eroded cone	Trachyte	2.18	52°16.4′N 124°48.2′W
-	Eroded dome	Trachyte	1.74	52°25.7′N 124°42.4′W
Turbo Lake	Lava flow	Trachybasalt	-	52°18.9′N 124°48.2′W
-	Erosional remnant	Phonolite	-	52°29.6′N 124°43.5′W
White Creek	Cone	-	-	52°32′57″N 124°51′7″W
Holte Creek	Cone	-	-	52°28′50″N 124°45′26″W

== See also ==
- List of volcanoes in Canada
- List of volcanic fields
- Geology of British Columbia
- Anahim hotspot
