= Anahim Volcanic Belt =

Chain of volcanoes and related magmatic features in British Columbia, Canada

- Volcanic belt
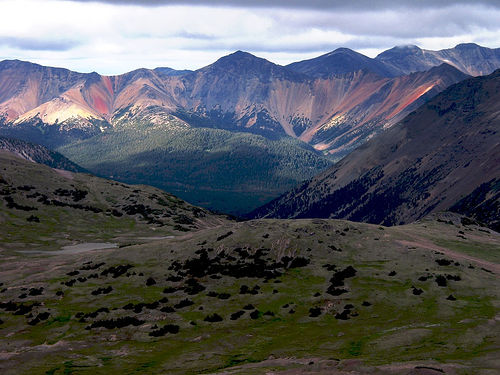
- The Rainbow Range in the central Anahim Volcanic Belt
- Interactive map of Anahim Volcanic Belt
- Coordinates: 52°40′N 125°50′W
- Location: British Columbia, Canada
- Age: Neogene-to-Quaternary

Dimensions
  - Length: 330 km (210 mi)
- Highest elevation: 2,495 m (8,186 ft) (Rainbow Range)
- Last eruption: 7,200 years ago

The Anahim Volcanic Belt (AVB) is a west–east trending chain of volcanoes and related magmatic features in British Columbia, Canada. It extends from Athlone Island on the Central Coast, running eastward through the strongly uplifted and deeply dissected Coast Mountains to near the community of Nazko on the Interior Plateau. The AVB is delineated as three west-to-east segments that differ in age and structure. A wide variety of igneous rocks with differing compositions occur throughout these segments, comprising landforms such as volcanic cones, volcanic plugs, lava domes, shield volcanoes and intrusions.

Volcanic activity has occurred repeatedly in the AVB for the last 15 million years, during which time three major magmatic episodes took place 15–13, 9–6 and 3–1 million years ago. These major magmatic episodes are represented by plutons, dike swarms, volcanic fields and large shield volcanoes. Volcanic activity in the last 1 million years has been relatively minor and localized, having produced small lava flows and cones. The last eruptive period took place at the easternmost end of the volcanic belt 7,200 years ago, with magma-induced earthquakes having occurred as recently as 2007–2008.

== Geology ==
The location and extent of the Anahim Volcanic Belt

The AVB is one of the six volcanic provinces in British Columbia that formed during the Neogene–Quaternary period. It consists mainly of alkaline to peralkaline rocks that range from oversaturated, highly evolved phonolites and rhyolites to more undersaturated lavas. Several AVB centres overlie Miocene flood basalts of the Chilcotin Group, which in turn overlie Devonian to Jurassic rocks of the Stikinia volcanic arc terrane. In some places the AVB lavas imperceptibly merge with the Chilcotin Group basalts as the two volcanic zones were active simultaneously from the Neogene to Quaternary.

This west–east trending volcanic belt is about 330 km (210 mi) long, extending from the Central Coast through the Coast Mountains to near the community of Nazko on the Interior Plateau. Its orientation is unique among the Neogene–Quaternary volcanic provinces of British Columbia in that it is perpendicular to the major geomorphological, structural and tectonic elements of the Canadian Cordillera. Three segments comprise the AVB: the western segment, which has been reduced to remnants of eruptive breccia, high-level plutons and dike swarms; the central segment, which consists of predominantly shield volcanoes; and the eastern segment, which consists of several small cinder cones and is the location of all modern volcanic activity.

Several tectonic models have been proposed to explain the origin of the AVB. These include rifting, a mantle hotspot, a plate-edge effect or slab window leading to magma ascent along the northern edge of the Juan de Fuca Plate, or a propagating crack controlled by stress fields related to large-scale plate tectonics of western North America. The generally preferred tectonic model is a mantle hotspot as the AVB decreases in age from west to east, a trend that is consistent with the westward motion of North America at the rate of about 2.5 cm (0.98 in) per year. There are also observed chemical differences between the oldest (western) and youngest (eastern) basalts. The youngest basalts are undersaturated alkaline lavas and are classified as basanite, suggesting a deeper source zone for magma in the Nazko area compared to the rest of the AVB.

=== Western segment ===
The Bella Bella and Gale Passage dike swarms on the Central Coast of British Columbia form the westernmost extent of the AVB. They are both over 10 km (6.2 mi) wide, with individual dikes measuring up to 20 m (66 ft) thick. Both swarms attain K–Ar ages of 12.5 to 14.5 million years and consist of a bimodal suite of basalt, trachyte and comendite. Basaltic and comenditic dikes are the most abundant, distributed in about equal proportions. Near the centre of each dike swarm are erosional remnants of rhyolite breccia with locally occurring rhyolite flows that comprise the Bella Bella Formation. The breccias contain a high content of coarse basement clasts, indicating that they are the product of explosive volcanism. Rhyolites associated with the Bella Bella dike swarm are distributed on Denny Island whereas rhyolites belonging to the Gale Passage dike swarm are found on the northern ends of Athlone Island and Dufferin Island.

Exposed in 1,000 m (3,300 ft) high cliffs along the Dean and Burke channels is the King Island Pluton. This easterly trending intrusion has a length of over 20 km (12 mi) and a width of 2.5 km (1.6 mi), cutting across the predominantly northwest structural trend of the Coast Plutonic Complex. Two distinct phases of magmatism created the King Island Pluton 10.3 to 13 million years ago. The first and principal phase formed the core of the pluton which comprises coarse-grained syenite. These rocks form most of the pluton exposures at sea level. The second phase resulted in the creation of a marginal zone of alkali granite at the extreme western end of the King Island Pluton, as well as satellite stocks west of the main pluton.

=== Central segment ===
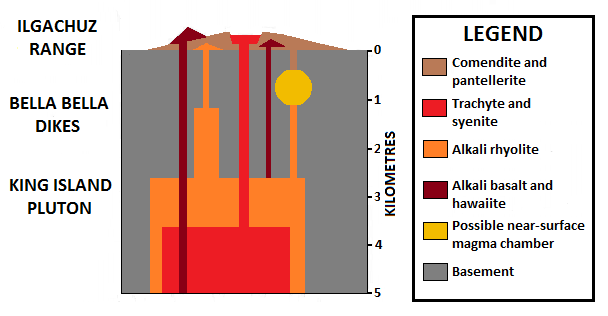
Depth relationships and compositional correlation of plutonic, hypabyssal and volcanic rocks exposed in the western Anahim Belt

Three large shield volcanoes and two locally extensive volcanic fields form the central AVB. They are chemically bimodal, consisting mainly of mafic and felsic lavas with almost no intermediate lavas having been verified. The shield volcanoes share a similar evolution, having formed by an early stage of predominately voluminous felsic volcanism and a late stage of relatively minor mafic volcanism. Although the felsic lavas produced during the early evolutionary stage were high in silica content, they remained fluid enough to build felsic shields.

The volcanic fields consist of lavas that range from basanites and trachybasalts to evolved trachytes and phonolites. They comprise several small volcanoes that are in the form of cones, domes and plugs, most of which likely experienced episodic and short-lived activity. In contrast, the few larger structures in each volcanic field experienced multiple eruptive events over a longer timespan. Both fields were active contemporaneously throughout much of the Pleistocene.

==== Shield volcanoes ====
The Rainbow Range is a 30 km (19 mi) diameter, moderately dissected shield volcano that was active 8.7 to 6.7 million years ago. Four volcanic episodes characterized by highly fluid alkaline and peralkaline lava flows created an 845 m (2,772 ft) thick assemblage exposed on the north flank. A basal sequence of comenditic trachyte flows are unconformably overlain by flows and flow breccias of mugearite which in turn are overlain by a 40 to 60 m (130 to 200 ft) thick sequence of columnar-jointed comendite flows. Late stage volcanism resulted in the creation of scattered hawaiite dikes, plugs and minor capping flows over the north flank. Accompanying the northeastern flank is Anahim Peak, a trachyte plug surrounded by a pile of hawaiite flows that are four to eight times thicker than those of the Rainbow Range. The abnormal thicknesses of the Anahim Peak hawaiite flows coupled with a significantly coarser-grained groundmass and higher percentage of phenocrysts than the upper portions of the flows suggest that they were ponded during eruption, possibly as lava lakes within a former cinder cone.

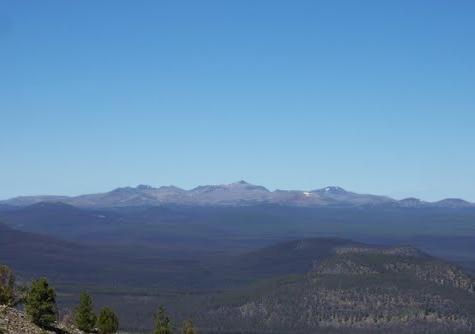
The Itcha Range from the south

To the east lies the Ilgachuz Range, a slightly smaller and less deeply dissected shield volcano that formed 6.1 to 4.0 million years ago. Its nearly circular and gently sloping structure, 25 km (16 mi) in diameter, consists of four assemblages that were deposited in six major episodes of activity. The lower shield assemblage represents the oldest exposed rocks in the Ilgachuz Range. It comprises pyroclastic breccias, domes and lava flows of alkali rhyolite that have been hydrothermally altered. The overlying upper shield assemblage, which forms the bulk of the Ilgachuz Range, encompasses a series of comendite and pantellerite flows and domes that are interbedded with flows of alkali basalt and hawaiite. Formation of the shield was followed by collapse of a small central caldera in which the intracaldera assemblage was deposited. This assemblage consists of a 150 m (490 ft) thick sequence of tuffs that are overlain by a ponded single cooling unit of trachyte more than 165 m (541 ft) in thickness. The postcaldera assemblage comprises alkali basalt and hawaiite flows that issued from flank vents and from a few small vents within the central caldera. These are the youngest lavas of the Ilgachuz Range.

The Itcha Range is the easternmost and youngest of the three AVB shield volcanoes, having formed between 3.8 and 0.8 million years ago. With a diameter of 15 km (9.3 mi), the Itcha Range is also the smallest AVB shield. Its structure is unique among the AVB shields in that it consists of small coalescing volcanic units rather than a stratiform volcanic pile. The basal unit comprises a series of aphyric trachyte flows and domes with minor flow-banded rhyolite, rhyolitic tuffs and thin hawaiite flows. This unit is overlain by a sequence of alkali-feldspar porphyritic trachytes which occur as pyroclastic deposits as well as small lava flows and domes. These trachytes are overlain and intruded by alkali-feldspar porphyritic quartz-trachytic and trachytic plugs, lava flows, pyroclastic flows, debris flows and dikes in the middle of the shield. The uppermost shield-forming unit consists of megacrystic trachyte flows that are distributed throughout the western part of the Itcha Range. Formation of the shield was followed by the eruption of basanites, alkali basalts and hawaiites from small cinder cones, tuff rings and fissures in the eastern half of the shield.

==== Volcanic fields ====
The Satah Mountain volcanic field is a linear region of cones and domes extending 50 km (31 mi) south from the Itcha Range to just north of Chantslar Lake. Volcanism along the entire length of the volcanic field 2.5 to 1.4 million years ago was characterized by the eruption of generally small volumes of magma that erupted at various times and at various locations. The eruption rates were high enough to build a north–south trending ridge upon which most of the volcanoes are located. This elongated feature, known as Satah Ridge, rises above the surrounding plateau surface with an average topographic prominence of 200 m (660 ft). The alignment of the Satah Mountain volcanic field corresponds with the orientation of two sets of normal faults in the Itcha Range, suggesting that volcanism there may have been controlled by a fault system. More than 20 volcanoes have been identified throughout the Satah Mountain volcanic field, with Satah Mountain and Mount Punkutlaenkut being the largest. Smaller centres include Jorgensen Hill, Sugarloaf Mountain, Turbo Lake, White Creek and Holte Creek.

The Baldface Mountain volcanic field is a group of scattered cones 25 km (16 mi) east of the Itcha Range. Argon–argon dating of seven cones indicate the volcanic field was active 2.5 to 0.91 million years ago, during which time the Itcha Range and the Satah Mountain volcanic field were also areas of volcanicity. Baldface Mountain is the largest and one of the oldest volcanoes in the Baldface Mountain volcanic field. It consists of a 2.37 million year old cone of aphanitic phonolite and porphyritic trachyte with feldspar phenocrysts. A basaltic lava flow near the head of Moore Creek has an age of 3.91 million years, similar to the oldest rocks known from the Itcha Range or the Chilcotin Group basalts of the surrounding plateau. The relation of this flow to the Baldface Mountain volcanic field is in question as its source and extent have not been identified.

=== Eastern segment ===
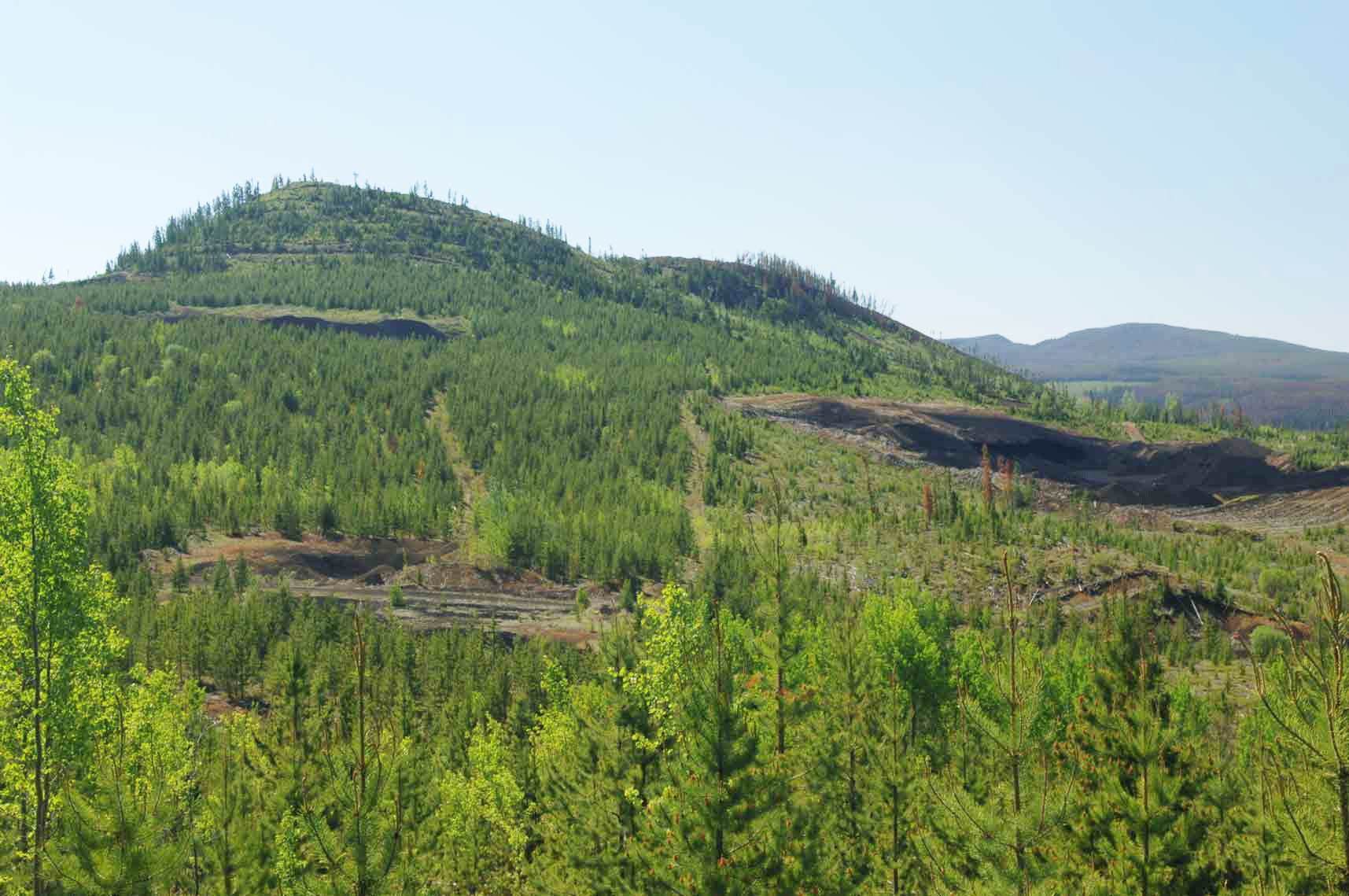
Nazko Cone, the easternmost and youngest volcano in the Anahim Volcanic Belt

Nazko Cone is the main eruptive centre forming the eastern segment of the AVB. It consists of overlapping piles of basaltic flows and cones that were formed during at least three eruptive periods. The first volcanic episode is represented by a subaerial basalt flow that forms the base of the volcano. It was deposited during a Pleistocene interglacial stage 0.34 million years ago and is extensively eroded. The second episode is constituted by a subglacial mound of hyaloclastite that formed under the Cordilleran Ice Sheet, perhaps during the Fraser Glaciation which took place between 25,000 and 10,000 years ago. It forms the western side of Nazko Cone and is dominated by blocks of highly vesicular, glassy basalt. The third episode is defined by coalescing pyroclastic cones and associated lava flows that formed subaerially during the Holocene. Radiocarbon dating of bog peat above and below a tephra layer near Nazko Cone suggest that the latest eruption took place about 7,200 years ago. This is the only known Holocene eruption from Nazko Cone as no other tephra layers have been identified.

From 9 October 2007 to 15 May 2008, a series of earthquakes measuring up to 2.9 magnitude occurred in the Nechako Basin about 20 km (12 mi) west of Nazko Cone. Most of them occurred 25 to 31 km (16 to 19 mi) below the surface, indicating they originated within the lowermost crust. Analysis of seismic waves suggest that the earthquake swarm was caused by brittle failure and fracturing of rock at depth from magma intrusion. No volcanic eruption was likely as the number and size of the tremors were too small. Although these volcano tectonic earthquakes were too small to be felt, they generated substantial local interest as they represented a significant concentration of seismic activity within the Anahim Volcanic Belt.

== See also ==
- List of volcanoes in Canada
- Volcanism of Western Canada
