= Anahim =

Anahim is a name used for several features in British Columbia, Canada, derived from the name of Chief Anahim, a leader of the Tsilhqot'in people in the mid-19th Century:

- Anahim Lake, British Columbia, a community in the west-central part of the province
- Anahim Lake Airport, the airport of the community of Anahim Lake
- Anahim Peak, a volcano in the Anahim Volcanic Belt
- Anahim hotspot, an inferred mantle plume feeding the Anahim Volcanic Belt
- Anahim Volcanic Belt, a linear belt of volcanoes

Various Indian Reserves of the Tl'etinqox-t'in Government are named Anahim No. 10, Anahim No. 11 etc. Their main reserve community is known by a variant name, Anaham.
