= Queen Charlotte Basin =

Geological feature in British Columbia, Canada

- structural basin
- Approximate Center of Queen Charlotte Basin
- Coordinates: 52.2°N 129.8°W
- Location: British Columbia, Canada
- Part of: Pacific Margin of North America

Area
  - Total: 40,000 km^{2} (15,000 sq mi)

The Queen Charlotte Basin is a structural basin mostly beneath the continental shelf offshore, between Haida Gwaii, Vancouver Island, and the British Columbia mainland, roughly coincident with the physiographic region named the Hecate Depression.

The term Queen Charlotte Basin normally refers to the Cenozoic rocks, but these are underlain by what seems to be a thick Mesozoic succession. The Queen Charlotte Basin was formed by periods of extension, including thinning and volcanism during the mid-Cenozoic era. The large Cenozoic plutons that magnetic data suggest exist in the southeastern part of the Queen Charlotte Basin seem to be related to the Anahim hotspot.

== Geology ==
Renewed interest in western Canadian shelf basins results from widespread expectations that the long-standing government moratorium on offshore exploration there may soon be lifted. The best oil prospects seem to exist in Cretaceous reservoirs in the southwestern part of the Queen Charlotte Basin, in western Queen Charlotte Sound.

With widespread oil seeps from rocks of all ages, two dozen wells were drilled in the Queen Charlotte and Tofino areas before the 1970s; many land areas were mapped in the 1980s and 1990s. However, Vancouver Island and Haida Gwaii mostly lack caprock. Hecate Strait seems to lack adequate source and reservoir rocks, and the offshore wells did not significantly test the Mesozoic horizons. Rocks on the mainland are crystalline. The Tofino, Winona, Georgia and Juan de Fuca basin lack significant known source rocks. By contrast, southwestern Queen Charlotte Basin seems to contain a stack of source, reservoir and caprock strata, largely at oil-window burial depths, as well as large block-fault trap structures.

While some workers (e.g., Lyatsky and Haggart, 1993; Lyatsky, 2006) regard the Mesozoic horizons to be the primary oil-exploration targets, others (e.g., Dietrich, 1995; Hannigan et al., 2001) focus more on the overlying Cenozoic rocks. Rohr and Dietrich (1992) considered the Queen Charlotte Basin to have formed largely by strike-slip movements in the Cenozoic. On the other hand, Lyatsky (1993, 2006) considered significant strike-slip movements to be impossible in this basin since at least the Late Oligocene, based on kinematic indicators and cross-cutting relationships of major faults and dated dikes; instead, he viewed the basin's Cenozoic evolution to be a product of reactivation of older networks of block-bounding faults.

Economic basement in the Queen Charlotte Basin area is massive, thick Upper Triassic flood basalts, underlain onshore by partly metamorphosed older rocks. Above, high-quality source rocks exist in the ~1,000 metres (0.62 mi)-thick Upper Triassic-Lower Jurassic assemblage, with oil-prone Type I and II kerogen and TOC (total organic carbon) up to 11%. Geochemical evidence suggests these rocks provided most of the basin's oil, and a major pulse of oil generation and migration was in the Cenozoic. The overlying Upper Jurassic-Upper Cretaceous clastic succession, ~3,000 metres (1.9 mi) thick, has negligible source potential but contains high-quality reservoirs with largely secondary porosity of ~15% or more. Above, mostly offshore, lie Cenozoic mudstone, sandstone and volcanic deposits, up to ~6,000 metres (3.7 mi) thick in some fault-bounded depocenters.

The Cenozoic deposits have gas-prone Type III and II kerogen, with up to 2.5% TOC locally. However, clay products of feldspar decomposition greatly degrade their permeability, especially at basal levels. Reservoir-quality sandstone facies are found largely near the top of this unit, where migration routes from below and the seal above may be inadequate. The Cenozoic deposits thus seem to be predominantly caprock, perhaps with some secondary exploration targets.

Stratigraphic and sedimentological studies indicate the Triassic-Jurassic source rocks were deposited in a broad shelfal basin encompassing this entire region and beyond. However, the Cretaceous basin was confined to western Haida Gwaii and northwestern Vancouver Island, with uplands to the east shedding detritus. Western Queen Charlotte Sound was probably part of the same Cretaceous basin, while eastern Queen Charlotte Sound and Hecate Strait largely lost their pre-existing source rocks and received few, non-marine, Cretaceous deposits. Cenozoic caprock, with thickness variable block to block, then blanketed Hecate Strait and Queen Charlotte Sound.

Western Queen Charlotte Sound should thus contain a favourable source-reservoir-seal stack. Gravity data also indicate a great thickness of undrilled low-density (sedimentary?) rocks is present beneath western Queen Charlotte Sound but not elsewhere in the Queen Charlotte Basin.

Caprock-breaching faults are sparser in Queen Charlotte Sound than in northern parts of the basin; the Queen Charlotte Basin is not overpressured. Regional geological and geophysical correlations suggest the major Mesozoic block-fault networks were reactivated in the Cenozoic. Seismic and gravity data show the fault-bounded Cenozoic depocenters and raised blocks to be comparatively broad in western Queen Charlotte Sound.

The caveats are several. Cretaceous rocks, deposited near their provenance areas, tend to be petrologically immature, and secondary porosity in them may be hard to predict. Buried source rocks beneath the deepest depocenters may be overmature. Some traps may be breached by Neogene faults: one offshore well encountered oil staining, suggesting oil passed through these Cenozoic rocks and escaped. A major influence on local hydrocarbon-maturation levels on Haida Gwaii is proximity to the mostly Jurassic and Cenozoic igneous plutons. Similar potential-field anomalies suggest massive igneous bodies may be present beneath eastern Queen Charlotte Sound, and correlations with mainland igneous suites of the Anahim Volcanic Belt put their age at Miocene. The pluton-related(?) magnetic anomalies do not seem to significantly extent into western Queen Charlotte Sound.

== See also ==
- Anahim hotspot
