= Whitetop Mountain (British Columbia) =

Mountain in British Columbia, Canada

- Location within British Columbia
- Interactive map of Whitetop Mountain

Highest point
- Elevation: 1,525 m (5,003 ft)
- Prominence: 208 m (682 ft)
- Listing: Volcanoes of Canada
- Coordinates: 52°38′55″N 124°33′21″W

Geography
- Country: Canada
- Province: British Columbia
- District: Range 3 Coast Land District
- Parent range: Chilcotin Plateau
- Topo map: NTS 93C10 Downton Creek

Geology
- Volcanic belt: Anahim Volcanic Belt

Whitetop Mountain is a forested hill in the West-Central Interior of British Columbia, Canada. It is on the northwest side of junction of the Chilcotin River and Downton Creek. Whitetop is a volcanic cone of the Chilcotin Plateau and Anahim Volcanic Belt.
