= Satah Mountain =

Mountain in British Columbia, Canada

- Mount Lion
- Location within British Columbia

Highest point
- Elevation: 1,921 m (6,302 ft)
- Prominence: 419 m (1,375 ft)
- Coordinates: 52°28′34″N 124°41′22″W

Naming
- Native name: Tŝi-t’ax (Chilcotin)

Geography
- Location: British Columbia, Canada
- Parent range: Chilcotin Plateau
- Topo map: NTS 93C7 Satah Mountain

Geology
- Rock age: Pleistocene
- Mountain type: Volcanic cone
- Volcanic belt: Anahim Volcanic Belt
- Volcanic field: Satah Mountain volcanic field

Satah Mountain is a twin-peaked mountain in the West-Central Interior of British Columbia, Canada. It is southeast of Punkutlaenkut Lake and east of the community of Anahim Lake in Range 3 Coast Land District.

== History ==
The name of the mountain was adopted 13 March 1947 on topographic map 93/SW. Prior to this, the mountain was given the name Mount Lion which appeared on 2T268, a plan drawn in 1923 by W. Merston who was a member of the Association of British Columbia Land Surveyors (BCLS). The name Satah is Chilcotin in origin, meaning "Of the Sun and Moon".

Merston made some land surveys in the Upper Chilcotin Valley and a triangulation and topographical survey over an area extending eastward from Anahim Peak to the 124th meridian. The topographical work extended over the Itcha Range, which lies 25 km (16 mi) north-northwest of Satah Mountain.

== Geology ==
Satah Mountain is a complex volcanic cone of trachyte, benmoreite and basaltic trachyandesite. It contains two summits that rise between 300 and 400 m (980 and 1,310 ft) above the surrounding plateau. The western summit is flat-topped and resembles a tuya whereas the eastern summit retains the morphology of a cone with its southwestern rim having been breached by a 180 m (590 ft) in diameter crater. A small breached scoria ring on the northern flank of Satah Mountain appears largely unmodified by glacial erosion, implying that it might be younger than the main edifice.

Satah Mountain is one of the largest volcanoes in the Satah Mountain volcanic field (SMVF). Polygenetic in nature, the volcano was sporadically active 1.83–1.77 million years ago during the Early Pleistocene. This contrasts with most SMVF volcanoes, which are smaller in volume and likely had episodic and short-lived activity. The only other polygenetic volcano in the SMVF is Mount Punkutlaenkut, a volcanic cone 7 km (4.3 mi) west-northwest of Satah Mountain.

== See also ==
- List of volcanoes in Canada
