= Anahim Peak =

Mountain in British Columbia, Canada

- Bes But'a, Bis Nadiʔah
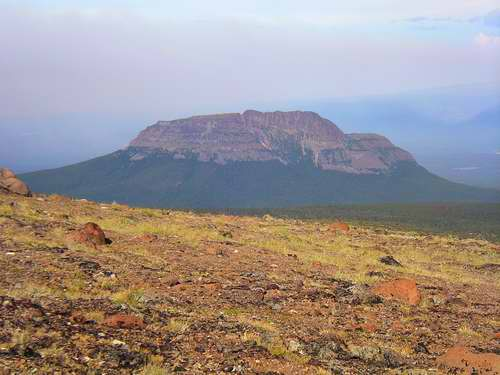
- West side of Anahim Peak

Highest point
- Elevation: 1,897 m (6,224 ft)
- Prominence: 542 m (1,778 ft)
- Listing: Mountains of British Columbia
- Coordinates: 52°45′28″N 125°37′31″W

Naming
- Native name: Bis Nadiʔah (Chilcotin)

Geography
- Location within British Columbia
- Location in Tweedsmuir South Provincial Park
- Location: British Columbia, Canada
- District: Range 3 Coast Land District
- Parent range: Chilcotin Plateau
- Topo map: NTS 93C13 Ulkatcho

Geology
- Rock age: 6.7 million years
- Mountain type: Volcanic plug
- Volcanic belt: Anahim Volcanic Belt

Anahim Peak, also spelled Anaham, ʔAnaghim, or Anaheim, is a volcanic cone in the Anahim Volcanic Belt in British Columbia, Canada, located 39 km (24 mi) northwest of Anahim Lake and 11 km (7 mi) east of Tsitsutl Peak. It was formed when the North American Plate moved over a hotspot, similar to the one feeding the Hawaiian Islands, called the Anahim hotspot. It is one of the several volcanoes in the Anahim Volcanic Belt that stands out all by itself, rising from the Chilcotin Plateau, between the Rainbow Range and the Ilgachuz Range and near the headwaters of the Dean River.

== Name ==
The Carrier (Dakelh) name for Anahim Peak is Bes But'a, meaning "obsidian peak." To the Tsilhqot'in Nation, the mountain is called Bis Nadiʔah (also meaning "obsidian peak"), or Tŝi-bis Gunlin Xadalgwenlh ("mountain where there is obsidian stone"). The word bes (bis in Tŝilhqot’in) is anglicised as "beece", another word for obsidian and also an early designation for this mountain. The name Anahim is that of Chief Anahim, a leader of the Tsilhqot'in people in the mid-19th Century. The Nuxalk (ItNuxalkmc) name for Anahim Peak is Anuxim, meaning shining out, or shining on the inside. In the origin story of mount Nusq'lst, mount Anuxim is the father of Tl'isla, the wife of mount Nusq'lst.

== Area and history ==
Anahim Peak was a significant source of obsidian for the Nuxalk, Tsilhqot'in, and Dakelh peoples. Obsidian was desirable because extremely sharp arrowheads and cutting knives could be made from it. It was also used for jewellery. Anahim obsidian was traded widely all over the BC Interior and up and down the Coast from Bella Coola. Red ochre was used in paint and decoration was also taken from this area. Anahim Peak is not far from the small community of Anahim Lake.

== See also ==
- List of volcanoes of Canada
- Anahim hotspot
- Anahim Volcanic Belt
- Volcanism in Canada
- Anahim (disambiguation)
