= Okhotsk-Chukotka Volcanic Belt =

Geological formation

The Okhotsk-Chukotka Volcanic Belt (OCVB) is a Cretaceous volcanic belt in the Russian Far East region of northeast Asia.

It is found in Chukotka Autonomous Okrug and Khabarovsk Krai of northeastern Russia.

== Geology ==
The volcanic belt is one of the largest subduction-zone related volcanic provinces in the world, stretching some 3,200 kilometres (2,000 mi) and comprising about 2 million km^{3} of volcanic and plutonic material.

The volcanism within the volcanic belt was related to the subduction of the ancient Kula Plate, which moved in a northward direction about 55 million years ago.

Data collected from hand samples in lower units and one upper unit of the northern part of the belt were dated with ^{40}Ar/^{39}Ar isotopic dating. The lower units ranged 87.94 to 87.08 Ma (millions of years old), while the upper section sample was dated at 87.55 Ma. This suggests volcanism in this part of the belt was short lived and occurred over only a few million years.
