= Baldface Mountain =

Mountain in British Columbia, Canada

- Location within British Columbia
- Interactive map of Baldface Mountain

Highest point
- Elevation: 1,798 m (5,899 ft)
- Prominence: 208 m (682 ft)
- Listing: Mountains of British Columbia; Volcanoes of Canada
- Coordinates: 52°45′34″N 124°31′53″W

Geography
- Country: Canada
- Province: British Columbia
- District: Range 3 Coast Land District
- Parent range: Chilcotin Plateau
- Topo map: NTS 93C15 Kushya River

Geology
- Rock age: Pleistocene
- Mountain type: Volcanic cone
- Volcanic belt: Anahim Volcanic Belt
- Volcanic field: Baldface Mountain volcanic field

Baldface Mountain is a conical butte-like summit in the West-Central Interior of British Columbia, Canada. It is east of Itcha Lake and northeast of the community of Anahim Lake in Range 3 Coast Land District.

The name of the mountain was adopted 7 February 1947 on topographic map 93/SW, as identified in the 1930 BC Gazetteer. Prior to this, the name Mount Baldface appeared on maps.

== Geology ==
Baldface Mountain is a trachytic–phonolitic volcanic cone in the Anahim Volcanic Belt that was active 2.37 million years ago. A locally extensive field of volcanic cones is centered on Baldface Mountain and is judiciously called the Baldface Mountain volcanic field (BMVF). Baldface Mountain is the largest edifice in this volcanic field and is one of the few BMVF volcanoes known to have produced felsic rocks.

A small trachytic knob just south of Baldface Mountain has a slightly older age of 2.52 million years and is the oldest known BMVF feature. The close proximity between this knob and Baldface Mountain indicates that they might be part of a larger volcanic centre and/or a single period of intermittent volcanism.
