= Bimodal volcanism =

Eruption of both mafic and felsic lavas from a single volcanic centre

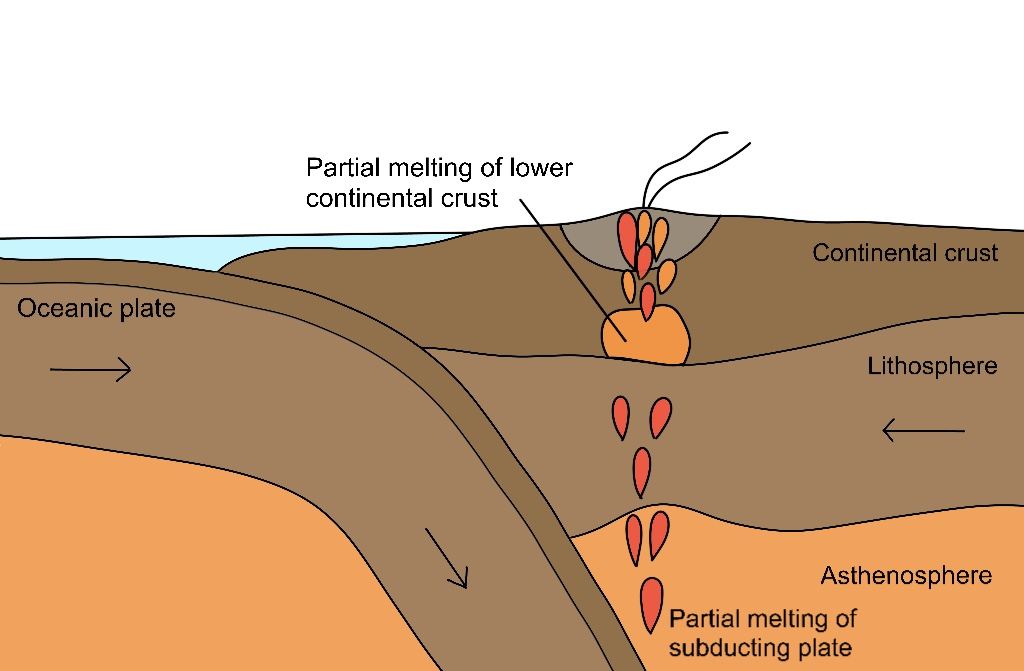
Mechanism

Bimodal volcanism is the eruption of both mafic and felsic lavas from a single volcanic centre with little or no lavas of intermediate composition. This type of volcanism is normally associated with areas of extensional tectonics, particularly rifts.

== Occurrence ==
Most occurrences of bimodal volcanism are associated with thinning of the crust and the presence of such rocks in metamorphic sequences has been used to provide evidence for past rifting events. Most examples come from areas of active continental rifting such as the Basin and Range Province. Bimodal volcanism has also been described from areas of transtension, the early phases of back-arc basin formation and in the products of both continental and oceanic hotspots (e.g. Yellowstone, Anahim and the Canary Islands).

== Mechanism of formation ==
Bimodal volcanism is normally explained as a result of partial melting of the crust, creating granitic magmas, during the emplacement of large volumes of relatively hot basaltic magma from a mantle source. The two magma types then form separate magma chambers giving rise to periodic eruption of both types of lava.

== See also ==
- Volcanism of the Mount Edziza volcanic complex
