= Nazko Cone =

Active volcano in British Columbia, Canada

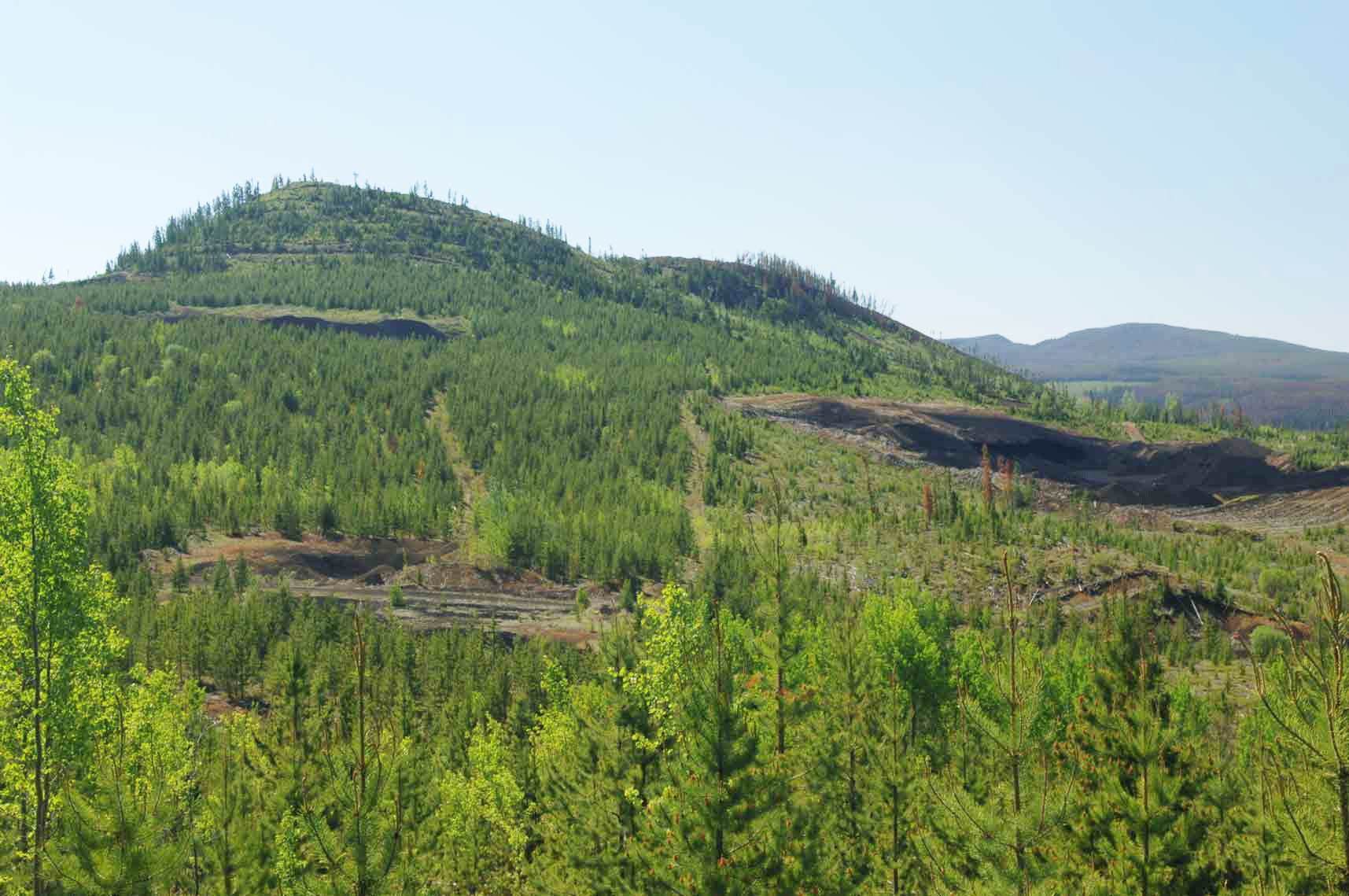
- Nazko Cone, the easternmost and youngest volcano overlying the Anahim hotspot

Highest point
- Elevation: 1,230 m (4,040 ft)
- Listing: List of volcanoes in Canada
- Coordinates: 52°55′38″N 123°44′2″W

Geography
- Location within British Columbia
- Interactive map of Nazko Cone
- Location: British Columbia, Canada

Geology
- Rock age: Pleistocene
- Mountain type: Cinder cone
- Volcanic belt: Anahim Volcanic Belt
- Last eruption: 5220 BCE ± 100 years

Nazko Cone /ˈnæzkoʊ/ is a small potentially active basaltic cinder cone in central British Columbia, Canada, located 75 km west of Quesnel and 150 kilometers southwest of Prince George. It is considered the easternmost volcano in the Anahim Volcanic Belt. The small tree-covered cone rises 120 m above the Chilcotin-Nechako Plateau and rests on glacial till. It was formed in three episodes of activity, the first of which took place during the Pleistocene interglacial stage about 340,000 years ago. The second stage produced a large hyaloclastite scoria mound erupted beneath the Cordilleran Ice Sheet during the Pleistocene. Its last eruption produced two small lava flows that traveled 1 km to the west, along with a blanket of volcanic ash that extends several km to the north and east of the cone.

== Geology and history ==
=== Origins ===
Nazko Cone probably began erupting about 340,000 years ago and has grown steadily since then. Like all of the Anahim volcanoes, Nazko Cone has its origins in the Anahim hotspot—a plume of magma rising from deep in the Earth's mantle. The hotspot remains in a fixed position, while the North American Plate drifts over it at a rate of 2 to 3.3 centimetres per year. The upwelling of the hot magma creates volcanoes, and each individual volcano erupts for a few million years before the movement of the plate carries it away from the rising magma.

The hotspot has existed for at least 13 million years, and the Anahim Volcanic Belt stretches almost 600 kilometres (400 mi) away from the hotspot. Currently, the hotspot lies under Nazko Cone, which is the youngest volcano in the Anahim Volcanic Belt.

=== 7200 BP Eruption of Nazko Cone ===
The eruptive cycle of Nazko Cone 7200 years ago started with the eruption of two different progressions of fluid lava flows, an older grey basalt overlain by a younger, darker black basalt. The passive eruptions were followed by a period of explosive eruptions. This explosive activity built three overlapping cinder cones near the end of the explosive phase of activity. The last phase of explosive activity spread tephra to the north and east of the cones. The deepest deposits near the cones are over 3 m deep and thin to less than a few centimetres only a few kilometres away, which suggests that the explosive eruptions at Nazko Cone were fairly small. However, the last eruption from Nazko Cone could have started forest fires, since there is charcoal inside the tephra layer.

=== Recent activity ===
The volcano has been dormant since the 7200 BP eruption. On October 10, 2007, a small swarm of earthquakes appeared 20 kilometres west of Nazko Cone. Most of these earthquakes were magnitude 1.0 or less; some as strong as M 3.1 or 3.2 were centered 25 kilometres below the surface. The cause of this seismic activity is believed to be the upwelling of magma because the area is not close to any faults or tectonic plate boundaries.

== Hazards ==
Future eruptions from Nazko Cone are unlikely to cause many fatalities, due to the region's remoteness. There is active logging and ranching in the region, and people engaged in these activities are at some risk. Lava flows are likely to flow only a few kilometres from the volcano which could possibly start forest fires in the dry region. Any future eruption is likely to affect low flying air traffic only, since eruptions would likely be in the form of Hawaiian eruption- lava fountains that create small cinder cones and lava flows rather than voluminous ash clouds.

== Monitoring ==
Nazko Cone has been an intensively monitored volcano by the Geological Survey of Canada since October 10, 2007.

One of the most important tools is seismometry. About 5 seismometers were set up around Nazko Cone to enable scientists to measure the intensities and locations of hundreds of small earthquakes every day. Since then, there have been more than 1000 small earthquakes recorded. Earthquakes can begin to increase years before an eruption actually starts.

Another type of seismic activity occurs in the hours preceding an eruption. So-called harmonic tremor is a continuous "rumble" which contrasts with the normal seismic activity of sudden shocks and is believed to be caused by the rapid movement of magma underground. Volcanic tremor normally indicates an imminent eruption, although it may also be caused by shallow intrusions of magma which do not reach the surface.

Another important indicator of what is happening underground is the shape of the volcano. Tiltmeters measure very small changes in the profile of the volcano, and sensitive equipment measures distances between points on the volcano. As magma fills the shallow reservoirs below the summit, the mountain inflates.

== Recent history ==
Nazko Cone was staked for mining its cinder and scoria in the early 1990s by the Canadian Pumice Corporation, and has since been steadily reduced to produce red industrial aggregate for landscaping.

Before mining, the Nazko Cone was also a unique ecosystem. The vegetation included a complex of species. Very large old Douglas fir trees were common, growing in some of the more soil-like ash and lava. White spruce was surprisingly common, although severely stunted, whereas lodgepole pine was not.

There were some shallow caves and hollows below the volcano. To the west, following the lava flow mentioned above, is a unique wetland which appears to be saturated ash. What makes it unique is the fact that normally wetlands are saturated organic material such as peat moss. The wetland at Nazko Cone, however, is mixed organic and lava or ash, and the resultant ecosystem is quite unexpected.

== Geothermal Potential ==
High heat flow in the Nazko Cone area is being evaluated as a potential source of geothermal heating.

== See also ==
- Anahim hotspot
- Anahim Volcanic Belt
- Ilgachuz Range
- Itcha Range
- List of volcanoes in Canada
- Rainbow Range
- Volcanology of Canada
- Volcanology of Western Canada
