= Phonotephrite =

Strongly alkaline volcanic rock

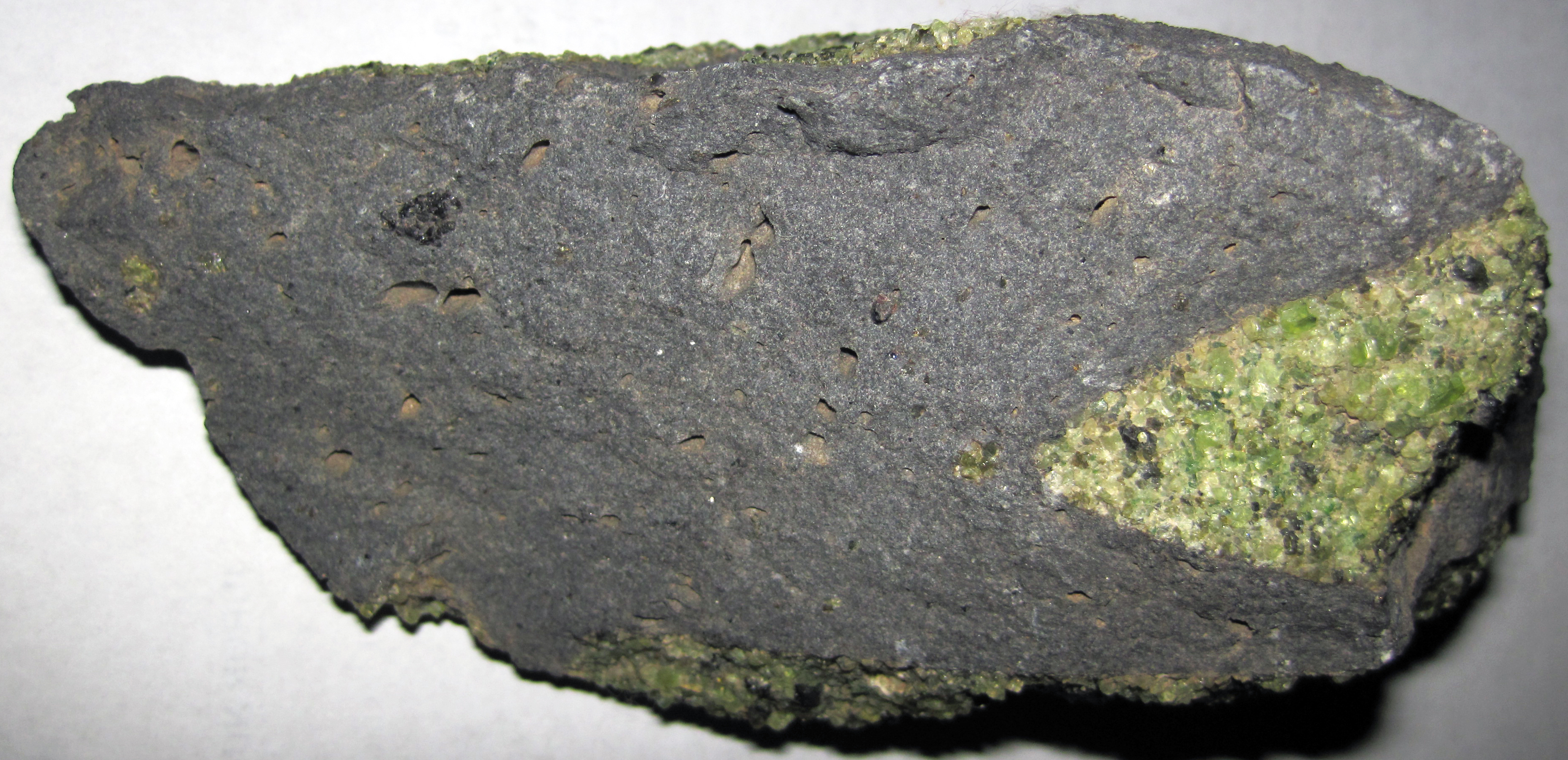
Peridotite xenoliths (green) in phonotephrite from Peridot Mesa, Arizona

Phonotephrite or phono-tephrite is a strongly alkaline volcanic rock with a composition between phonolite and tephrite. This unusual igneous rock contains 7–12% alkali content and 45–53% silica content (see TAS diagram). It can be described as a mafic phonolite or a potassic tephrite. Phonotephrite lava flows and volcanic cones have been identified in Antarctica (e.g. Mount Erebus), Europe (e.g. Mount Vesuvius), North America (e.g. Satah Mountain volcanic field) and Africa (e.g. Jbel Saghro).

== See also ==
- Tephriphonolite
