= John Cassidy (seismologist) =

Canadian seismologist

John Francis Cassidy (born 1959) is a Canadian seismologist and an adjunct professor of the University of Victoria in British Columbia, Canada. He lives in the town of Sidney on southern Vancouver Island and is employed by Natural Resources Canada. Cassidy has participated in mapping the structure of the Earth using seismic waves, earthquake hazard research, working with engineers and emergency response organizations and public outreach activities, including the media, educators and the public. Throughout his work with the Geological Survey of Canada in the past 20 years, Cassidy has published over 100 public and scientific interest articles.
