= Sunday stone =

Accretion of calcium carbonate in coal mines

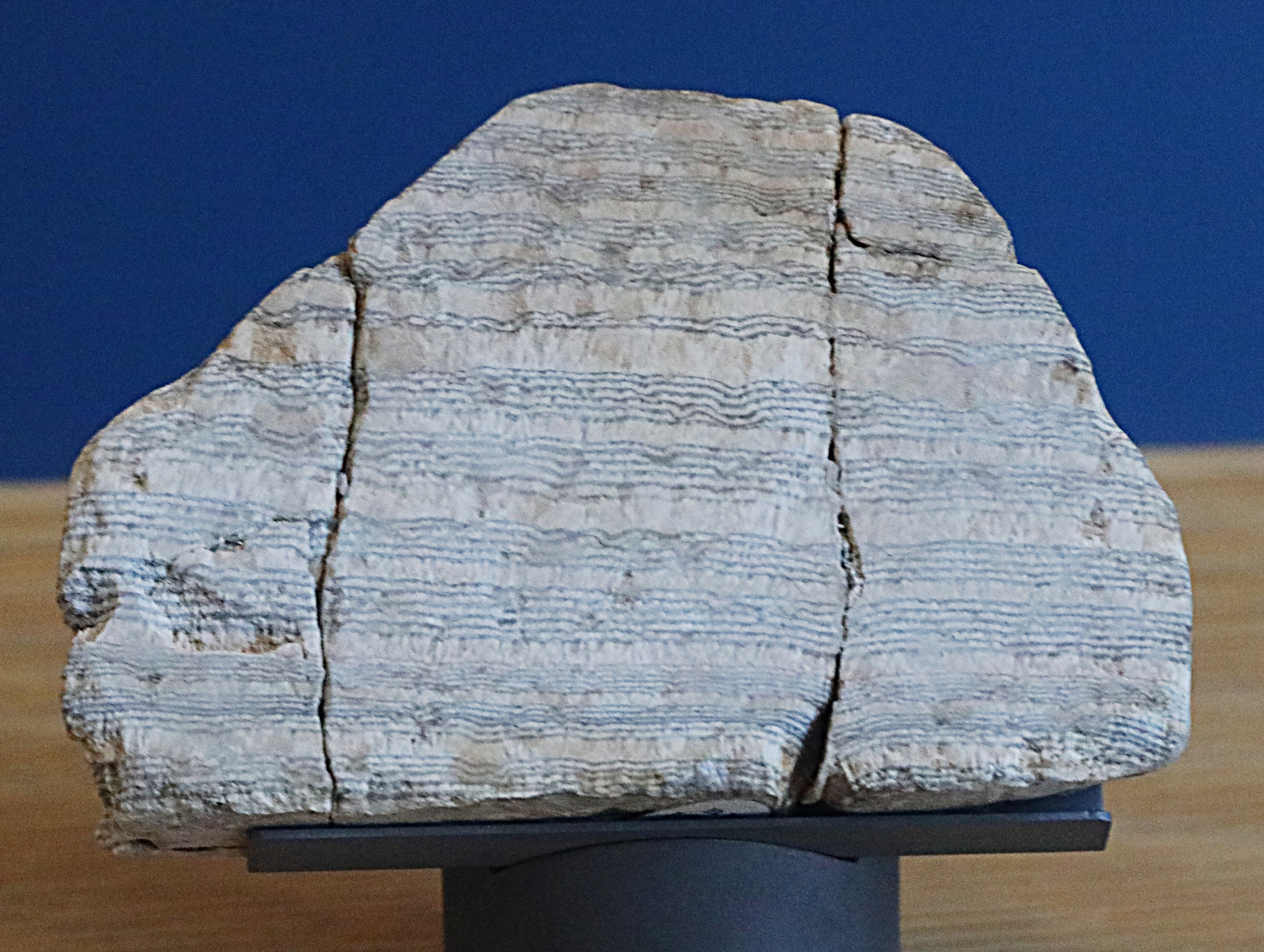
A piece of Sunday stone in the Natural History Museum, London

"Sunday stone" is an artificial stone composed of calcium carbonate that formed on the walls of drainage pipes in some coal mines. It is striped due to the differing levels of coal dust produced during the day and night shifts. In some cases, a broader stripe is generated every seven days due to active mining not taking place on Sunday. Broader stripes would also appear when work stopped for other reasons. In one case, a broad stripe coincided with workers being given the day off to view a cockfight. Breaks of more than a day would produce an even broader stripe, such as when Christmas fell on a Monday.

The Sunday stone would over time block the drainage pipes necessitating their replacement. Where mines have improved ventilation, reducing the level of coal dust in the air, Sunday stone has ceased to be formed.
