= King Island Pluton =

The extent of the Anahim Volcanic Belt, including the King Island Pluton

The King Island Pluton is a mid-to-late Miocene intrusion of syenite and alkali granite on the Central Coast of British Columbia, Canada. It is over 20 km (12 mi) long and 2.5 km (1.6 mi) wide, extending from King Island in the west to the mainland in the east. The pluton is exposed in 1,000 m (3,300 ft) cliffs along the Dean and Burke channels west of Bella Coola.

The King Island Pluton is petrographically similar to the shield volcanoes in the central Anahim Volcanic Belt. As a result, the pluton is thought to represent the magma chamber of an extinct volcanic centre that has since eroded away. At the time of its formation, the pluton was emplaced 2 to 5 km (1.2 to 3.1 mi) below the surface.
