= Volcano tectonic earthquake =

Earthquake caused by magma movement

A volcano tectonic earthquake or volcano earthquake is caused by the movement of magma beneath the surface of the Earth. The movement results in pressure changes where the rock around the magma has a change in stress. At some point, this stress can cause the rock to break or move. This seismic activity is used by scientists to monitor volcanoes. The earthquakes may also be related to dike intrusion and/or occur as earthquake swarms. Usually they are characterised by high seismic frequency and lack the pattern of a main shock followed by a decaying aftershock distribution of fault related tectonic earthquakes.

== Cause of volcano tectonic earthquakes ==
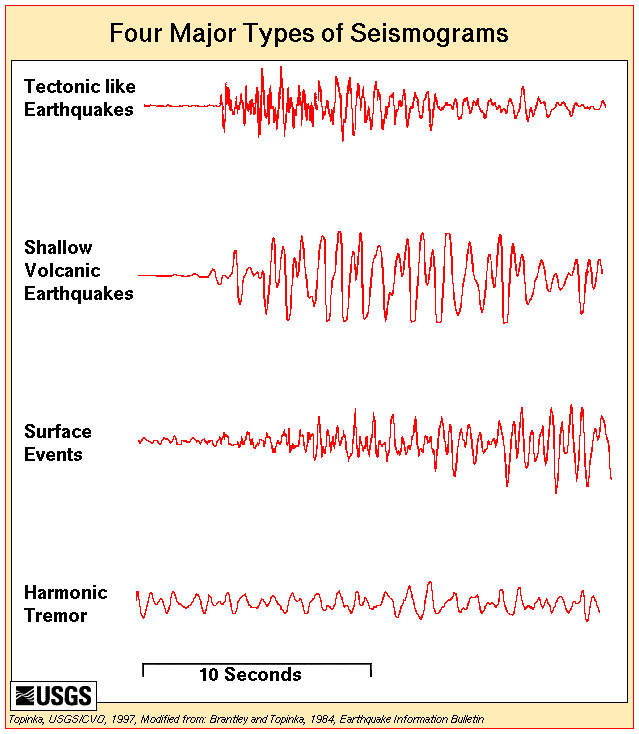
Four types of seismograms, or seismic signatures

One possible scenario resulting in a possible volcano tectonic earthquake occurs in tectonic subduction zones. The compression of plates at these subduction zones forces the magma beneath them to move. Magma can not move through the newly compressed crust as easily. This means it tends to pool in magma chambers beneath the surface and between the converging tectonic plates. Many of the famous and most well known volcanoes are of this type, including those of the Ring of Fire. As the plates move, magma underground may be forced in and out of these chambers and form intrusions into surrounding crust. This movement is capable of causing the unstable rocks around it to cave in or shift. The movement of this magma as described, causes measurable seismic activity. Where plates diverge such as at mid-ocean ridges the magma also can move into storage chambers and form intrusions again causing shifts in the rocks around them that can be detected as earthquakes. This is separate from earthquakes directly related to faults. However it is known than tectonic earthquake triggering has occurred with some volcanic eruptions, and there may be other associations of these in place and time with some eruptions, which could cause confusion because of the similar terminology.

Scientists monitoring volcanoes have noticed that magma movement may lead to earthquake swarms depending on the movement of magma and the interaction with rock beneath the ground. Additionally, the volatility of volcanoes and the accompanying earthquakes has been shown to be linked to dike induced stress and the interaction this causes between the magma, rock, and wall of the chamber.

== Importance ==
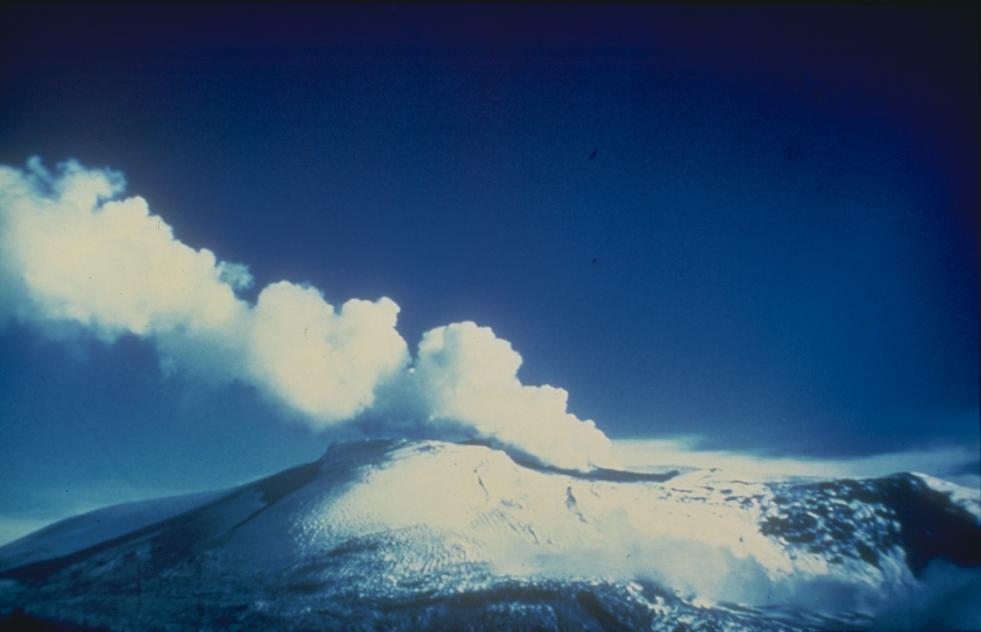
Nevado del Ruiz during the 1985 eruption. This eruption was one where seismic activity was monitored in order to determine that an eruption was imminent.

Volcano tectonic seismicity is an important tool as it may predict the eruptions of volcanoes. Seismic activity occurs as a precursor to most large eruptions. Rarely, because of complex interactions, it may appear to settle just before an eruption. Such tectonic events can predict eruptions in long-dormant volcanoes and the size of the magma pocket. Some notable examples of eruptions preceded by volcano tectonic earthquakes include ones at Nevado del Ruiz (1985), Pinatubo (1991), Unzen (1990), and Cotopaxi (2002). Quakes with volcano-tectonic characteristics accompany magmatic intrusions in near real time.

== Use in monitoring volcanoes ==
Nearly every recorded volcanic eruption has been preceded by some form of earthquake activity beneath or near the volcano. This does not mean that always this activity will give sufficient warning of an eruption. However, for individual volcanoes, the relationship between earthquakes and magma movement or possible eruptions has resulted in approximately 200 of the world's volcanoes being seismically monitored. The recording of several years of background seismic data has allowed classification of volcanic earthquakes. These earthquakes tend to occur in swarms as opposed to mainshock–aftershock sequences, have smaller maximum sizes than tectonic structure earthquakes, have similar waveform patterns, increase in number before eruptions, and occur near or beneath the site of the eruption. Volcano tectonic earthquake seismicity typically originates lateral to the site of the volcanic eruption to come, at tectonic fault structures a few kilometres away. Such earthquakes have a large non-double couple component to their focal mechanism.

Other types of seismic activity monitored in relation to volcanoes and their eruptions are long period seismic waves (caused by sudden sporadic movement of magma that had previously not been moving due to a blockage), and harmonic tremor (indicating steady magma movement).
