= Intermediate composition =

Type of igneous rock

In igneous petrology, an intermediate composition refers to a rock whose chemical composition is intermediate between felsic and mafic compositions, typically containing about 52–63 wt% SiO_{2}. It is not an IUGS recognized term.

Common intermediate volcanic rocks include andesite and trachyandesite, while common intermediate plutonic rocks include diorite and granodiorite.
