= Undersaturation =

State of solution

Undersaturation is a state of a solution that contains less of a dissolved material than could be dissolved by that quantity of solvent under normal circumstances. It can also refer to a vapor of a compound that has a lower (partial) pressure than the compound's vapor pressure. Undersaturation is often followed by ingassing of the solvate until saturation is reached. Most states of solution involve undersaturation.

== See also ==
- Supersaturation
