= Phonolite =

Uncommon extrusive rock

Phonolite Clinkstone
- Extrusive igneous rock
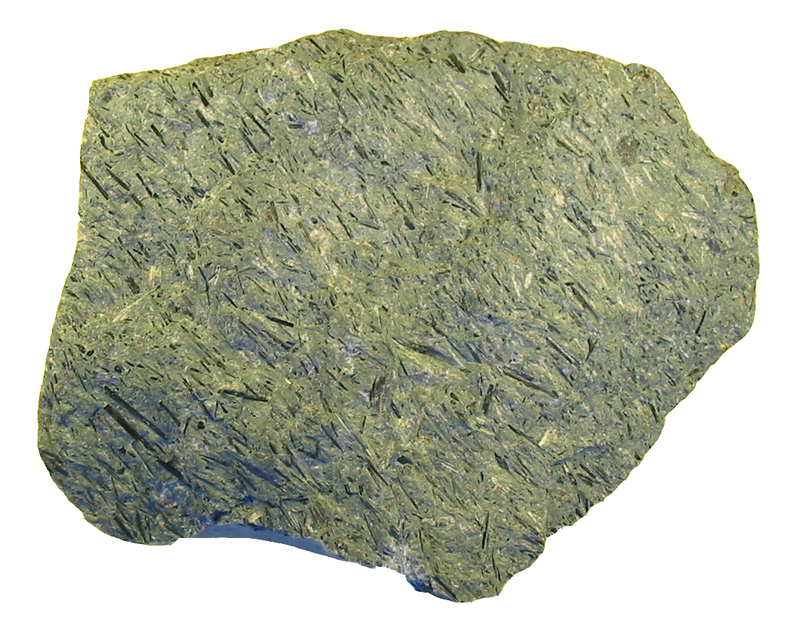
- Dark, prismatic phenocrysts of aegirine in phonolite sample

Composition
- Primary: nepheline, sodalite, hauyne, leucite, analcite, sanidine, anorthoclase
- Secondary: biotite, amphibole, pyroxene, olivine

Demonstration of sound produced when phonolite is struck, Cerro de la Campana (Hermosillo, Sonora, Mexico)

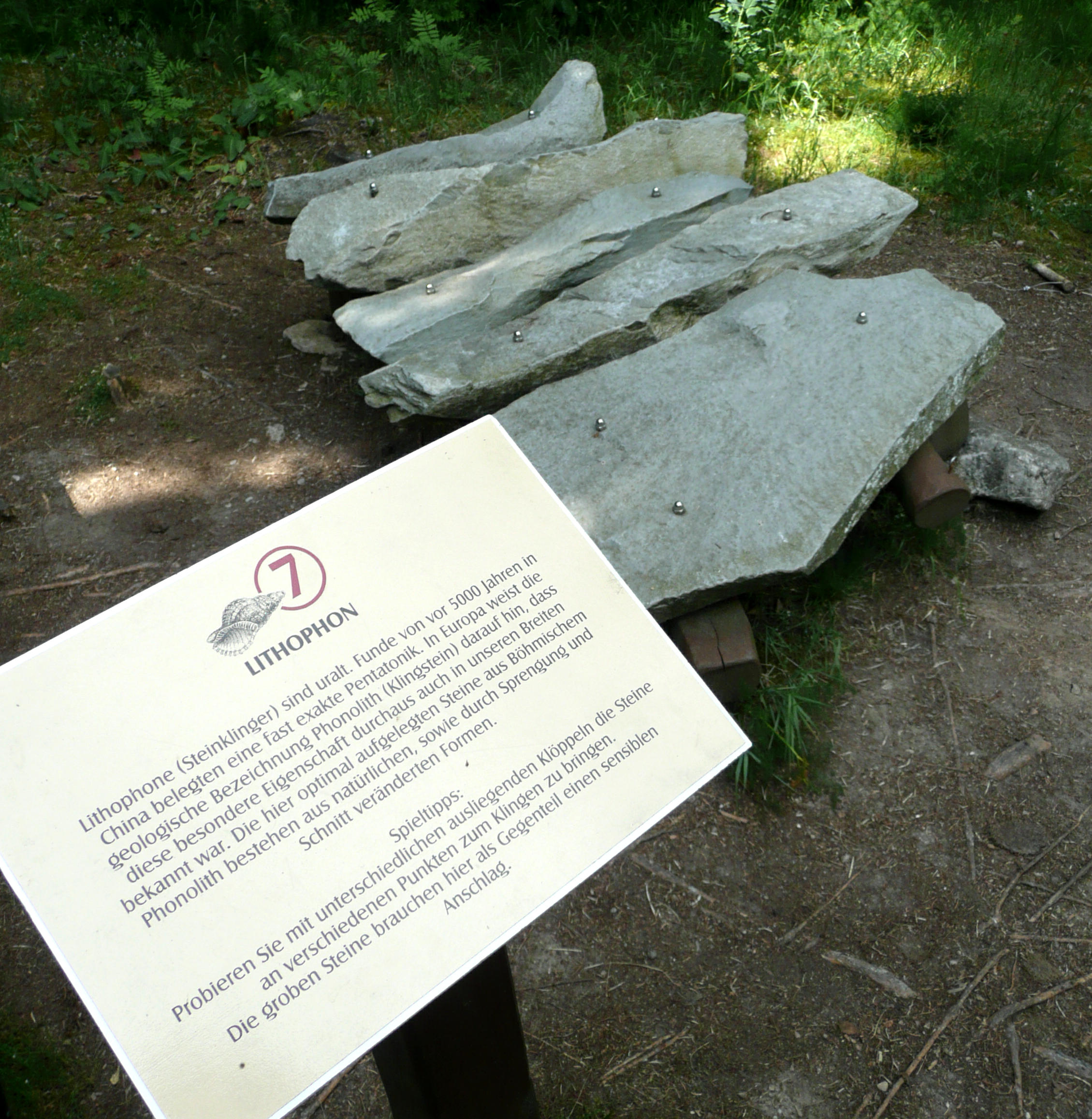
Lithophone made of Phonolite in Schellerhau botanic garden (Germany)

Phonolite is an uncommon shallow intrusive or extrusive rock, of intermediate chemical composition between felsic and mafic, with texture ranging from aphanitic (fine-grained) to porphyritic (mixed fine- and coarse-grained). Phonolite is a variation of the igneous rock trachyte that contains nepheline or leucite rather than quartz. It has an unusually high (12% or more) Na_{2}O + K_{2}O content, defining its position in the TAS classification of igneous rocks. Its coarse grained (phaneritic) intrusive equivalent is nepheline syenite. Phonolite is typically fine grained and compact. The name phonolite comes from the Ancient Greek meaning "sounding stone" due to the metallic sound it produces if an unfractured plate is hit; hence, the English name clinkstone is given as a synonym.

== Formation ==
Unusually, phonolite forms from magma with a relatively low silica content, generated by low degrees of partial melting (less than 10%) of highly aluminous rocks of the lower crust such as tonalite, monzonite and metamorphic rocks. Melting of such rocks to a very low degree promotes the liberation of aluminium, potassium, sodium and calcium by melting of feldspar, with some involvement of mafic minerals. Because the rock is silica-undersaturated, it has no quartz or other silica crystals, and is dominated by low-silica feldspathoid minerals, such as nepheline, more than feldspar minerals. Phonolites typically form under specific conditions of low pressure and relatively high temperatures. The magma from which phonolites crystallize is often enriched in alkali elements, for example sodium and potassium.

A few geological processes and tectonic events can melt the necessary precursor rocks to form phonolite. These include intracontinental hotspot volcanism, such as may form above mantle plumes covered by thick continental crust. A-type granites and alkaline igneous provinces usually occur alongside phonolites. Low-degree partial melting of underplates of granitic material in collisional orogenic belts may also produce phonolites.

== Mineralogy and petrology ==
Total alkali vs. silica classification scheme (TAS), as proposed in Le Maitre's 2002 Igneous Rocks – A classification and glossary of terms

Phonolite is a fine-grained equivalent of nepheline syenite. They are products of partial melting, are silica-undersaturated, and have feldspathoids in their normative mineralogy.

Mineral assemblages in phonolite occurrences are usually abundant feldspathoids (nepheline, sodalite, hauyne, leucite and analcite) and alkali feldspar (sanidine, anorthoclase or orthoclase), and rare sodic plagioclase. Biotite, sodium-rich amphiboles and pyroxenes along with iron-rich olivine are common minor minerals. Accessory phases include titanite, apatite, corundum, zircon, magnetite and ilmenite. Phonolite's characteristic dark color comes from its concentration of dark pyroxenes such as aegirine and augite.

Blairmorite is an analcite-rich variety of phonolite.

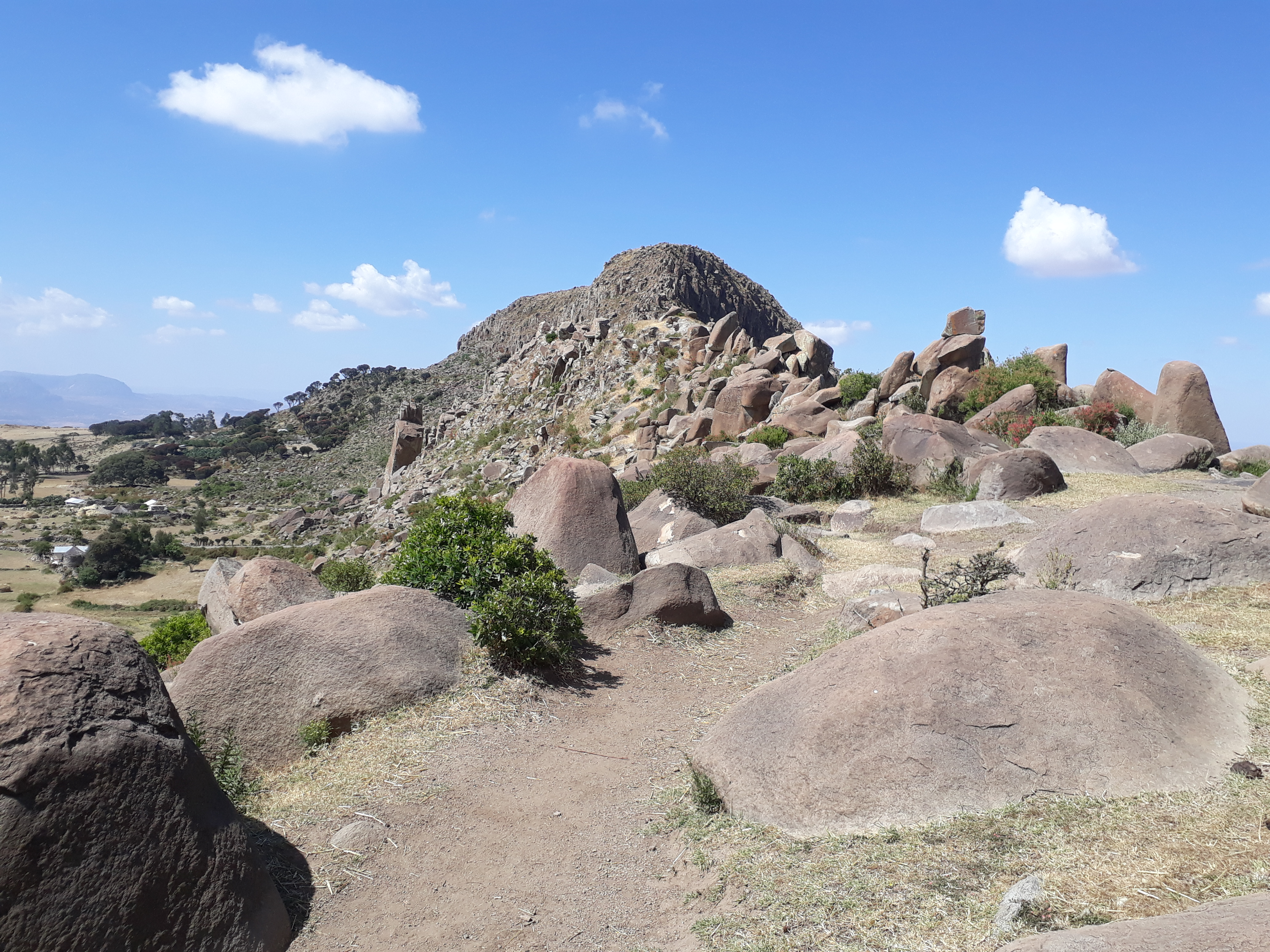
Phonolite dike in Haddinnet in Ethiopia

== Occurrence ==
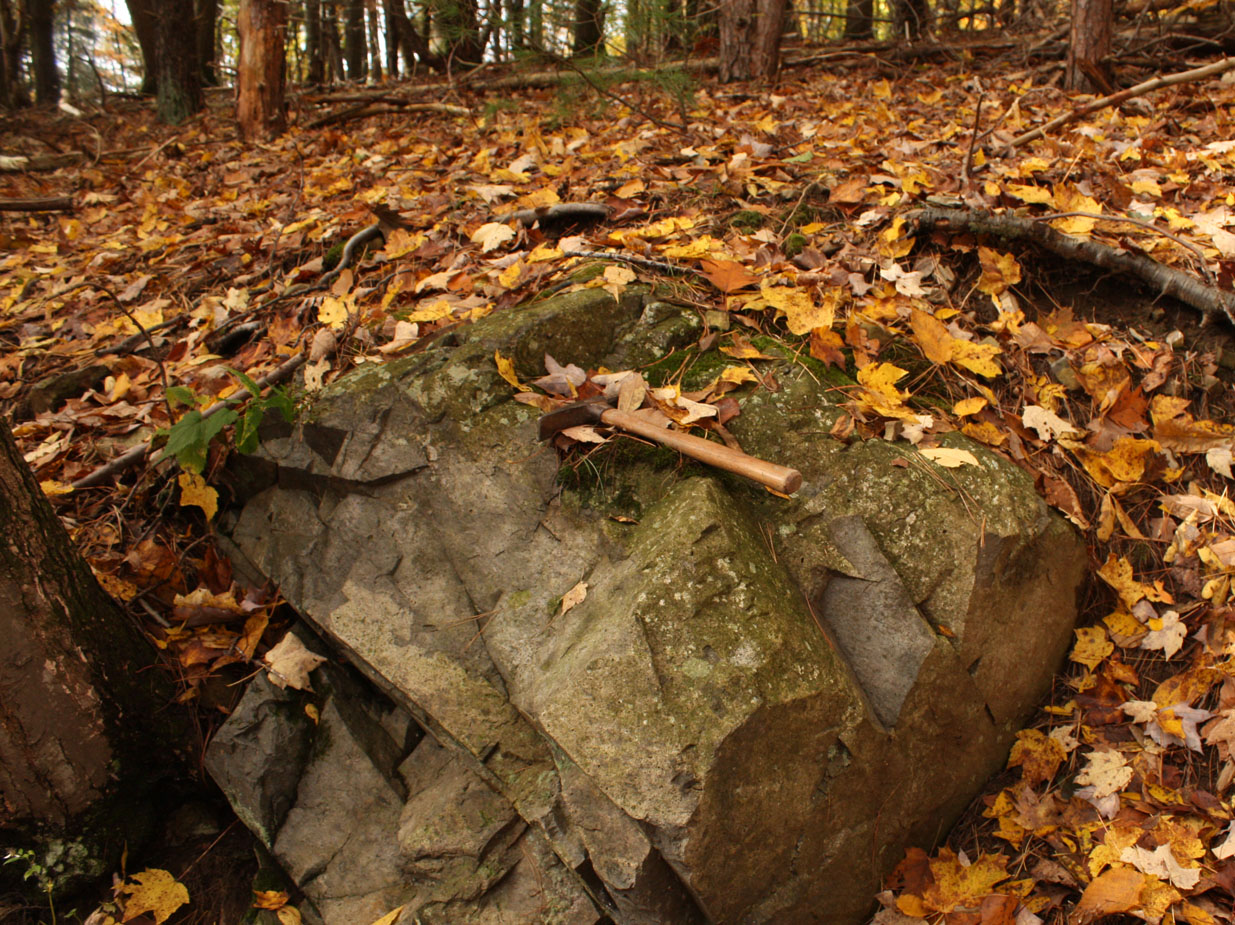
Outcrop of phonolite at Beemerville Complex, New Jersey

Nepheline syenites and phonolites occur widely distributed throughout the world in Canada, Norway, Greenland, Sweden, the United Kingdom, the Ural Mountains, the Pyrenees, Italy, Eifel and Kaiserstuhl in Germany, Brazil, the Transvaal region, the Magnet Cove igneous complex of Arkansas, the Beemerville Complex of New Jersey, as well as on oceanic islands such as the Canary Islands.

Phonolite is common across Europe, particularly within the Eifel Plateau and the Laacher See. It is also found in the Czech Republic and the Mediterranean area near Italy. For localities in the United States, phonolite can be found in the Black Hills Forest in South Dakota. The most well known phonolite-composed natural structure is the Devil's Tower, found in Wyoming.

Nepheline-normative rocks occur in close association with the Bushveld Igneous Complex, possibly formed from partial melting of the wall rocks adjacent to that large ultramafic layered intrusion. Phonolite occurs in the related Pilanesberg Complex and Pienaars River Complex.

=== Examples ===
==== Africa ====
- Cape Verde volcanoes off the coast of Africa in the Atlantic Ocean erupt phonolitic–trachytic lavas.
- Jebel Nefusa, Libya
- Teide, a stratovolcano on the island of Tenerife
- Pico Cão Grande, a needle-shaped volcanic plug peak in São Tomé and Príncipe

==== Europe ====
- Bass Rock, North Berwick Law and Traprain Law in southeast Scotland, UK
- Bořeň, northwestern Czech Republic
- Mont Gerbier de Jonc, Ardèche, France
- Montiferru, Sardinia
- Mount Vesuvius
- Campi Flegrei near Naples, Italy
- Wolf Rock, Cornwall

==== North America ====
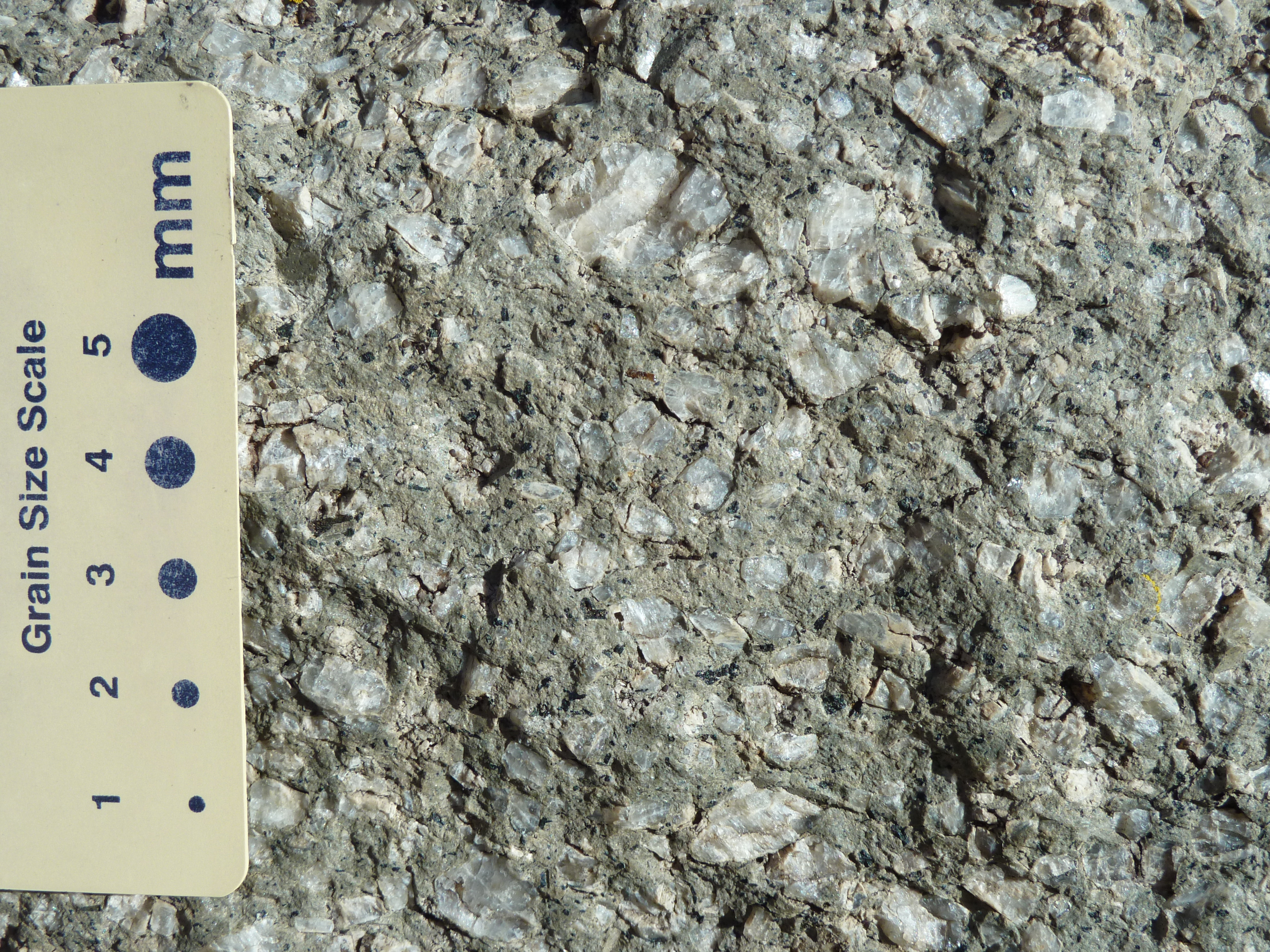
Porphyritic phonolite at Devils Tower

- Cripple Creek & Victor Gold Mine phonolite pipe in Colorado
- Baldface Mountain, west-central British Columbia, Canada
- Devils Tower, Wyoming, United States, an example of columnar-jointed phonolite
- Hoodoo Mountain, northwestern British Columbia, Canada
- Missouri Buttes, Crook County, northeast Wyoming, United States

==== Other ====
- Mount Cargill, Dunedin, New Zealand
- The phonolitic lava lake in Mount Erebus, Ross Island, Antarctica
- The 'Bellstone' in Saint Helena

== Economic importance ==
Phonolites can be of interest as dimension stone or as aggregate for gravels.

Rarely, economically mineralised phonolite-nepheline syenite alkaline complexes can be associated with rare-earth mineralisation, uranium mineralisation and phosphates, such as at Phalaborwa, South Africa.

Phonolite tuff was used as a source of flint for adze heads and such by prehistoric people from Hohentwiel and Hegau, Germany.

Phonolites can be separated into slabs of appropriate dimensions to be used as roofing tiles in place of roofing slate. One such occurrence is in the French Massif Central region such as the Haute Loire département.
