= Volcanic belt =

Large volcanically active region

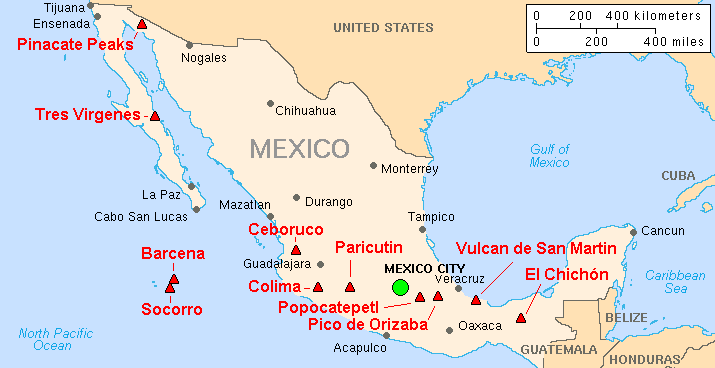
The Trans-Mexican Volcanic Belt in Mexico

A volcanic belt is a large volcanically active region. Other terms are used for smaller areas of activity, such as volcanic fields or volcanic systems. Volcanic belts are found above zones of unusually high temperature (700 to 1,400 °C (1,292 to 2,552 °F)) where magma is created by partial melting of solid material in the Earth's crust and upper mantle. These areas usually form along tectonic plate boundaries at depths of 10 to 50 kilometres (6.2 to 31.1 mi). For example, volcanoes in Mexico and western North America are mostly in volcanic belts, such as the Trans-Mexican Volcanic Belt that extends 900 kilometres (560 mi) from west to east across central-southern Mexico and the Northern Cordilleran Volcanic Province in western Canada. In the case of Iceland, the geologist G.G. Bárdarson in 1929 identified clusters of volcanic belts while studying the Reykjanes Peninsula.

The deeply deformed and eroded remnants of ancient volcanic belts are found in volcanically inactive regions such as the Canadian Shield. It contains over 150 volcanic belts (now deformed and eroded down to nearly flat plains) that range from 600 to 1,200 million years old. These are zones of variably metamorphosed mafic to ultramafic volcanic sequences with associated sedimentary rocks that form what are known as greenstone belts. They are thought to have formed at ancient oceanic spreading centers and island arc terranes. The Abitibi greenstone belt in Ontario and Quebec, Canada is one of the world's largest greenstone belts.

Volcanic belts are similar to a mountain range, but the mountains within the mountain range are volcanoes, not mountains that are formed by faulting and folding by the collision of tectonic plates.

== Formation ==
Volcanic belts may be formed by multiple tectonic settings. They may be formed by subduction zones, which is an area on Earth where two tectonic plates meet and move towards one another, with one sliding underneath the other and moving down into the mantle, at rates typically measured in centimeters per year. An oceanic plate ordinarily slides underneath a continental plate; this often creates an orogenic zone with many volcanoes and earthquakes. In a sense, subduction zones are the opposite of divergent boundaries, areas where material rises up from the mantle and plates are moving apart. An example of a subduction-zone related volcanic belt is the Okhotsk-Chukotka Volcanic Belt in northeastern Eurasia, which is one of the largest subduction-zone related volcanic provinces in the world, stretching some 3,200 kilometres (2,000 mi) and comprising about 2×10^{6} cubic kilometres (4.8×10^{5} cu mi) of volcanic and plutonic material.

The Anahim Volcanic Belt in British Columbia, Canada

Volcanic belts may also be formed by hotspots, which is a location on the Earth's surface that has experienced active volcanism for a long period of time. These volcanic belts are called volcanic chains. Canadian geologist John Tuzo Wilson came up with the idea in 1963 that volcanic chains like the Hawaiian Islands result from the slow movement of a tectonic plate across a "fixed" hot spot deep beneath the surface of the planet, thought to be caused by a narrow stream of hot mantle convecting up from the mantle-core boundary called a mantle plume. But more recently some geologists, such as Gillian Foulger view upper-mantle convection as a cause. This in turn has re-raised the antipodal pair impact hypothesis, the idea that pairs of opposite hot spots may result from the impact of a large meteor. Geologists have identified some 40-50 such hotspots around the globe, with Hawaii, Réunion, Yellowstone, Galápagos, and Iceland overlying the most currently active. An example of a hotspot volcanic belt is the Anahim Volcanic Belt in British Columbia, Canada, which was formed as a result of the North American Plate sliding westward over the Anahim hotspot.

Most hotspot volcanoes are basaltic because they erupt through oceanic lithosphere (e.g., Hawaii, Tahiti). As a result, they are less explosive than subduction zone volcanoes, which have high water contents. Where hotspots occur under continental crust, basaltic magma is trapped in the less dense continental crust, which is heated and melts to form rhyolites. These rhyolites can be quite hot and form violent eruptions, despite their low water content. For example, the Yellowstone Caldera was formed by some of the most powerful volcanic explosions in geologic history.

== Examples ==
- Andean Volcanic Belt
- Garibaldi Volcanic Belt
- Taupō Volcanic Zone
- Trans-Mexican Volcanic Belt

== See also ==
- Hotspot
- Pacific Ring of Fire
- Plate tectonics
- Volcanic arc
- Volcanic field
