= Itcha Mountain =

Mountain in British Columbia, Canada

- Location within British Columbia

Highest point
- Elevation: 2,290 m (7,510 ft)
- Prominence: 180 m (590 ft)
- Coordinates: 52°43′03.0″N 124°49′49.1″W

Naming
- Native name: ʔAchax Dẑelh (Chilcotin)

Geography
- Location: Chilcotin District, British Columbia, Canada
- District: Range 3 Coast Land District
- Parent range: Itcha Range
- Topo map: NTS 93C10 Downton Creek

Geology
- Mountain type: Cinder cone

Itcha Mountain is one of the two named volcanic peaks of the Itcha Range, which is located in the Chilcotin District of the Central Interior of British Columbia, Canada. It is in the Anahim Volcanic Belt, which formed when the North American Plate moved over a hotspot, similar to the one feeding the Hawaiian Islands. The Anahim Volcanic Belt includes other immediately nearby ranges, the Rainbow and Ilgachuz Ranges. Itcha Mountain is located 42 km (26 mi) northeast of Anahim Lake and 2 km (1 mi) northeast of Mount Downton, another peak of the Itcha Range. Both of these peaks are located within Itcha Ilgachuz Provincial Park, as is Far Mountain, the park's highest peak.

This mountain is the namesake for the Itcha Range, which is one of the several large shield volcanoes that stands all by itself.

== See also ==
- List of volcanoes in Canada
- Volcanism of Canada
- Volcanism of Western Canada
- Itcha Range
- Ilgachuz Range
- Rainbow Range
- Anahim Volcanic Belt
