= Itcha =

Itcha may refer to:

Philosophical and religious concepts

- Itcha shakti

Places

- Itcha Ilgachuz Provincial Park
- Itcha Lake
- Itcha Mountain
- Itcha Range
