= Tsitsutl Peak =

Mountain in British Columbia, Canada

- Location within British Columbia

Highest point
- Elevation: 2,495 m (8,186 ft)
- Prominence: 1,185 m (3,888 ft)
- Listing: Mountains of British Columbia
- Coordinates: 52°43′24″N 125°46′48″W

Geography
- Country: Canada
- Province: British Columbia
- District: Range 3 Coast Land District
- Protected area: Tweedsmuir South Provincial Park
- Parent range: Rainbow Range
- Topo map: NTS 93C12 Tusulko River

Geology
- Volcanic belt: Anahim Volcanic Belt

Tsitsutl Peak is the highest volcanic peak of the Rainbow Range in British Columbia, Canada, located within Tweedsmuir South Provincial Park, 43 km (27 mi) northwest of Anahim Lake and 44 km (27 mi) northeast of Thunder Mountain.

== Name origin ==
"Tsitsutl" means "painted mountains" in the local native language, and is a reference to the Rainbow Range in general. "

== See also ==
- Ilgachuz Range
- Itcha Range
- Anahim Volcanic Belt
- List of volcanoes in Canada
- Anahim hotspot
