= Mount Downton =

Mountain in British Columbia, Canada

- Location within British Columbia
- Interactive map of Mount Downton

Highest point
- Elevation: 2,375 m (7,792 ft)
- Prominence: 785 m (2,575 ft)
- Coordinates: 52°42′21″N 124°51′03″W

Geography
- Location: British Columbia, Canada
- District: Range 3 Coast Land District
- Parent range: Itcha Range
- Topo map: NTS 93C10 Downton Creek

Geology
- Last eruption: Pleistocene

Mount Downton is the highest summit of the 10 km (6 mi) diameter Itcha Range, located 40 km (25 mi) northeast of Anahim Lake and 33 km (21 mi) east of Far Mountain in the Chilcotin District of the Central Interior of British Columbia, Canada. It lies within Itcha Ilgachuz Provincial Park.

== Name origin ==
Mount Downton was named for Geoffrey M. Downton, British Columbia Land Surveyor, for whom Downton Lake, the reservoir behind Lajoie Dam in the Bridge River Power Project is also named. Downton is credited with first noting the hydroelectric potential inherent in the elevation differential between the Bridge River and Seton Lake on opposing sides of Mission Pass during a visit to the Bridge River Mining District in 1912.

== Geology ==
Mount Downton is part of the Anahim Volcanic Belt, a west–east trending line of volcanoes formed when the North American Plate moved over a hotspot, similar to the one feeding the Hawaiian Islands, called the Anahim hotspot. The Anahim Volcanic Belt includes other immediately nearby ranges, the Rainbow and Ilgachuz Ranges.

== See also ==
- Ilgachuz Range
- Rainbow Range
- Anahim Volcanic Belt
- Anahim hotspot
- List of volcanoes in Canada
- Volcanism of Western Canada
