= Tweedsmuir Park =

Tweedsmuir Park may refer to:

- Tweedsmuir North Provincial Park and Protected Area
- Tweedsmuir South Provincial Park
