= Far Mountain =

Mountain in British Columbia, Canada

- Location within British Columbia
- Interactive map of Far Mountain

Highest point
- Elevation: 2,410 m (7,910 ft)
- Prominence: 1,230 m (4,040 ft)
- Coordinates: 52°47′12.1″N 125°19′23.9″W

Geography
- Location: British Columbia, Canada
- District: Range 3 Coast Land District
- Parent range: Ilgachuz Range
- Topo map: NTS 93C14 Carnlick Creek

Geology
- Volcanic belt: Anahim Volcanic Belt

Far Mountain is the highest of over 13 peaks in the Ilgachuz Range in the Anahim Volcanic Belt in British Columbia, Canada. The Ilgachuz Range is one of the three major shield volcanoes that formed the Anahim Volcanic Belt when the North American Plate moved over a hotspot (the Anahim hotspot). This is similar to the one which feeds the Hawaiian Islands. The mountain is located in the western part of Itcha Ilgachuz Provincial Park.

== See also ==
- Ilgachuz Range
- Rainbow Range
- Itcha Range
- Anahim hotspot
- List of volcanoes in Canada
- Anahim Volcanic Belt
- Volcanism in Canada
- Volcanism in Western Canada
