= Downton Creek (Chilcotin Plateau) =

Stream in British Columbia, Canada

Coordinates: 52°36′37″N 124°31′24″W

Downton Creek is a stream in the West-Central Interior of British Columbia, Canada that flows from Mount Downton in the Itcha Range due southeast to the Chilcotin River.
