= Nimpo Lake =

Lake in British Columbia, Canada

- Ts’elhʔas (Chilcotin)
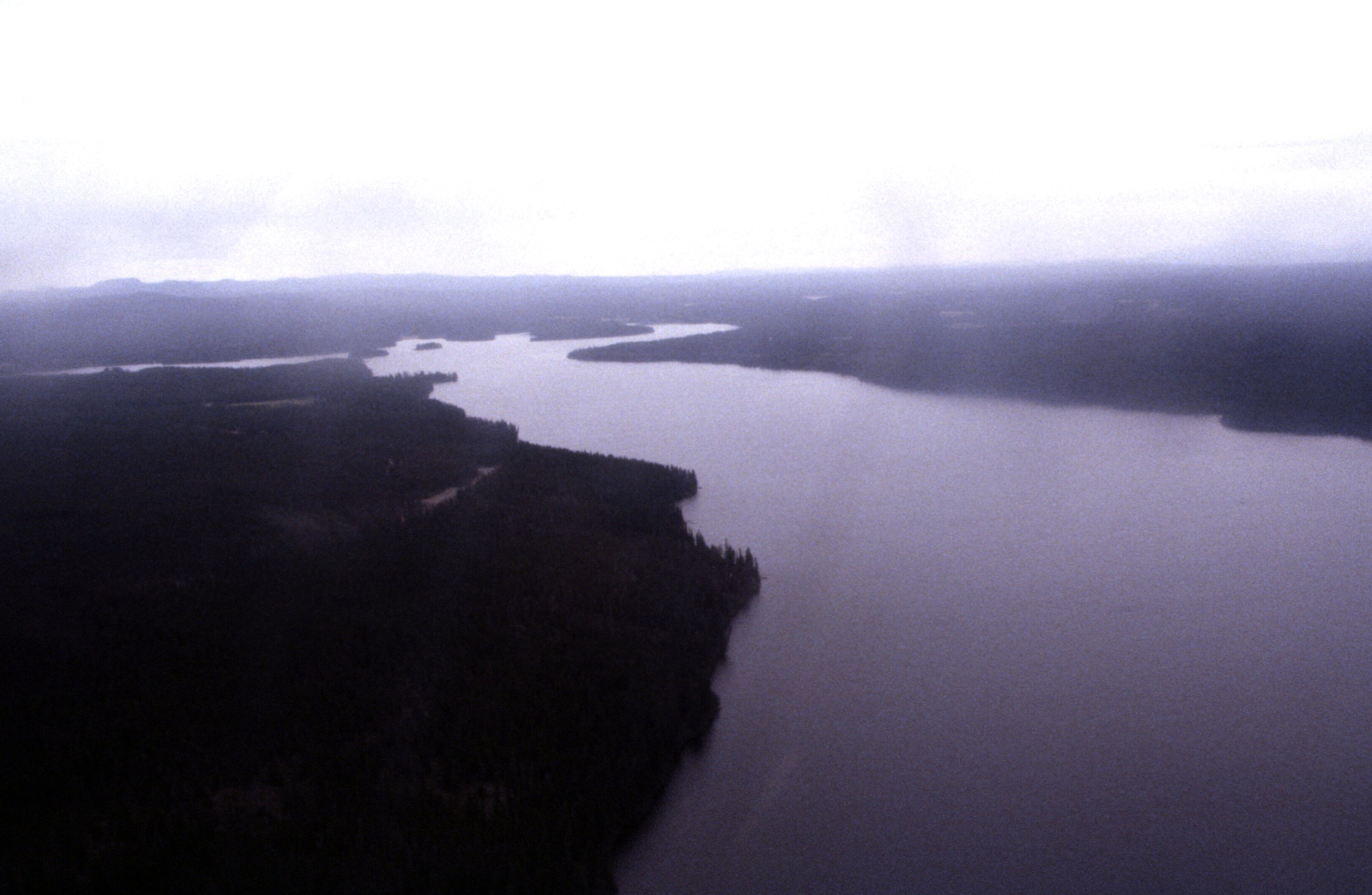
- Nimpo Lake (picture taken from a floatplane)

- Location within British Columbia
- Location: British Columbia
- Coordinates: 52°19′59″N 125°10′39″W
- Primary inflows: Willie's Creek, Dean River, Nimpo Creek
- Primary outflows: Dean River
- Basin countries: Canada
- Max. length: 7 mi (11 km)
- Max. width: 1 mi (1.6 km)
- Surface area: 9.88 km^{2} (3.81 sq mi)
- Average depth: 30–40 ft (9.1–12.2 m)
- Max. depth: 90 ft (27 m)
- Surface elevation: 3,655 ft (1,114 m)
- Islands: 3

Nimpo Lake is a freshwater lake in the Chilcotin District of British Columbia, Canada. It is located 300 kilometres (190 miles) west of Williams Lake on the Chilcotin Highway (Hwy 20) and is approximately 160 kilometres (99 miles) east of Bella Coola. The lake is over 11 kilometres (6.8 miles) long with several protected bays and has an area of 9.88 km^{2}.

== Floatplanes ==
Nimpo Lake is often referred to as "The Floatplane Capital of British Columbia" and, because it has so many floatplanes landing and taking off, each of the bays or 'arms' have a distinctive name. North Arm is at the extreme northernmost end of the Main Arm of Nimpo Lake while the South Arm is at the other end and the Short Arm is on the eastern side of the lake where a floatplane base is located.

== Fishing ==
Nimpo Lake has a good population of wild rainbow trout that are known for their excellent fighting ability and are caught by trolling and on a flyline. Its popularity with anglers fishing for rainbow trout, made it the venue of the 1993 Commonwealth Fly Fishing Championships. It is a popular tourist destination, with several resorts located on the lake offering a variation of accommodation ranging from luxurious suites to rustic cabins and sites for Recreational vehicles.

== Leisure activities ==
Nimpo Lake is the jumping off point to the wilderness, much of it inaccessible to people except by floatplane or on foot. You can go flightseeing over Hunlen Falls, the third longest freefalling waterfall in Canada, or fly over the multicolored Rainbow Mountains or Monarch Mountain and see the pristine icefields. There is canoeing on the Turner Lake Chain in nearby Tweedsmuir Park, and a number of activities available to visitors of the area. These include fishing, hiking, mountain biking, canoeing, kayaking, hunting, wildlife photography and study of rare and unusual alpine plants at higher elevations. In winter snowmobiling, cross country skiing, snowshoeing and ice skating are popular activities.

== See also ==
- List of lakes of British Columbia
