= Mount MacKenzie =

Mountain in British Columbia, Canada

- Location within British Columbia
- Interactive map of Mount MacKenzie

Highest point
- Elevation: 2,143 m (7,031 ft)
- Prominence: 378 m (1,240 ft)
- Listing: List of volcanoes in Canada
- Coordinates: 52°37′00.1″N 126°05′31.9″W

Geography
- Location: British Columbia, Canada
- District: Range 3 Coast Land District
- Parent range: Rainbow Range
- Topo map: NTS 93D9 Tahyesco River

Geology
- Volcanic belt: Anahim Volcanic Belt

Mount MacKenzie is a volcanic peak, located 40 km (25 mi) northeast of Hagensborg, British Columbia, Canada. It is one of the volcanic peaks of the Rainbow Range, which is one of the three major shield volcanoes that form the Anahim Volcanic Belt. Mount MacKenzie was formed when the North American Plate moved over a hotspot, similar to the one feeding the Hawaiian Islands, known as the Anahim hotspot.

== See also ==
- List of volcanoes in Canada
- Volcanology of Canada
- Volcanology of Western Canada
