= Tweedsmuir North Provincial Park and Protected Area =

Provincial park in British Columbia

Tweedsmuir North Provincial Park
- IUCN category II (national park)
- Location within British Columbia
- Interactive map of Tweedsmuir North Provincial Park
- Location: Bulkley-Nechako, British Columbia, Canada
- Nearest city: Prince George
- Coordinates: 53.34295°N 126.46567°W
- Area: 446,107 ha (1,722.43 sq mi)
- Established: May 21, 1938
- Governing body: BC Parks
- Website: Tweedsmuir Provincial Park - North

Tweedsmuir North Provincial Park and Protected Area is a provincial park in British Columbia, Canada, which along with Tweedsmuir South Provincial Park and Entiako Provincial Park were once part of Tweedsmuir Provincial Park, then B. C.'s largest park, 9,810 square kilometres (3,790 sq mi) located in the Coast Range.

== History ==
Tweedsmuir gained park status in 1938 as the earliest large park established under the BC Parks protected areas system. Tweedsmuir North Provincial Park and Protected Area was re-designated a park and protected area as the latter classification allows resource extraction and other economic activities not permitted in full park designations. Entiako Provincial Park and Protected Area is located on the south flank of the Nechako River watercourse.

== Geography ==
The northern portion of the park is a wilderness area. Access is possible via boat, using Ootsa and Whitesail Lakes. The Park is between Burns Lake and Houston. BC Parks provides this explanation: "To get from Chikamin Bay on Whitesail Lake to St. Thomas Bay on Eutsuk Lake in Tweedsmuir Provincial Park, boaters are required to winch their boats over a 600 metre rail portage. Boats to about 7 metres in length can be portaged." Two other common access points are recommended, and maps are provided on the BC Parks web site: Little Andrews Bay Provincial Park and Wistaria Provincial Park. Burns Lake, B.C. is considered to be the northern gateway for fly-in tours for sightseeing, hunting and fishing; these are offered by local outfitters in the town.

== Ecology ==
The park is considered to be an almost pristine mountain wilderness. There are many kinds of large mammals in the park including grizzly bears, black bears, wolves, mountain lions, wolverines, boreal woodland caribou, moose, mountain goats and hoary marmots.

The Tweedsmuir-Entiako woodland caribou herd numbered about 500 caribou in 1993. Their range extends to throughout northern Tweedsmuir Park in alpine and forested habitat in the summer and to the mouth of the Entiako River where the migrates in late winter. By the early 1990s the herd was already declining. Research was undertaken to manage the herd as logging activities were proposed in the area near their winter range. In southern and central B.C. most of the caribou herds "had significantly declined in numbers and in range". By 1985 Stevenson and Hatler had designated the maintenance of Tweedsmuir-Entiako caribou winter range in the land management report as high priority.
