= Festuca Pass =

Mountain pass in British Columbia, Canada

- Location within British Columbia
- Elevation: 1,795 metres (5,889 ft)

Third Approach
- Location: Chilcotin Plateau, British Columbia, Canada
- Range: Ilgachuz Range
- Coordinates: 52°45′18″N 125°18′52″W
- Topo map: NTS 93C14 Carnlick Creek

Festuca Pass is a mountain pass through the Ilgachuz Range in the West-Central Interior of British Columbia, Canada. Located in a valley west of Carnlick Creek between Calliope Mountain and Pipe Organ Mountain, Festuca Pass is the only named pass in the Ilgachuz Range. It was named by Roy Taylor of UBC Botanical Gardens after Festuca altaica, a grass species that is present in the pass.
