= Manda-Inakir =

Manda-Inakir ماندا-إناكير
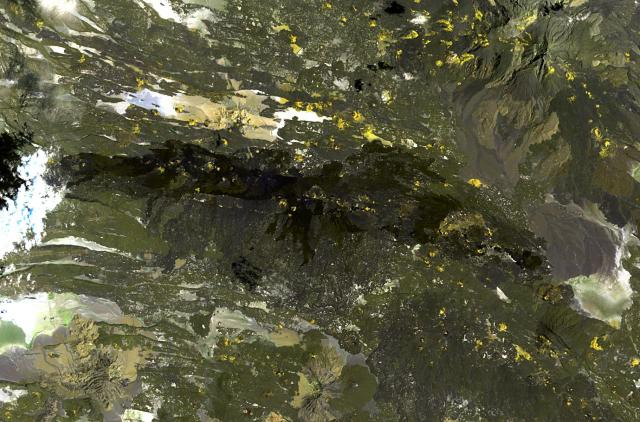
- Manda-Inakir lava flows

Highest point
- Elevation: 600+ metres (1,968 feet)
- Coordinates: 12°38′N 42°20′E

Geography
- Location: Djibouti, Eritrea and Ethiopia

Geology
- Rock age: Historical
- Mountain type: Fissure vents
- Last eruption: 1928

Manda-Inakir (Arabic: ماندا-إناكير) is a system of fissure vents and cinder cones located along the borders between Djibouti, Eritrea and Ethiopia. Last erupting in 1928, it produced a cinder cone called Kammourta. It has an elevation of over 600 metres.

== See also ==
- Emba Soira
