= Titan Ridge Volcano =

Undersea volcano in Papua New Guinea

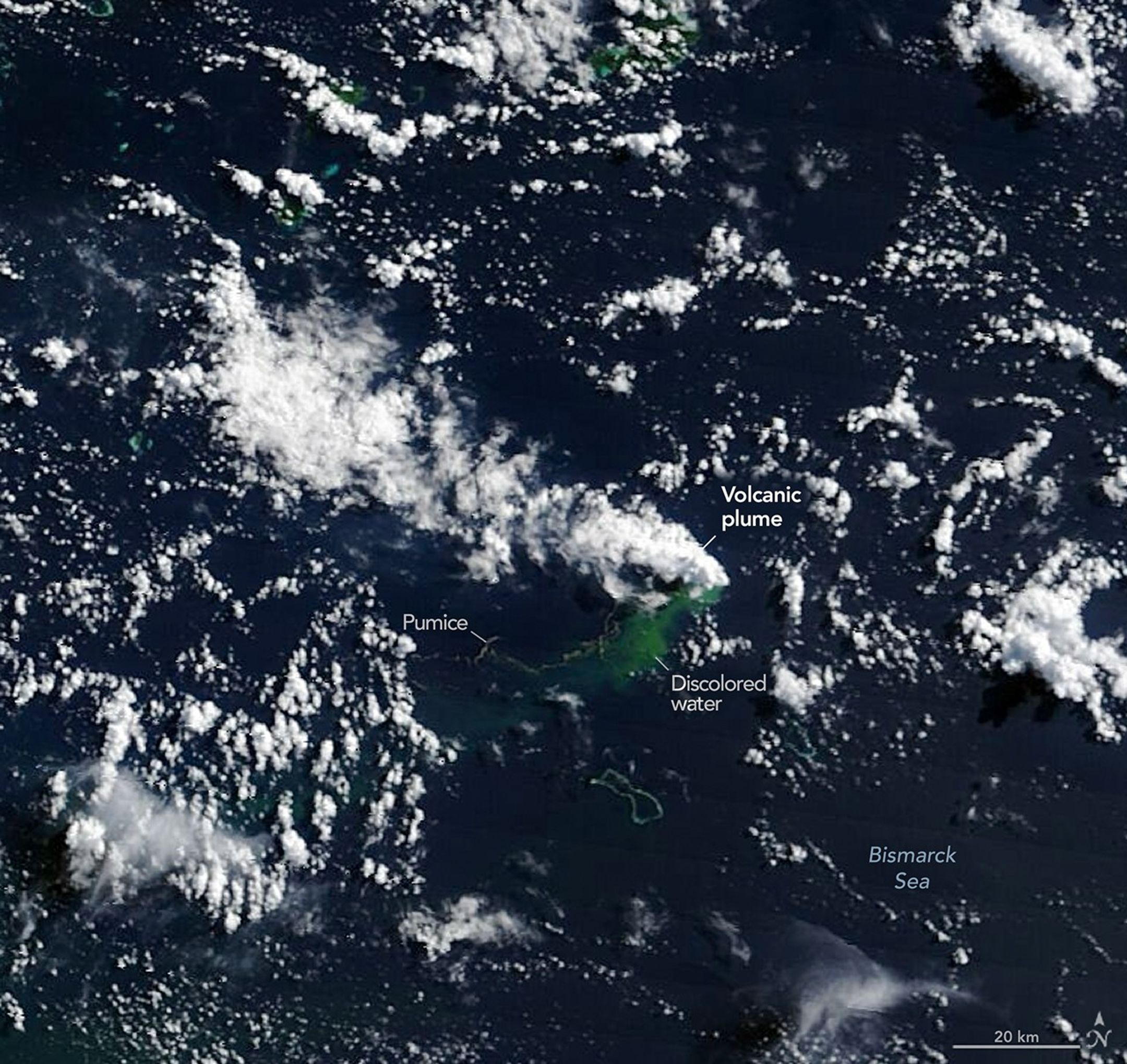
- The volcano erupting on 15 May 2026

Highest point
- Elevation: –1,300 m
- Coordinates: 3°02′S 147°47′E

Geography
- Location: Bismarck Sea, Papua New Guinea

Geology
- Mountain type(s): Submarine volcano; fissure vent
- Volcanic zone: Bismarck Sea Volcanic Province
- Last eruption: 2026 (ongoing)

The Titan Ridge Volcano, also known as the Central Bismarck Sea Volcano, is an active submarine volcano in the Bismarck Sea. It is located 125 kilometres (78 mi) southeast of Manus Island, Papua New Guinea, on the northern edge of the South Bismarck plate. It has two recorded eruptions: one minor in 1972, and one larger in 2026. It was provisionally named in May 2026 following a proposal from local residents. Folklore of the Titan people, who live on Manus Island, tells that their original home island was devastated and reduced to a reef.

== Geography and geology ==
The Titan Ridge Volcano is located about 125 kilometres (78 mi) southeast of Manus Island, Papua New Guinea, in the Bismarck Sea. The tectonics of the Bismarck Sea's seafloor are complex, with rifts, scarps, and active subduction. The volcanic vent of the 2026 eruption is thought to be occurring on the Titan Ridge. The volcano is located on the northern edge of the South Bismarck plate, near the junction of the Willaumez transform fault and a back-arc spreading ridge. It is part of the Bismarck Sea Volcanic Province.

== Eruptive history ==
A small submarine eruption began on 8 January 1972. Eruptive activity was detected on 8, 9, and 12 January by underwater hydrophone stations at Manus Island and at Wake and Midway Island in the central Pacific.

=== 2026 eruption ===
Earthquakes were recorded at the volcano on 31 March and 25 April 2026. A swarm of seismic activity likely indicated the beginning of an eruption by 01:10 UTC on 8 May. The new eruption is 16 kilometres (9.9 mi) southeast from the site of the 1972 eruption. Plumes of steam and volcanic gasses rising 3 kilometres (1.9 mi) high were visible in satellite imagery on 9–12 May. By 15 May, two separate vents spaced 2.5 kilometres (1.6 mi) were producing plumes. The eruption's intensity appeared to decline slightly by 25 May, producing less vigorous plumes. The eruption discoloured the water and produced thick pumice rafts, which extended up to 200 kilometres (120 mi) from the volcano. Thermal anomalies detected by satellite and the presence of pumice at the surface suggest the eruption vent is near the sea surface. Prior bathymetry of the area shows a depth of 500–800 metres (1,600–2,600 ft). The characteristics of the erupting vent—such as its original depth and whether it has erupted before—are currently unclear.

The eruption raised concerns over tsunami risk. Local fishermen reported floating dead fish and sounds of deep rumbling near the volcano. Aircraft and ships were advised to avoid the area. Pumice rafts washed ashore on the Admiralty Islands in Manus Province, disrupting local sea travel upon which the region is reliant on for trade, fishing, and access to food and medical services. A large pumice raft in Loniu passage is threatening sea access to Lorengau, the main town on Manus Island. Former Manus MP Ron Knight stated that the pumice rafts have begun to damage local ecosystems Manusians are reliant on, killing fish, coral, and seagrass. By early July, the pumice rafts had broken up and dispersed.
