= Hertali =

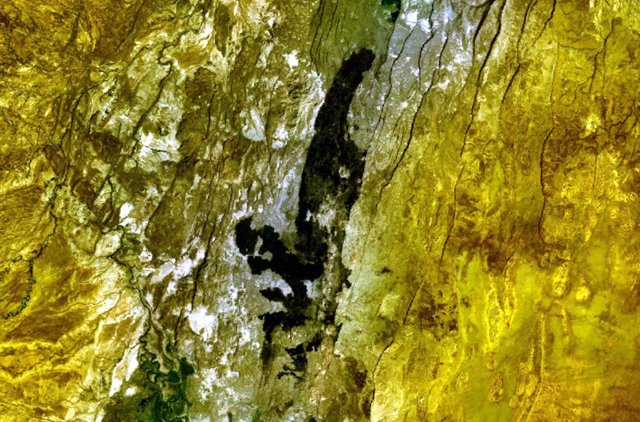
- The dark-colored area cutting across the center of this NASA Landsat image (with north to the top) is a series of basaltic lava flows erupted from fissure vents at Hertali. These flows lie at the south end of the Awash Plain, about 50 km NNE of Dofen volcano. The youthful morphology of the flows suggest a late Pleistocene to Holocene age. Numerous NNE-SSW-trending fissures of the Ethiopian Rift prominently cut across both sides of the rift.

Highest point
- Coordinates: 9.78°N 40.33°E

Geography
- Location: Ethiopia

Geology
- Rock age: Holocene
- Mountain type: Fissure vent
- Last eruption: Unknown

Hertali is a fissure vent in Ethiopia, part of the East African Rift system. The fissure vent is believed to have been active from the late Pleistocene into the Holocene.
