= Itcha Lake =

Lake in British Columbia, Canada

Coordinates: 52°47′11″N 124°45′44″W

- Location within British Columbia
- Location: Chilcotin District, British Columbia
- Primary outflows: Chilcotin River
- Basin countries: Canada
- Surface elevation: 1,594 m (5,230 ft)
- Settlements: None

Itcha Lake is a lake in the Chilcotin District of the Central Interior of British Columbia, Canada. It is located northwest of Chilcotin Lake near the northeastern end of the Itcha Range in Itcha Ilgachuz Provincial Park.

Itcha Lake supports populations of rainbow trout and bull trout, the latter of which is a blue-listed species. It is also the source of the Chilcotin River, which flows southeast into the Fraser River south of Williams Lake.
