= Entiako Provincial Park =

Canadian provincial park

- IUCN category II (national park)
- Location within British Columbia
- Interactive map of Entiako Provincial Park
- Location: Bulkley-Nechako, British Columbia, Canada
- Nearest city: Prince George
- Coordinates: 53°15′00″N 125°26′00″W
- Area: 126,023 ha (486.58 sq mi)
- Established: 29 June 1999
- Governing body: BC Parks

Entiako Provincial Park is a provincial park in British Columbia, Canada, located on the south flank of the Nechako River watercourse.

== History ==
In 1956, the boundaries of Tweedsmuir Provincial Park were revised so that the area of what is now Entiako Provincial Park could be opened up for resource extraction.

In 1991, the province initiated the Entiako Land and Resource Use Plan in order to address conflict between forestry interests and the need to preserve critical winter habitat for caribou. After 2 years, management of the area was taken on by the newly initiated Vanderhoof Land and Resource Management Plan (LRMP) and the Lakes Land and Resource Management Plan (LRMP).

About 48,261 hectares of land under the Vanderhoof LRMP was designated a Class A Park in 1999, while about 73,268 hectares of land under the Lakes LRMP was designated a protected area in 2001 pending finalization of an ecosystem management plan.
