= Hump Mountain =

Mountain in West Virginia, United States

Coordinates: 37°48′48″N 80°52′40″W

Hump Mountain is a summit in West Virginia, in the United States. With an elevation of 3,245 feet (989 m), Hump Mountain is the 263rd highest summit in the state of West Virginia.

Hump Mountain was so named on account of its outline being in the form of a hump.
