= Hunlen Falls =

Waterfall in British Columbia, Canada

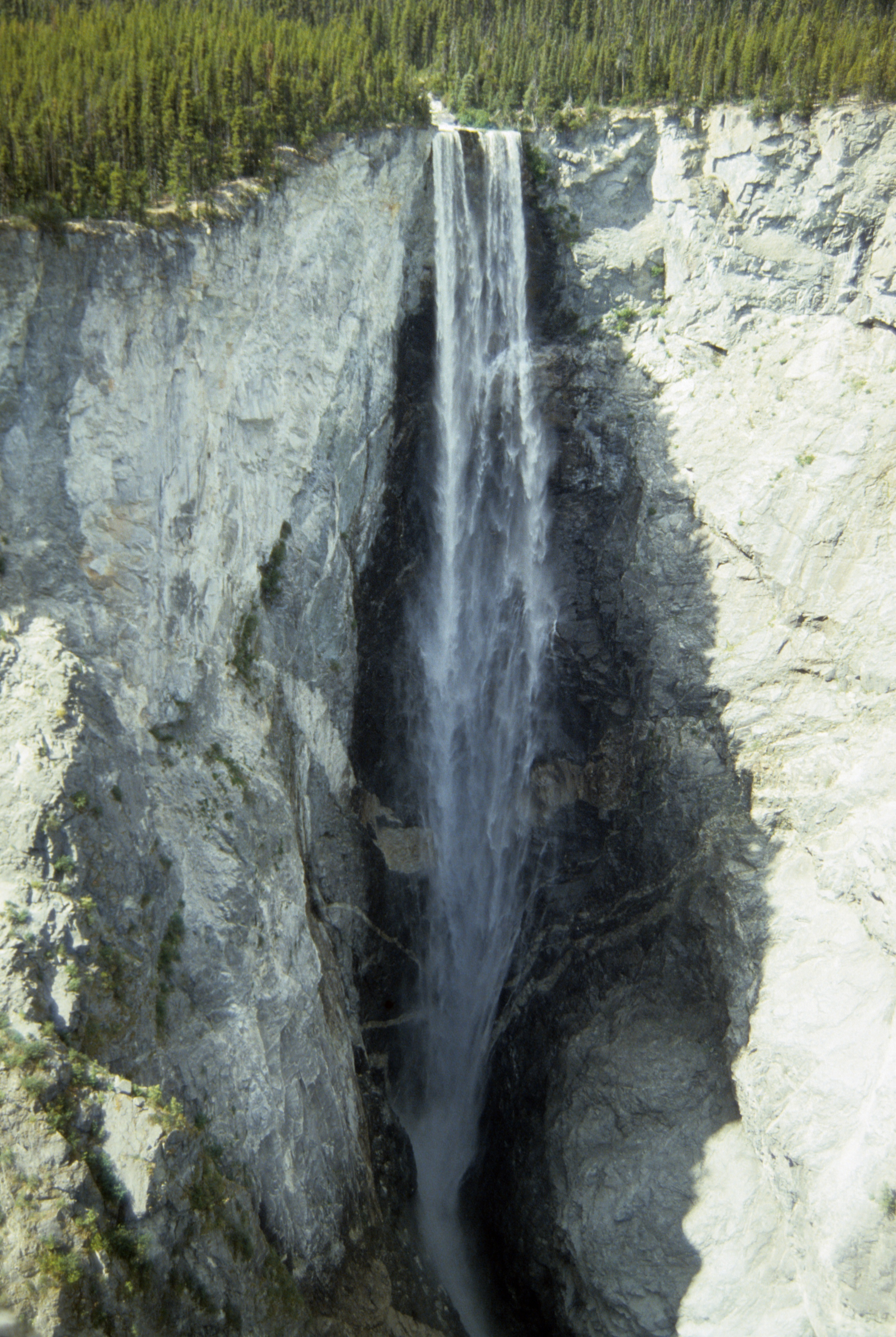
- Interactive map of Hunlen Falls
- Location: Tweedsmuir South Provincial Park, British Columbia, Canada
- Coordinates: 52°16′36″N 125°46′21″W
- Type: Plunge
- Total height: 260 m (850 ft)
- Number of drops: 1
- Longest drop: 260 m (850 ft)
- Total width: 24 m (79 ft)
- Average width: 30 m (98 ft)
- Run: 15 m (49 ft)
- Watercourse: Hunlen Creek
- Average flow rate: 4 m^{3}/s (140 cu ft/s)
- World height ranking: 118th (by tallest single drop)

Hunlen Falls is a waterfall located at the mouth of Turner Lake in the Pacific Ranges of British Columbia, Canada. With an estimated height of 260 m (850 ft), it is tied with Takakkaw Falls in Yoho National Park for having the fourth tallest single drop of any waterfall in Canada.

== Name origin ==
The falls were named in 1947 after a Chilcotin Chief named Hana-lin, who used to fish below the falls in the autumn with a fish trap, and trap game nearby. In the 1930s it was sometimes called Mystery Falls and before that occasionally called Bella Coola Falls.

== Structure ==
Hunlen Falls drops 260 m (850 ft) at a 90 degree pitch from the north end of Turner Lake via Hunlen Creek into the Atnarko River, a tributary of the Bella Coola River. Erosion of the canyon below Hunlen Falls has created an alluvial fan into the Atnarko Valley.

== Access ==
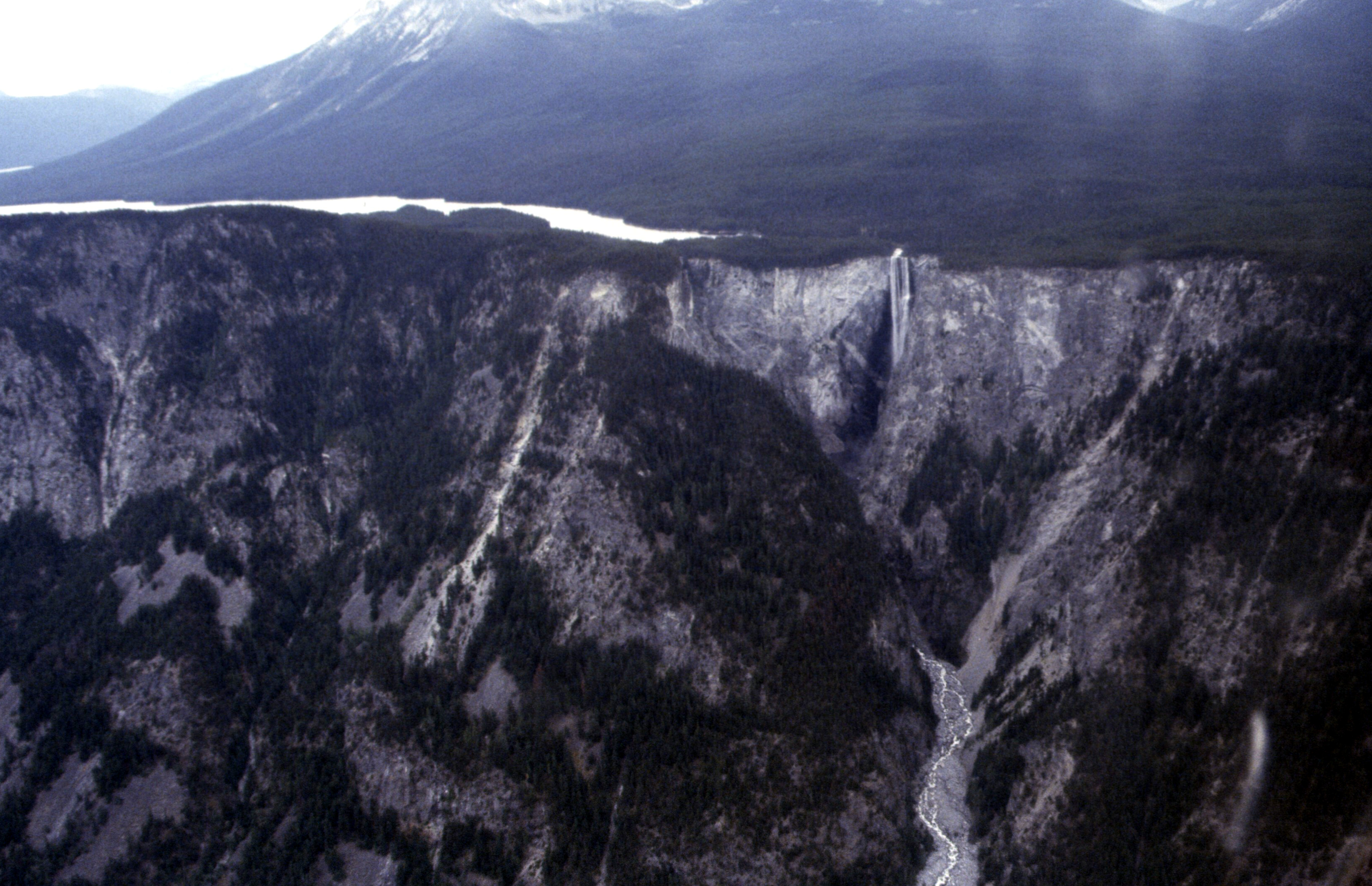
Turner Lake in the background as the source of Hunlen Falls.

There is no road to Hunlen Falls. The easiest access is by float plane from Nimpo Lake, about a 20-minute flight. Planes land on Turner Lake above Hunlen Falls and the walk on a good trail takes about 30 minutes to the unfenced viewpoint on the east rim of the canyon.

There is a hiking trail to Hunlen Falls, starting from Highway #20 at the foot of the Bella Coola Hill. Starting from Highway #20 the Tote Rd offers 4x4 access to the trailhead. The trail is approximately 16 km (10 mi) long. The trail to Turner Lake is cleared and maintained by BC Parks and volunteers.

== Nearby area ==
Lonesome Lake is about 2 km (1.2 mi) to the east of Turner Lake, running parallel to it. It is an S-shaped lake nearly 12 km (7.5 mi) in length and visible from the cliffs at Hunlen Falls. The south end of Lonesome Lake was the site of the pioneer homestead of Ralph Edwards, known as "The Birches", which was occupied from 1912 into the 1970s. His life was made famous by the book Crusoe of Lonesome Lake.

In July 2004 lightning struck the ridge between Turner and Lonesome Lake, igniting what has become known as the Atnarko fire which burned into August. It burned the southern side of Turner Lake up to the falls, as well as destroying a number of residences including the Edwards and Turner homesteads.

== See also ==
- List of waterfalls
- List of waterfalls of Canada
- List of waterfalls in British Columbia
