= Itcha Range =

Mountain range in British Columbia, Canada

- Itcha Mountains; Itchas
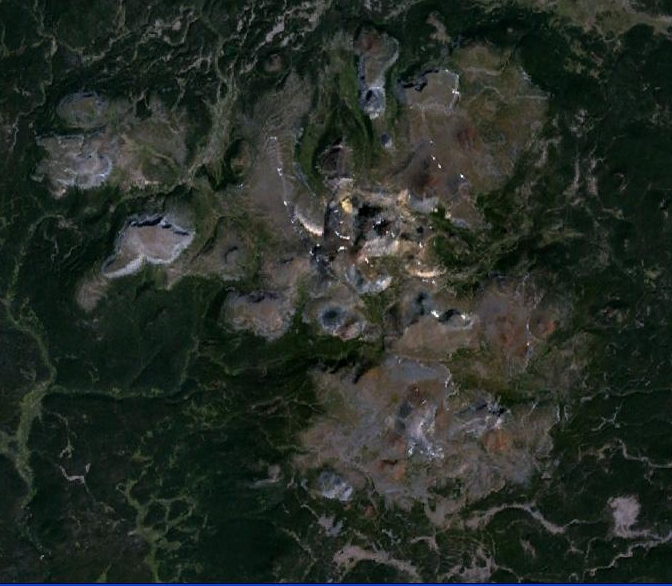
- Satellite image of the Itcha Range

Highest point
- Peak: Mount Downton
- Elevation: 2,375 m (7,792 ft)
- Coordinates: 52°42′21″N 124°51′3″W

Naming
- Native name: ʔAchax Dẑelh (Chilcotin)

Geography
- Location in British Columbia
- Country: Canada
- Province: British Columbia
- District: Range 3 Coast Land District
- Range coordinates: 52°40′00″N 124°50′00″W
- Parent range: Chilcotin Plateau
- Borders on: Ilgachuz Range
- Topo map: NTS 93C10 Downton Creek

Geology
- Formed by: Shield volcano
- Orogeny: Anahim hotspot
- Rock age: Neogene-to-Quaternary
- Rock type: Igneous

The Itcha Range, also known as the Itchas, is a small isolated mountain range in the West-Central Interior of British Columbia, Canada. It is located 40 km (25 mi) northeast of the community of Anahim Lake. With a maximum elevation of 2,375 m (7,792 ft), it is the lowest of three mountain ranges on the Chilcotin Plateau extending east from the Coast Mountains. Two mountains are named in the Itcha Range; Mount Downton and Itcha Mountain. A large provincial park surrounds the Itcha Range and other features in its vicinity. More than 15 animal species are known to exist in the Itcha Range area, as well as a grassland community that is limited only to this location of British Columbia. The Itcha Range is within territory which has been occupied by aboriginal peoples for millennia. This area has a relatively dry environment compared to the Coast Mountains in the west.

In contrast to most mountain ranges in British Columbia, the Itcha Range represents an inactive shield volcano. This highly dissected volcanic edifice consists of a variety of rock types, including basanite, hawaiite, trachyte, rhyolite, phonolite and alkali olivine basalt. They were deposited by different types of volcanic eruptions characterized by passive lava flows and explosivity. Two stages of eruptive activity have been identified at the volcano along with three sub-phases that are limited only to the first stage of development. The main body of the Itcha Range is between 3.8 and 3.0 million years old and thus over two million years ago it passed the most active shield stage of life. A period of dormancy lasting for almost a million years followed, which was interrupted by the post-shield stage of volcanism 2.2 to 0.8 million years ago. More recent volcanic activity in and around the Itcha Range might have occurred in the last 340,000 years to produce cinder cones.

The Itcha Range is part of an east–west trending volcanic zone called the Anahim Volcanic Belt. This consists of large shield volcanoes, small cinder cones, lava domes and lava flows that become progressively younger from west to east. Several explanations have been made regarding the creation of this feature, each citing a different geologic process. If volcanic activity were to resume at the Itcha Range, Canada's Interagency Volcanic Event Notification Plan (IVENP) is prepared to notify people threatened by eruptions.

== Geography ==
=== Location and terrain ===
The Itcha Range is situated on the northern Chilcotin Plateau, a subdivision of the Fraser Plateau which in turn is one of the main subdivisions of the large Interior Plateau. It is bordered on the west by the Ilgachuz Range, another mountain range on the Chilcotin Plateau. The Itcha Range is located within one of British Columbia's many territorial divisions known as the Range 3 Coast Land District.

Stream erosion has played a significant role in dissecting the mountain range, and many of its peaks are dotted with glaciers. This dissection has resulted in a variety of landforms, such as valleys, crags and domes. Small graveled creeks flow from alpine mountains out onto the regional prairies where there are pale blue rock-bottomed lakes, including the so-named Itcha Lake. Three streams drain the Itcha Range, namely Corkscrew Creek, Downton Creek and Shag Creek. Although the Itcha Range has been dissected by stream erosion and subsequently glaciated, its original shape has been largely preserved. Rocks in the Itcha Range are a variety of colours, including red, white and yellow.

=== Climate ===
The climate of the Itcha Range is influenced by the presence of the Coast Mountains to the west, which disrupt the flow of the prevailing westerly winds and causes them to drop most of their moisture on the western slopes of the Coast Mountains before reaching the Interior Plateau, casting a rain shadow over the Itcha Range.

In contrast to the Coast Mountains, the Interior Plateau experiences a precipitation peak in the summer months, reflecting the influence of summer convective storms, and most of winter precipitation falls as snow. The mean annual precipitation for the area ranges from about 40 to 80 cm (16 to 31 in) whereas the mean annual temperature is approximately 3 °C (37 °F), with a summer mean of 12.5 °C (54.5 °F) and a winter mean of −8 °C (18 °F).

=== Flora and fauna ===
The Itcha Range area is home to a grassland ecosystem that has not been found elsewhere in southern or central British Columbia. It is dominated by communities of Altai fescue and lichen. Extensive and diverse alpine and subalpine vegetation is also present in the area, some species of which are at the northernmost or southernmost of their range.

Several animal species inhabit around the Itcha Range. Among them are cougars, wolves, grizzly bears, black bears, moose, mule deers, mountain goats, beavers, coyotes, red foxes, muskrats, martens, river otters, lynx and wolverines. Also present is the largest herd of woodland caribou in southern British Columbia, as well as the most northerly population of California bighorn sheep in North America.

== Geology ==
=== Background ===
A number of mechanisms have been proposed to interpret the origin of volcanism in the Anahim Volcanic Belt. This includes rift propagation and melting of mantle associated with lithospheric fracturing due to flexuring of the crust along the northern edge of the subducting Juan de Fuca Plate. However, insignificant evidence exists to support these hypotheses. The most common and best mechanism used to explain Anahim Belt volcanic activity is a stationary hotspot. This is supported by a well-defined progression in age of volcanism from west to east along the belt that compares well with the age trend of the Yellowstone hotspot track. The North American Plate moves westward over the hotspot at a rate of between 20 and 30 mm (0.79 and 1.18 in) per year. Nazko Cone, a volcanic cone east of the Itcha Range, is centred near the Anahim hotspot.

The extent of the Anahim Volcanic Belt, including the Rainbow, Ilgachuz and Itcha ranges

The Anahim hotspot is underlain by a low-velocity anomaly that extends approximately 400 km (250 mi) into the mantle north of the Juan de Fuca slab. However, this low-velocity anomaly may extend deeper southward beneath the Juan de Fuca slab. Coupled with the well documented temporal progression of surface volcanism, this has led to the conclusion that the Anahim hotspot is supplied by a mantle plume over slab edge flow. A small high-velocity anomaly east of Nazko Cone marks the eastern extent of the Anahim hotspot track.

Magmatism in the Anahim Volcanic Belt can be traced as far back as 10–14 million years ago with the emplacement of dike swarms and plutons as well as the eruption of rhyolite flows and breccias on the British Columbia Coast. The slow continuous westward motion of the North American Plate during the late Neogene positioned the Anahim hotspot further east at the Chilcotin Plateau where volcanic activity built the Rainbow Range shield volcano 8.7 to 6.7 million years ago. Volcanism then shifted eastwards, in displacement contrary with the North American Plate's movement, 6.1 million years ago to construct the Ilgachuz Range shield volcano. Renewed volcanic activity southeast of the Ilgachuz Range starting 3.5 million years ago led to the creation of the Itcha Range, the youngest of the three Anahim shield volcanoes. The Itcha Range continued to be an area of Anahim hotspot volcanism well into the Quaternary period (2.58 million years ago to present).

=== Structure ===
The Itcha Range is the smallest shield volcano in the Anahim Volcanic Belt in terms of area covered. Unlike the Rainbow and Ilgachuz ranges, the Itcha Range is composed of small coalescing volcanic units rather than a stratiform volcanic pile. It is, in many respects, similar to the small alkaline shields found in Kenya and Ethiopia along the East African Rift. About 60% of the shield is exposed whereas roughly 40% of it remains buried under glacial drift deposits. This suggests that the Itcha Range was glaciated repeatedly during the Pleistocene epoch. Glacial striae on polished surfaces of some of the oldest volcanic rocks in the eastern part of the shield and the local presence of drift deposits throughout the stratigraphy indicate that glaciation and volcanism were contemporaneous through much of the volcanic history of the Itcha Range.

With a maximum elevation of 2,375 m (7,792 ft), the Itcha Range is the lowest of the three Anahim shield volcanoes. Its highest point is Mount Downton, which is situated in the middle of the shield. Just to the northeast is Itcha Mountain, the second highest peak with an elevation of 2,290 m (7,510 ft). These peaks are situated on top of the shield, which has a topographic prominence of about 690 m (2,260 ft).

The Itcha Range has a broad, gently sloping structure typical of shield volcanoes. It is mainly composed of 70 to 150 m (230 to 490 ft) thick felsic lava flows that were erupted from a central vent. These are overlain by 1 to 4 m (3.3 to 13.1 ft) thick mafic alkaline lava flows and at least 30 small cinder cones. Hawaiite is the dominant rock type, but alkali olivine basalt and spinel lherzolite-bearing basanite is also present. They merge laterally with lavas of the much older Chilcotin Group, which surrounds the Anahim Volcanic Belt. However, the exact nature of the relationship between the Anahim Volcanic Belt and the Chilcotin Group is unknown.

Exposed in the middle of the mountain range is an assemblage of deformed andesite to dacite lava flows and volcanoclastic sediments. These basement rocks were created during the late Mesozoic era, long before the Itcha Range formed. They are similar to rocks found in the Hazelton Group, situated north of the Itcha Range, and the Ootsa Lake Group of the Intermontane Belt.

=== Volcanic history ===
Two stages of volcanic activity constructed the Itcha Range. The first stage, referred to as the felsic shield-building stage, occurred between 3.8 and 3.0 million years ago. Three phases comprise this stage; a pre-explosive phase, an explosive phase and a post-explosive phase. Analysis of the first trachyte magmas to erupt during the pre-explosive phase suggest they were relatively fluid as shown by their areal extent. Eruptions became more viscous during the explosive phase, followed by more viscosity during the post-explosive phase. As a result, the volume of erupted material became smaller over time. The increasing viscousness of felsic lava during the shield-building stage suggests a maturing plumbing system underneath the Itcha Range, which may have consisted of multiple, isolated, cupola-type magma chambers.

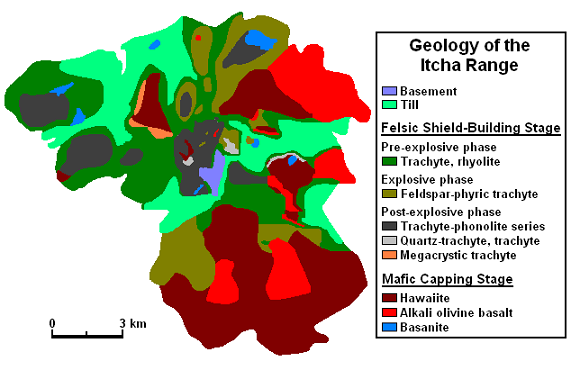
Geological map of the Itcha Range showing stages of development

A 900,000‑year‑long period of quiescence followed after the felsic shield-building stage, during which time erosion ate away at the shield's gentle slopes. This quiescence was followed by a mafic capping stage between 2.2 and 0.8 million years ago, but renewed activity might have occurred in the last 340,000 years. Alkali olivine basalts of the mafic capping stage were derived from the fractionation of a clinopyroxene, olivine and oxide assemblage. However, the associated hawaiite lavas may have derived from an alkali olivine basalt parent by the fractionation of a clinopyroxene-dominated assemblage at higher pressures. As volcanic activity waned during the mafic capping stage, lava flows became more viscous and decreased in volume. This suggests that parental magmas may have been derived by increasingly smaller degrees of partial melting with time. If volcanic activity of the Itcha Range is related to a hotspot, this temporal and spatial evolution would suggest a waning heat source.

The main body of the shield erupted over an area of about 300 km^{2} (120 mi^{2}). Volcanic activity associated with the Itcha Range extended 20 km (12 mi) south to the Satah Mountain area where lavas erupted along a north-northwest trending fault system and covered an additional area of 250 km^{2} (97 mi^{2}). Although the Satah Mountain volcanic field is not part of the Itcha Range, it is linked to the range by a volcanic ridge.

==== Felsic shield-building stage ====
The felsic shield-building stage began with the eruption of phonolite, trachyte, phonolitic trachyte, quartz-trachyte and rhyolite lava. Subsequent volcanism of the pre-explosive phase produced a basal sequence of aphyric trachyte lava flows and domes with minor altered flow-banded rhyolite, sulfide-bearing rhyolitic tuffs and a few thin hawaiite lava flows. This activity was concentrated at the summit of the volcano as shown by the increasing thickness of volcanic material towards the summit. A hydrothermally altered aphyric trachyte dike, which forms a narrow ridge linking Mount Downton and Itcha Mountain, might have been the source for these eruptions.

After the basal trachytes were erupted, the explosive phase produced alkali-feldspar porphyritic trachytes, which erupted as pyroclastic deposits with minor, small lava flows and domes. The explosive eruptions produced pumice flows, bedded tuffs, debris flows, reworked polymict debris flows and lava flows less than 20 m (66 ft) thick. The porphyritic trachytes erupted at the summit of the shield and flowed towards the northeast and east. Because the porphyritic pyroclastic deposits are buried by younger volcanic rocks and glacial drift deposits, the maximum thickness of them is unknown.

The felsic shield-building stage ended with the post-explosive phase. This phase of activity created small volcanic plugs, lava flows, minor pyroclastic flows, channelized debris flows and a few glassy dikes at the summit of the shield volcano. These consist of alkali-feldspar porphyritic quartz-trachyte and trachyte. Alkali-feldspar quartz-trachyte plugs formed in rhyolites and trachytes of the pre-explosive phase, as well as pyroclastic deposits and feldspar trachyte lava flows of the explosive phase. Later activity produced trachyte and phonolite plugs and lava flows. This volcanism occurred mainly at the shield's summit and on its western flank. Massive lava flows from this volcanic activity have a thickness of about 100 m (330 ft) whereas three successive lava flows at the summit have a combined thickness of more than 200 m (660 ft). Lava from the western flank flowed over basement rocks and trachytes of the pre-explosive phase. In contrast, lava from the summit flowed over pyroclastic rocks and lava flows of the explosive phase. Mount Downton and Itcha Mountain were formed during this eruptive period. The final volcanic event of the post-explosive phase produced 7 to 10 m (23 to 33 ft) thick trachyte lava flows on the western flank.

==== Mafic capping stage ====
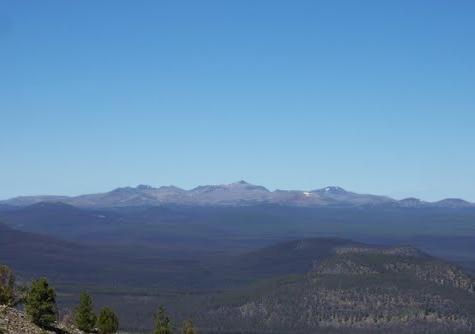
The Itcha Range as seen from the south

During the mafic capping stage, basanite, alkali olivine basalt and hawaiite erupted mainly from small parasitic cones, tuff rings and fissures in the eastern half of the shield. Eruptions occurred subglacially, subaqueously and/or subaerially as shown by a wide range in the degree of vesicularity, freshness and glass content of the lavas. In most cases, each parasitic cone produced three or four lava flows from breaches in the cone walls. These were erupted as pāhoehoe and ʻaʻā, but the tops of the lava flows are commonly missing due to erosion. Hawaiite was the most extensively erupted lava of the mafic capping stage, occurring mostly at the southern end of the Itcha Range but also in its interior.

Volcanism of the mafic capping stage began with the eruption of aphyric hawaiite lava flows. These were extruded from dikes and dissected cinder cones in the central and southeastern parts of the Itcha Range. Alkali olivine basalts were erupted contemporaneously from younger better preserved cinder cones and form lava flows reaching 30 m (98 ft) thick. Once the alkali olivine basalt flows cooled, they formed well-developed columnar joints. Feldspar-phyric, highly vesiculated hawaiites and benmoreites were later erupted from several vents on the summit of Itcha Mountain.

In the northwestern and northeastern parts of the shield volcano, basanite lava flows were erupted and are volumetrically subordinate. These represent the youngest known lavas of the Itcha Range. However, a cinder cone in the middle of the shield could be much younger, perhaps as young as the basanites at Nazko Cone to the east, which were erupted 340,000 to 7,100 years ago. The older basanites in the Itcha Range may have been erupted contemporaneously with the late feldspar hawaiites.

=== Parasitic cones ===
Parasitic cones of the Itcha Range shield were formed mainly during the Early Pleistocene mafic capping stage between 2.2 and 0.8 million years ago. These secondary vents are monogenetic in nature, meaning each cone was only active for a single eruption sequence before becoming extinct. The duration of volcanic activity at these cones can last from hours to years. Parasitic cones of the Itcha Range are small cinder cones situated at the summit and flanks of the shield volcano.

A 3D model of the Itcha Range showing the several parasitic cones that dot the range

Name	Coordinates	References
Downton Cone 01	52.69°N 124.79°W	Natural Resources Canada
Downton Cone 02	52.68°N 124.77°W	Natural Resources Canada
Downton Cone 03	52.67°N 124.78°W	Natural Resources Canada
Downton Cone 04	52.68°N 124.73°W	Natural Resources Canada
Downton Cone 05	52.70°N 124.72°W	Natural Resources Canada
Downton Cone 06	52.65°N 124.77°W	Natural Resources Canada
Downton Cone 07	52.64°N 124.79°W	Natural Resources Canada
Downton Cone 08	52.64°N 124.69°W	Natural Resources Canada
Downton Cone 09	52.64°N 124.7°W	Natural Resources Canada
Downton Cone 10	52.64°N 124.65°W	Natural Resources Canada
Downton South-A	52.61°N 124.89°W	Natural Resources Canada
Downton South-B	52.60°N 124.8°W	Natural Resources Canada
Downton South-C	52.62°N 124.77°W	Natural Resources Canada
Downton South-D	52.63°N 124.83°W	Natural Resources Canada
Downton South-E	52.61°N 124.71°W	Natural Resources Canada
Itcha Cone 01	52.73°N 124.8°W	Natural Resources Canada
Itcha Cone 02	52.73°N 124.77°W	Natural Resources Canada
Itcha Cone 03	52.72°N 124.75°W	Natural Resources Canada
Itcha Cone 04	52.76°N 124.8°W	Natural Resources Canada
Itcha Cone 05	52.76°N 124.81°W	Natural Resources Canada
Itcha Cone 06	52.76°N 124.85°W	Natural Resources Canada
Itcha Cone 07	52.75°N 124.89°W	Natural Resources Canada
Itcha Cone 08	52.72°N 124.91°W	Natural Resources Canada

== Human history ==
=== Naming ===
The Itcha Range has had at least two forms of names throughout its history. It was originally named the Itcha Mountains as identified in the 1930 BC Gazetteer. This form of name remained official until March 13, 1947, when it was changed to its current form, Itcha Range, as part of an official government policy. Larger mountain ranges throughout British Columbia, such as the Coast Mountains, retained their gazetted names whereas smaller ones, especially ranges of larger groupings, were subjected to renaming. In more casual speech, the Itcha Range is referred to as the Itchas. The name Itcha is indigenous in origin, coming from the local Tsilhqot'in people.

Mount Downton was named by D. M. MacKay, a member of the British Columbia Land Surveyors (BCLS) who conducted topographical surveys in the area. He named it after Geoffrey M. Downton, another BCLS member who is credited for first noting the hydroelectric potential inherent in the elevation differential between the Bridge River and Seton Lake on opposing sides of Mission Ridge above Shalalth in December 1912. This name for the mountain was adopted on February 7, 1947. The name Itcha Mountain was adopted on March 4, 1954, for the range's second highest peak.

=== Occupation ===
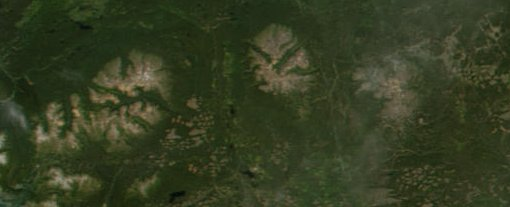
The three Anahim shield volcanoes. Left to right are the Rainbow Range, the Ilgachuz Range and the Itcha Range.

Indigenous people of the Dakelh and Tsilhqot'in tribes have inhabited the area for hundreds of years. In pre-contact times, these people lived a nomadic lifestyle. They did not build permanent structures in which to live, as they moved from region to region to find food and resources. Animals such as martin, moose and caribou were hunted and trapped by the Dakelh and Tsilhqot'in tribes. In summer, these people gathered roots, plants and a volcanic glass called obsidian. Anahim obsidian was traded widely throughout the Interior and up and down the Coast from the community of Bella Coola. Arrowheads and knives were made from obsidian because when it breaks with a characteristic conchoidal fracture, it creates very sharp edges. A modified form of this lifestyle is practiced by some indigenous people to this day.

Settlers arrived in the area from Bella Coola in the early 1900s to establish ranches. One particular ranch, the Home Ranch, used the Blackwater Trail between the Ilgachuz and Itcha ranges to carry supplies and cattle to be sold at cattle sales in the small city of Quesnel. Remains of this ranch are still present, as well as many trails that were used as supply routes.

The Itcha Range and the surrounding area were designated as a Class A provincial park in 1995 to protect the alpine grasslands, wetlands and wildlife habitats. This 111,977 ha (276,700 acres) protected area was named Itcha Ilgachuz Provincial Park after the Itcha and Ilgachuz ranges, the latter of which is also in the park.

== Monitoring and volcanic hazards ==
Like other volcanoes in the Anahim Volcanic Belt, the Itcha Range is not monitored closely enough by the Geological Survey of Canada to ascertain how active its magma system is. The Canadian National Seismograph Network has been established to monitor earthquakes throughout Canada, but it is too far away to provide an accurate indication of activity under the range. It may sense an increase in seismic activity if the Itcha Range becomes highly restless, but this may only provide a warning for a large eruption; the system might detect activity only once the volcano has started erupting. If the Itcha Range were to erupt, mechanisms exist to orchestrate relief efforts. The Interagency Volcanic Event Notification Plan (IVENP) was created to outline the notification procedure of some of the main agencies that would respond to an erupting volcano in Canada, an eruption close to the Canada–United States border or any eruption that would affect Canada.

Because of the remote location of the Itcha Range, future eruptions are not a major hazard. Future volcanism is most likely in the form of basaltic cinder cones, but eruptions of felsic magma can not be ruled out. The most immediate hazard relating to future eruptions is of local concern only and includes the possibility of forest fires by lava flows and the disruption of local air traffic if an eruption column is produced. Volcanic ash reduces visibility and can cause jet engine failure, as well as damage to other aircraft systems.

== See also ==
- Geology of British Columbia
- Volcanism of Western Canada
- List of volcanoes in Canada
