= Fissure vent =

Linear volcanic vent through which lava erupts

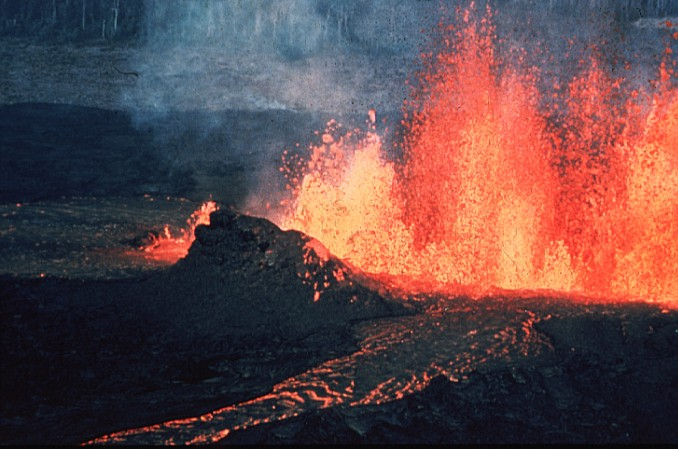
A volcanic fissure and lava channel with lava fountain

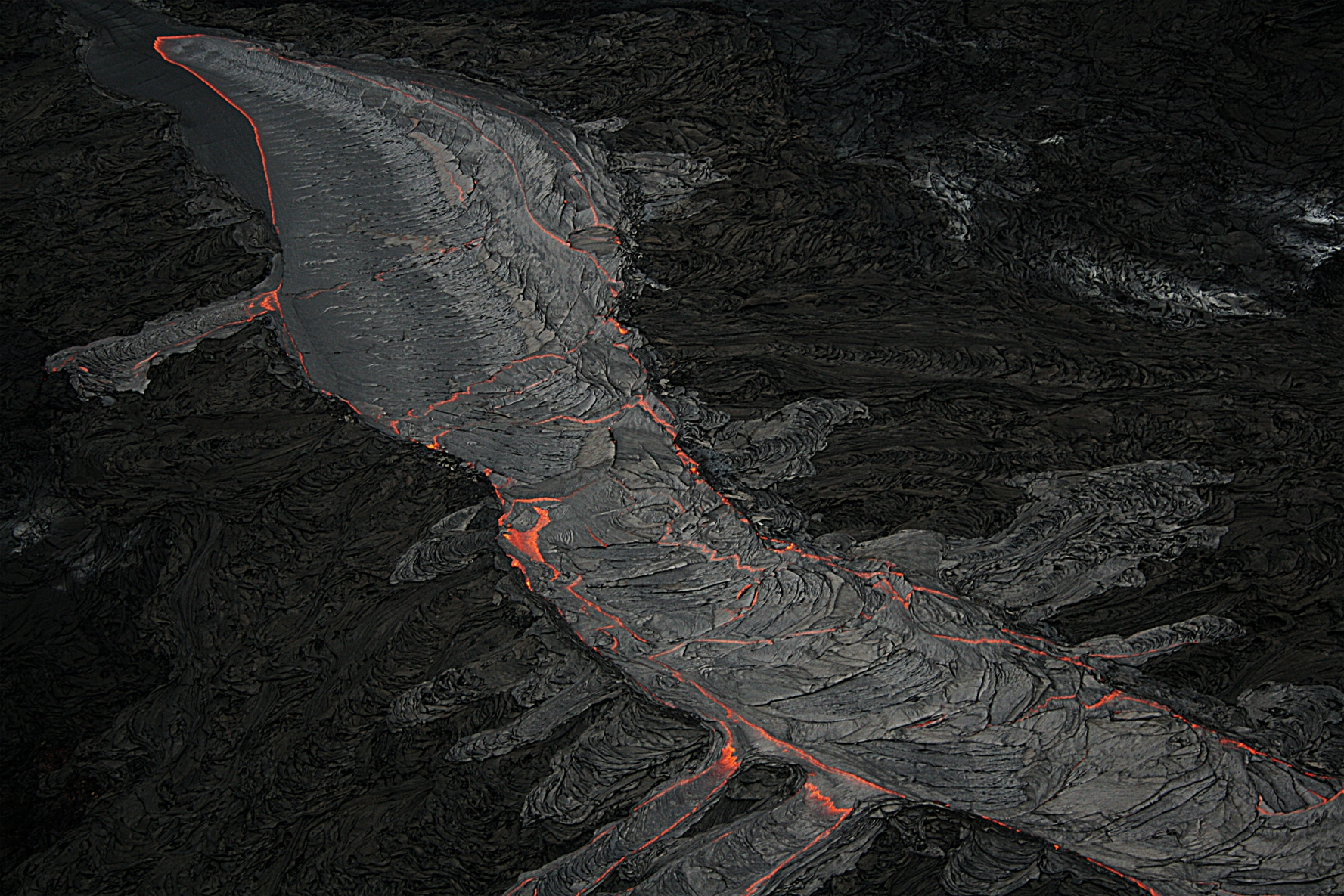
Channel of lava erupted during a fissure eruption of Kīlauea volcano, Hawaii, 2007

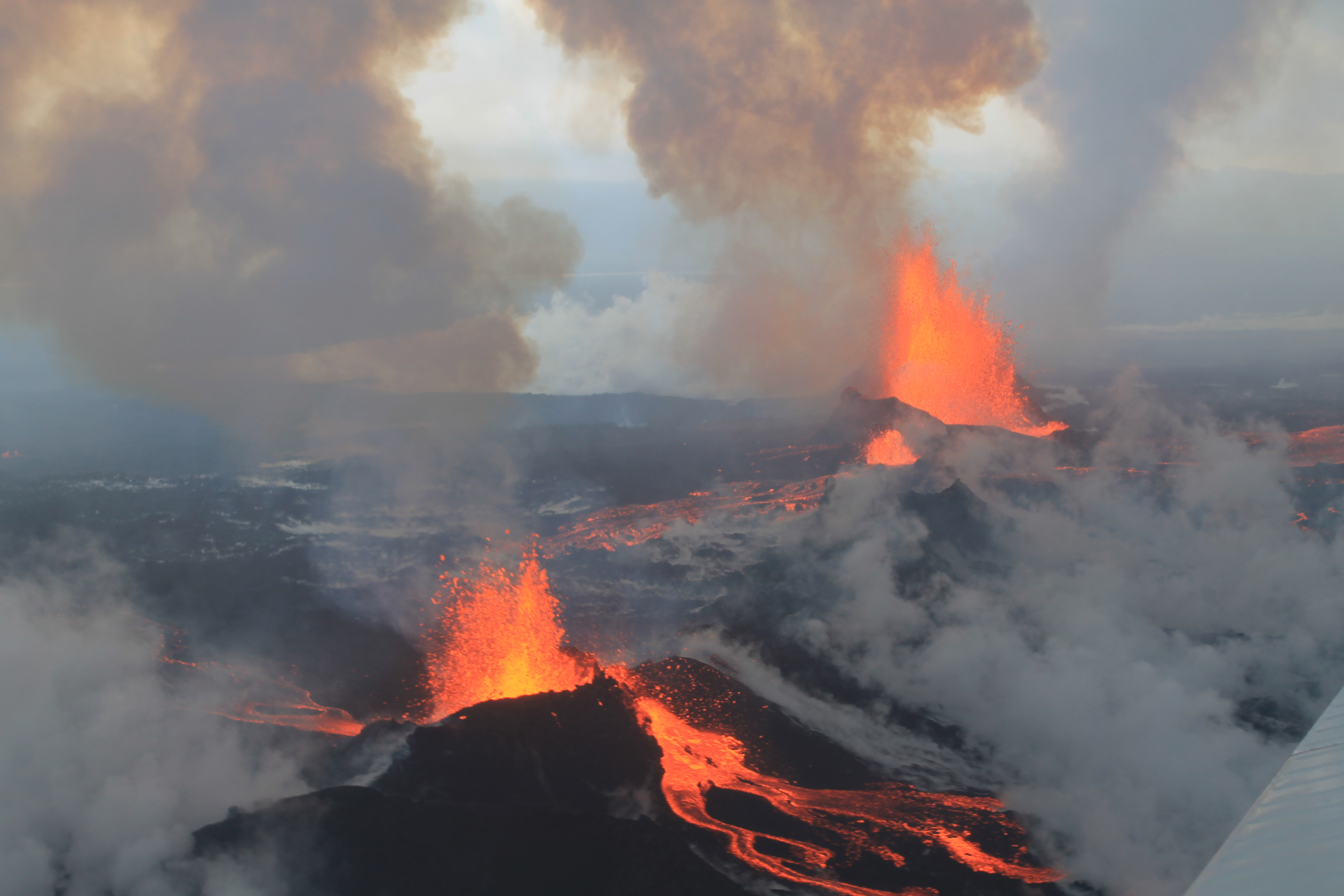
Eruption fissure with spatter cones, Holuhraun, Iceland, 2014

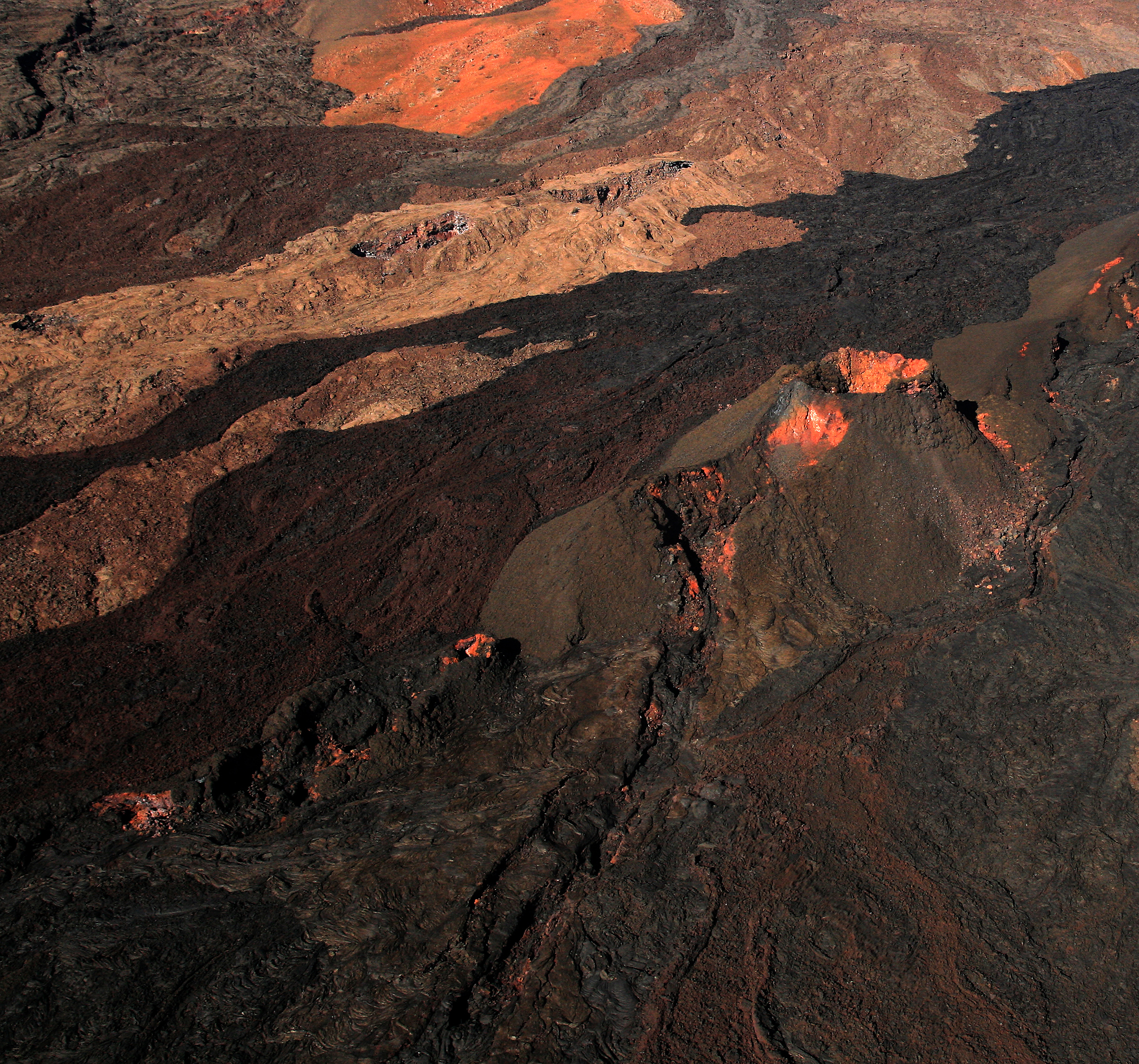
Mauna Loa with different lava flows and fissure vent

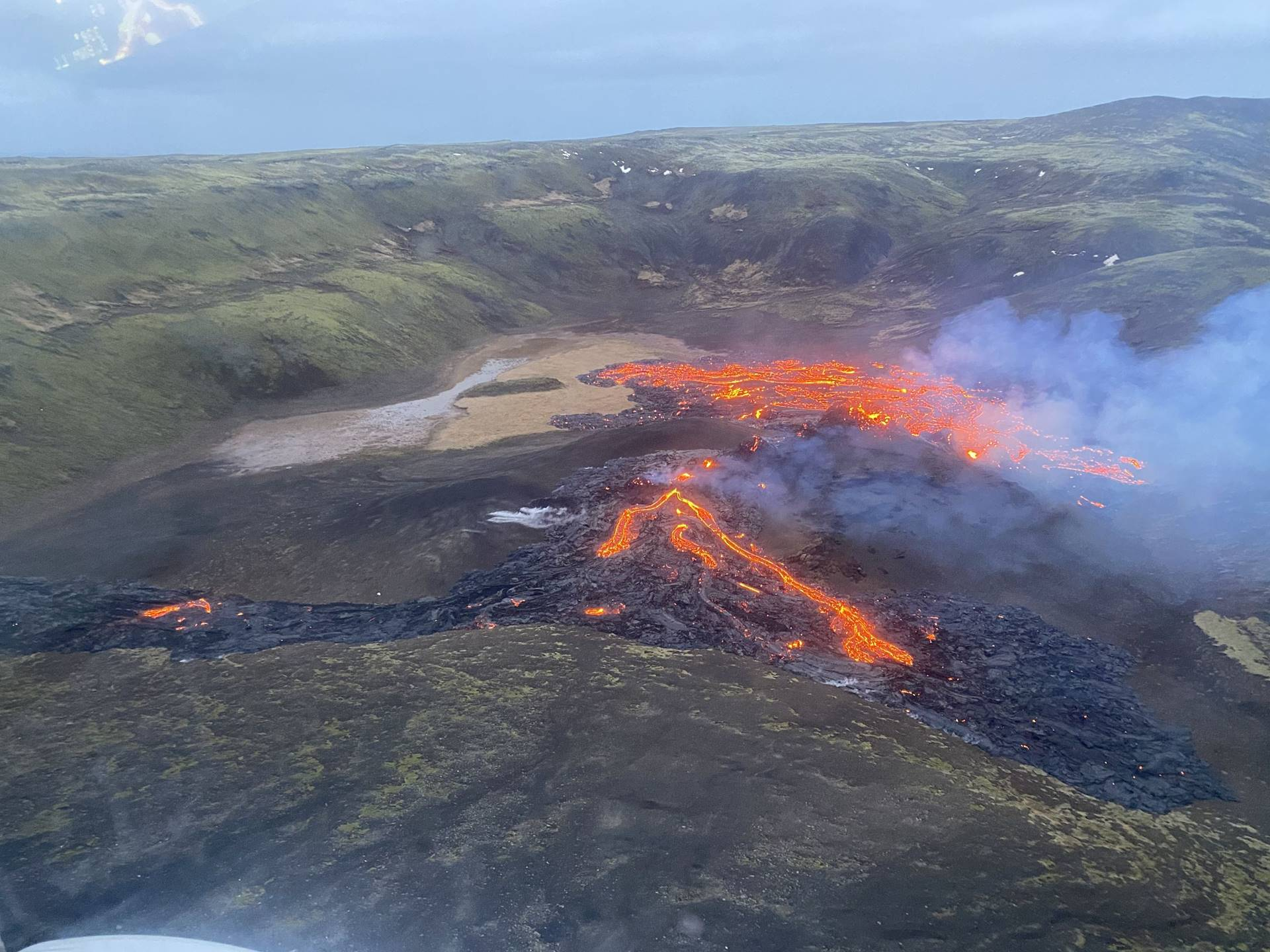
A volcanic fissure eruption on Fagradalsfjall, Iceland, 2021

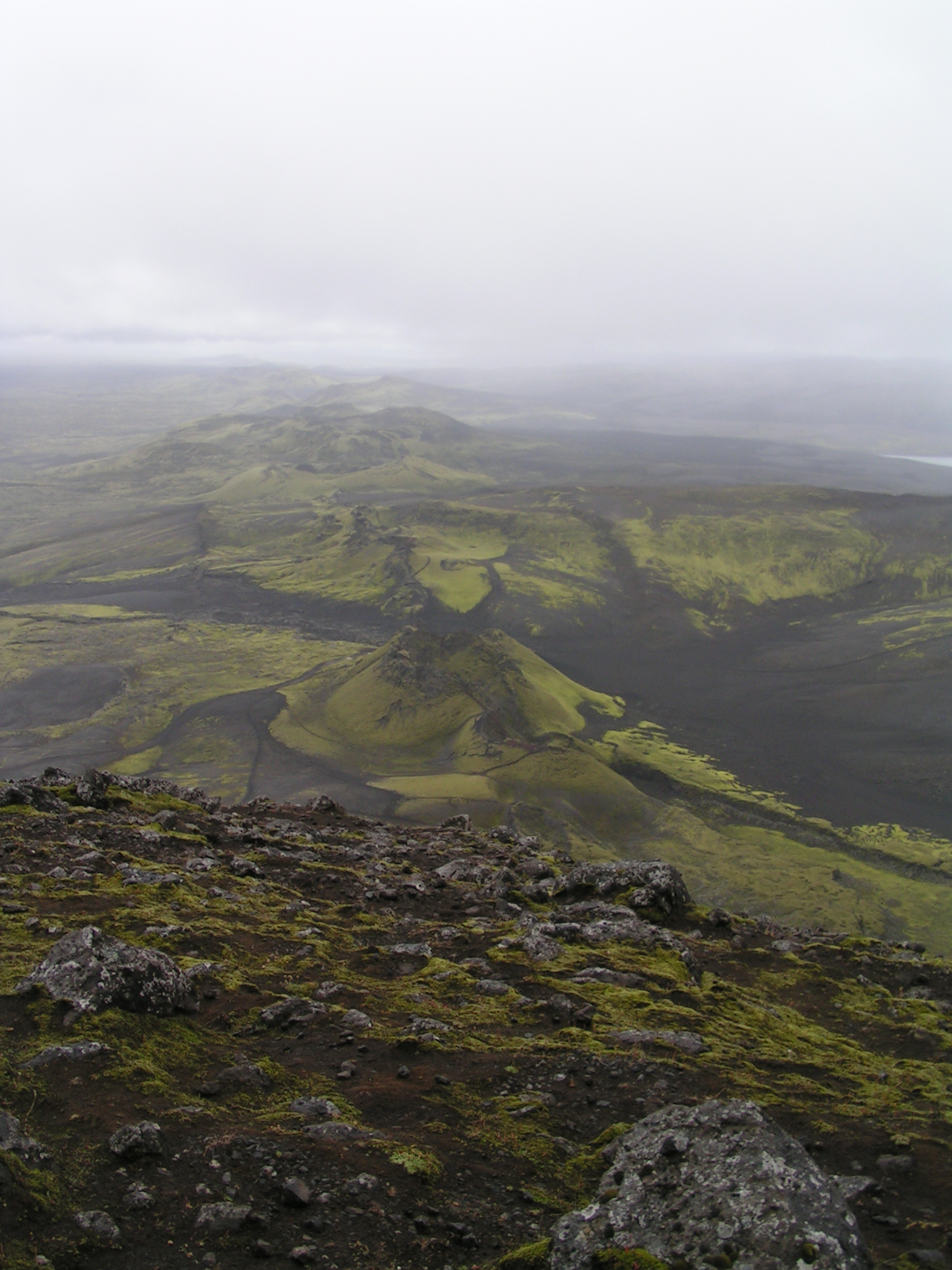
Crater row of Laki

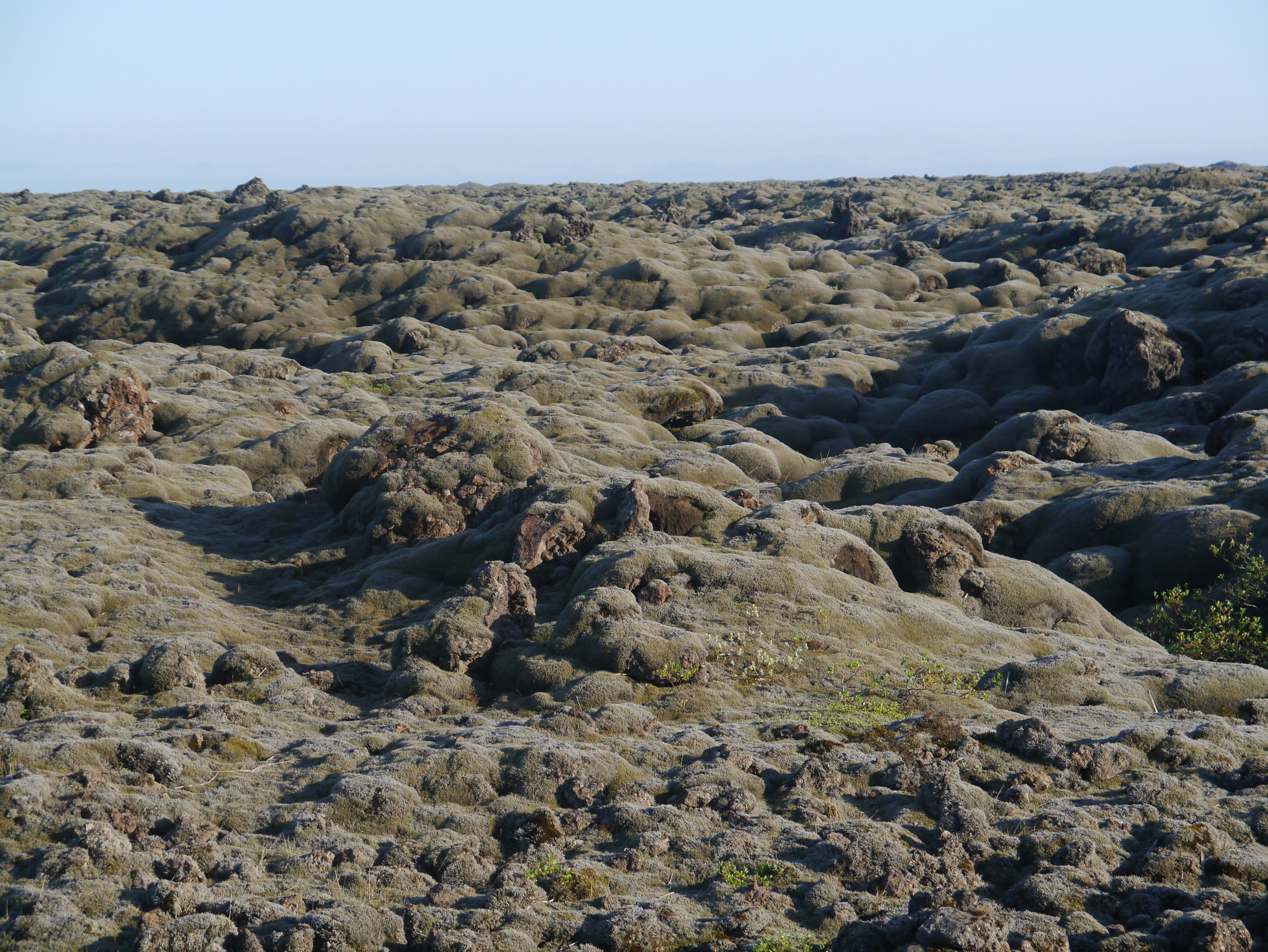
Eldhraun, a lava field produced by the Laki craters

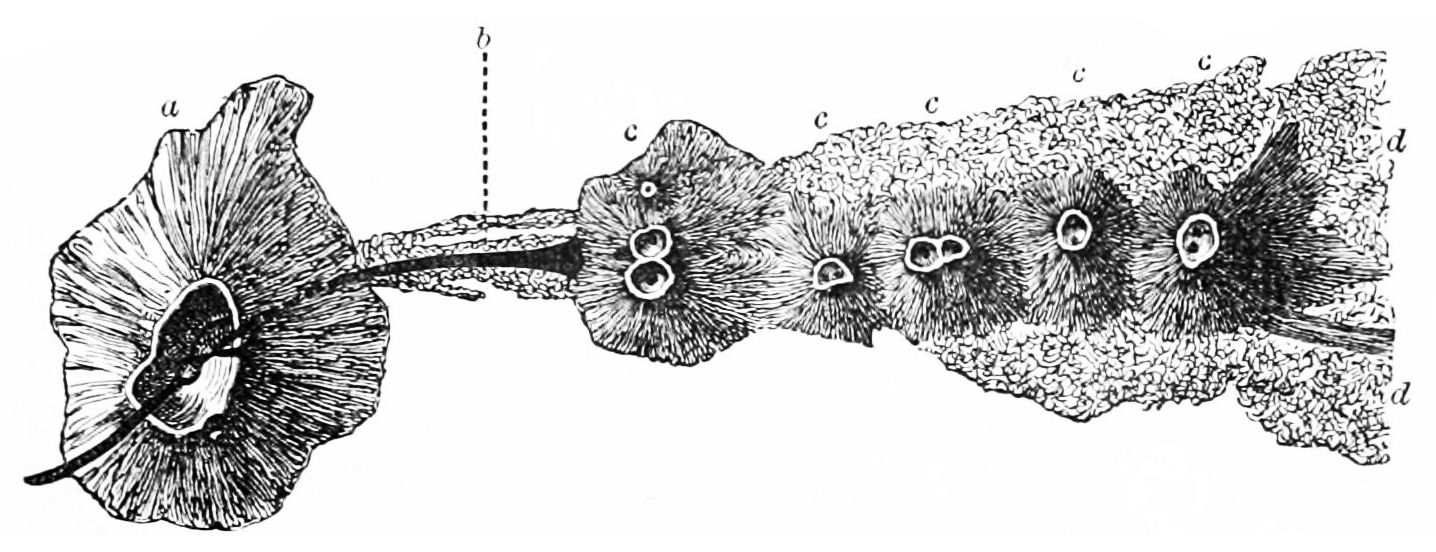
Cinder cones on Etna

A fissure vent, also known as a volcanic fissure, eruption fissure or simply a fissure, is a linear volcanic vent through which lava erupts, usually without any explosive activity. The vent is often a few metres wide and may be many kilometres long. Fissure vents can cause large flood basalts which run first in lava channels and later in lava tubes. After some time, the eruption tends to become focused at one or more spatter cones. Volcanic cones and their craters that are aligned along a fissure form a crater row. Small fissure vents may not be easily discernible from the air, but the crater rows (see Laki) or the canyons (see Eldgjá) built up by some of them are.

The dikes that feed fissures reach the surface from depths of a few kilometers and connect them to deeper magma reservoirs, often under volcanic centers. Fissures are usually found in or along rifts and rift zones, such as Iceland and the East African Rift. Fissure vents are often part of the structure of shield volcanoes.

== Iceland ==
In Iceland, volcanic vents, which can be long fissures, often open parallel to the rift zones where the Eurasian and the North American lithospheric plates are diverging, a system which is part of the Mid-Atlantic Ridge. Renewed eruptions generally occur from new parallel fractures offset by a few hundred to thousands of metres from the earlier fissures. This distribution of vents and sometimes voluminous eruptions of fluid basaltic lava usually builds up a thick lava plateau, rather than a single volcanic edifice. But there are also the central volcanoes, composite volcanoes, often with calderas, which have been formed during thousands of years, and eruptions with one or more magma reservoirs underneath controlling their respective fissure system.

The Laki fissures, part of the Grímsvötn volcanic system, produced one of the biggest effusive eruptions on earth in historical times, in the form of a flood basalt of 12–14 km^{3} of lava in 1783. During the Eldgjá eruption A.D. 934–40, another very big effusive fissure eruption in the volcanic system of Katla in South Iceland, ~18 km^{3} (4.3 cu mi) of lava were released. In September 2014, a fissure eruption was ongoing on the site of the 18th century lava field Holuhraun. The eruption is part of an eruption series in the Bárðarbunga volcanic system.

== Hawaii ==
The radial fissure vents of Hawaiian volcanoes also produce "curtains of fire" as lava fountains erupting along a portion of a fissure. These vents build up low ramparts of basaltic spatter on both sides of the fissure. More isolated lava fountains along the fissure produce crater rows of small spatter and cinder cones. The fragments that form a spatter cone are hot and plastic enough to weld together, while the fragments that form a cinder cone remain separate because of their lower temperature.

== List of fissure vents ==
Sourced from the Global Volcanism Program's Volcanoes of the World database (v. 5.3.6), filtered to entries whose Primary Volcano Type is "Fissure vent" or "Fissure vent(s)".

Name	Elevation		Location	Last known eruption
Name	metres	feet	Coordinates	Last known eruption
(Bolivia) Quetena	5730	18799	22.2500°S 67.4200°W	Pleistocene
(Spain) Gran Canaria	1950	6398	28.0000°N 15.5800°W	40 CE
(Georgia (country)) Dzau	1904	6247	42.4040°N 44.0040°E	Pleistocene
(Ethiopia) East Ziway	1889	6198	7.8740°N 38.9020°E	Unknown
(Iceland) Hofsjökull	1765	5791	64.8330°N 18.7660°W	Unknown
(United States) Eagle Lake Field	1652	5420	40.6300°N 120.8300°W	Pleistocene
(Iceland) Katla	1490	4888	63.6330°N 19.0830°W	1918
(Iceland) Prestahnúkur	1385	4544	64.5830°N 20.6660°W	3350 BCE
(Laos) Bolaven Plateau	1350	4429	15.1420°N 106.4500°E	Pleistocene
(Iceland) Oddnýjarhnjúkur–Langjökull	1100	3609	64.8500°N 19.7000°W	950
(Portugal) São Jorge Island	1053	3455	38.6500°N 28.0800°W	1902
(Iceland) Fjallgarðar Ridge	1035	3396	65.5000°N 15.6700°W	Pleistocene
(Iceland) Tungnaárfjöll	983	3225	64.1640°N 18.4960°W	Pleistocene
(Ethiopia) Hertali	900	2953	9.7800°N 40.3300°E	Unknown
(Nicaragua) Estelí	899	2949	13.1700°N 86.4000°W	Pleistocene
(Iceland) Lambafjöll	840	2756	65.8670°N 17.1330°W	Pleistocene
(Ethiopia) Manda Gargori	700	2297	11.7500°N 41.4800°E	Unknown
(Spain) Lanzarote	670	2198	29.0300°N 13.6300°W	1824
(Ethiopia) (Djibouti) Manda-Inakir	600	1969	12.3800°N 42.2000°E	1928
(Ethiopia) Dalaffilla	578	1896	13.7930°N 40.5530°E	2008
(Spain) Fuerteventura	529	1736	28.3580°N 14.0200°W	Unknown
(Myanmar) Namyong	508	1667	25.6800°N 96.4300°E	Pleistocene
(Myanmar) Singu Plateau	507	1663	22.7000°N 95.9800°E	Pleistocene
(Iceland) Heiðarsporðar	490	1608	65.5830°N 16.8170°W	300 BCE
(Nicaragua) Nejapa-Miraflores	360	1181	12.1200°N 86.3200°W	1060
(Portugal) Picos Volcanic Fissural System	350	1148	37.7800°N 25.6700°W	1652
(Indonesia) Sukadana Basalts	300	984	5.2500°S 105.6500°E	Pleistocene
(Djibouti) Ardoukoba	298	978	11.5800°N 42.4700°E	1978
(Iceland) Vestmannaeyjar	283	928	63.4160°N 20.2660°W	1973
(Nicaragua) Granada	250	820	11.9000°N 85.9790°W	Unknown
(Iceland) Fagradalsfjall	250	820	63.8950°N 22.2580°W	2023
(Romania) Lucareț Basalts	190	623	45.8260°N 21.6900°E	Pleistocene
(Myanmar) Medaw Island	115	377	11.7200°N 98.6700°E	Pleistocene
(Greece) Poros	80	262	37.4800°N 23.4300°E	Pleistocene
(Iceland) Eldey	70	230	63.7330°N 23.0000°W	1926
(Myanmar) Thaton	30	98	17.4200°N 96.9500°E	Pleistocene
(Iceland) Kolbeinsey Ridge	5	16	66.6700°N 18.5000°W	1755
(Iceland) Tjörnes Fracture Zone	−75	−246	66.3090°N 17.1180°W	1868
(Portugal) Monaco Bank	−197	−646	37.6000°N 25.8800°W	1911
Hollister Ridge	−1000	−3281	53.9980°S 139.8450°W	Unknown
(Tonga) West Mata	−1174	−3852	15.1000°S 173.7500°W	2009
(Papua New Guinea) Titan Ridge Volcano	−1300	−4265	3.0300°S 147.7800°E	1972
(Tonga) Tafu-Maka	−1400	−4593	15.3700°S 174.2300°W	2008
Axial Seamount	−1410	−4626	45.9500°N 130.0000°W	2015
Romanche Fracture Zone	−1528	−5013	0.4330°S 19.5960°W	Unknown
(United States) Escanaba Segment	−1700	−5577	40.9800°N 127.5000°W	2260 BCE
Vance Segment	−1985	−6512	45.3000°N 130.1000°W	Pleistocene
(Canada) Endeavour Segment	−2050	−6726	47.9500°N 129.1000°W	3490 BCE
(Canada) Cobb Segment	−2100	−6890	46.8800°N 129.3300°W	1180 BCE
Cleft Segment	−2140	−7021	44.8300°N 130.3000°W	1986
(Mexico) Northern EPR at 16°N	−2300	−7546	15.8300°N 105.4300°W	50 BCE
CoAxial Segment	−2400	−7874	46.5200°N 129.5800°W	1993
(Ecuador) Galapagos Rift at 86°W	−2430	−7972	0.7920°N 86.1500°W	1996
Northern EPR at 9.8°N	−2500	−8202	9.8300°N 104.3000°W	2025
(Canada) West Valley Segment	−2550	−8366	48.7800°N 128.6400°W	Unknown
Southern EPR at 17.5°S (Segment K)	−2566	−8419	17.4360°S 113.2060°W	1990
Southern EPR at 18.5°S (Segment I)	−2600	−8530	18.5300°S 113.4200°W	1915
Southern EPR at 18.2°S (Segment J)	−2650	−8694	18.1750°S 113.3500°W	1890
(Mexico) Northern EPR at 17°N	−2700	−8858	16.5500°N 105.3200°W	50 BCE
Southern EPR at 8°S	−2800	−9186	8.2700°S 107.9500°W	1969
Northern EPR at 10.7°N	−2900	−9514	10.7300°N 103.5800°W	2003
(United States) North Gorda Ridge Segment	−3000	−9843	42.6700°N 126.7800°W	1996
East Blanco Depression	−3000	−9843	44.2670°N 129.8790°W	Unknown
(United States) Phoenix Segment	−3000	−9843	41.4040°N 127.3800°W	Pleistocene
(United States) Jackson Segment	−3100	−10171	42.1500°N 127.0500°W	Unknown
(United States) Central Segment	−3300	−10827	41.7800°N 127.1090°W	Pleistocene
East Gakkel Ridge at 85°E	−3800	−12467	85.6080°N 85.2500°E	1999
(United States) Mariana Back-Arc Segment at 15.5°N	−4100	−13451	15.4060°N 144.5060°E	2015
Pico Fracture Zone	−4200	−13780	38.7500°N 38.0800°W	1865
Udintsev Transform	−5700	−18701	56.1530°S 143.3730°W	Unknown
(Indonesia) Olim			5.2000°N 96.1800°E	Pleistocene
(Indonesia) Geureugoh			5.1500°N 96.6700°E	Pleistocene
(Malaysia) Mostyn			4.6000°N 118.1800°E	Pleistocene
(United States) Cerro Grande			43.4500°N 112.8300°W	Pleistocene
(Iceland) Hreppar			64.4200°N 19.5000°W	Pleistocene
