= Tweedsmuir South Provincial Park =

Provincial park in British Columbia, Canada

- IUCN category II (national park)
- Location within British Columbia
- Interactive map of Tweedsmuir South Provincial Park
- Nearest city: Prince George and Bella Coola
- Coordinates: 52°31′16″N 125°54′49″W
- Area: 989,616 ha (3,820.93 sq mi)
- Designation: Class A Provincial Park
- Established: May 21, 1938
- Governing body: BC Parks

Tweedsmuir South Provincial Park is a provincial park covering parts of the eastern Kitimat Ranges, northern Pacific Ranges, and the Rainbow Range in British Columbia, Canada. It was established on May 21, 1938 in the western interior of the province, to protect its important natural features. The park hosts a variety of recreation activities for visitors. This park encompasses a range of diverse species in this park including bears, moose, and various fish. There are also a few at risk species in this park.

== First Nations ==
For the Nuxalk people, salmon from South Tweedsmuir's waterways have had significant cultural and economic importance. Salmon served, and continues to serve, as a reliable, important food source. In 2005-2015, sockeye salmon spawners in South Tweedsmuir's Atnarko River diminished in numbers from 30,000 to 2,500. In a recovery plan, made by the Nuxalk Nation, three key recovery strategies were suggested: improve general knowledge of the sockeye’s ecology, conduct a quality analysis of the river water, and synthesis of data from previous conservation measures. It is uncertain if these strategies are currently being implemented by the government.

== History ==
In 1793, British explorer Alexander Mackenzie travelled through the area of the park on his journey to the Pacific Ocean. He became the first European man to see the Pacific coast of North America, 12 years before the more famous Lewis and Clark Expedition.

=== Establishment ===
In August 1937, Governor General of Canada John Buchan, 1st Baron Tweedsmuir travelled extensively by float aircraft and horseback in the area of the park. He and his party were greatly impressed by the magnificence of its pristine wilderness, so much so that he encouraged the provincial government to preserve it.

On May 21, 1938, the Legislative Assembly of British Columbia established Tweedsmuir Provincial Park by order-in-council under the Park Act. The park covered an area of 981,000 hectares at creation, making it by far the largest provincial park in British Columbia at the time. It included most of the present day parks of Tweedsmuir South Provincial Park, Tweedsmuir North Provincial Park and Protected Area, and Entiako Provincial Park.

=== Restructuring ===
In 1956, the park boundaries were revised so that the region around the Entiako River could be opened for resource extraction. The region would again be protected under the newly established Entiako Provincial Park in 1999 and Entiako Protected Area in 2001.

Due to the difficulty of operating Tweedsmuir Provincial Park as a single park unit, it was broken up into two operating units: Tweedsmuir North Provincial Park and Tweedsmuir South Provincial Park.

== Geography ==
Tweedsmuir Park is located east of the Kitimat Ranges in the western interior of British Columbia. The park covers almost one million hectares and spans four regional districts: Bulkley-Nechako, Cariboo, Central Coast, and Mount Waddington.

The southern portion of the park is along Highway 20, approximately 400 kilometres west of Williams Lake. Access is also possible along the Discovery Coast Passage ferry and Inside Passage from Port Hardy on Vancouver Island on BC Ferries or by float plane from Nimpo Lake, Anahim Lake or Bella Coola.

=== Points of interest ===
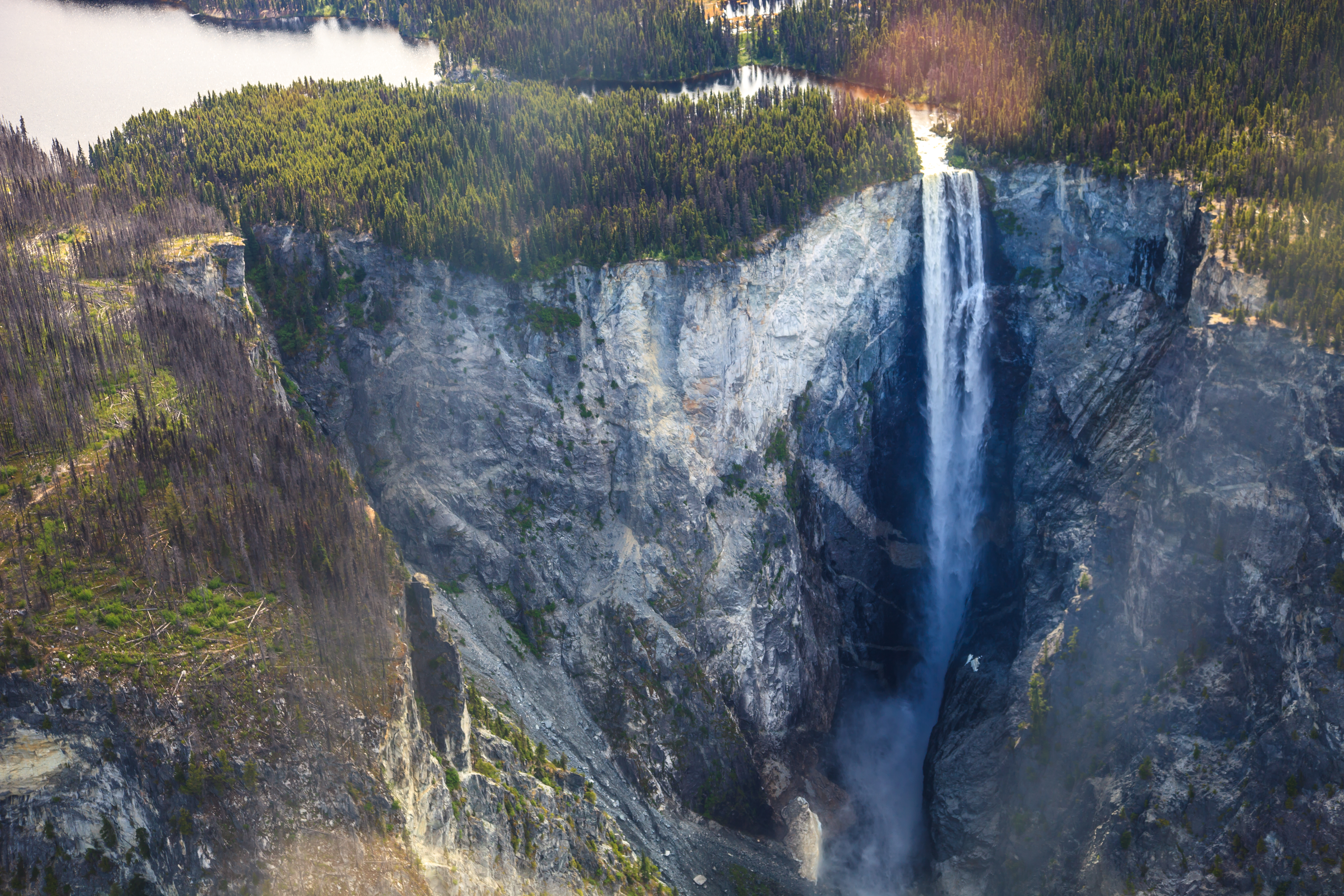
Hunlen Falls is located in the southern portion of Tweedsmuir Park

Tweedsmuir Park protects the entirety of the Rainbow Range, a collection of volcanic peaks where heavy mineralization has given the soil an array of colours. The park also protects Hunlen Falls, a 260-metre-tall (850 ft) waterfall with one of highest unbroken drops in Canada.

The park was also home to Lonesome Lake, famed for homesteader and conservationist Ralph Edwards, who worked to preserve migration habitat there for the trumpeter swan.

The Alexander MacKenzie Heritage Trail is a heritage trail that follows the routing of a historic footpath used by local First Nations for trade and travel between the coast and the interior. This trail would later be used by British explorer Alexander Mackenzie to become the first European to transit the continent by land and see the Pacific Ocean. A portion of the trail transits the park via Heckman Pass and Burnt Bridge Creek.

== Climate ==
With such a vast area the climate varies throughout the park. However in the lower regions closer to the Bella Coola Valley the temperature is warmer with a higher annual level of rainfall. Around one fifth of their annual precipitation falls as snow. Further east as the altitude climbs the weather is generally more severe and the temperature changes throughout the summer and winter are drastic. On average ranging between the minus thirties mid winter, to the higher forties during high summer.

== Ecology ==
=== Habitat and biodiversity ===
Tweedsmuir is a large provincial park that includes many different biogeoclimatic zones that include different types of trees.

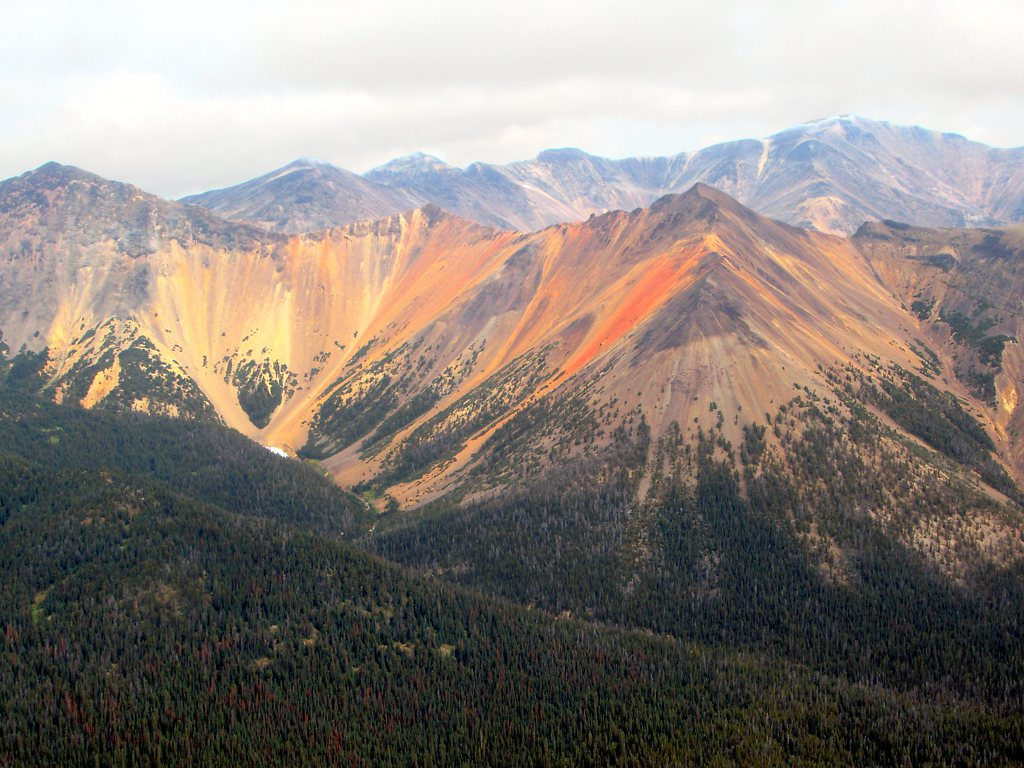
Image of the Rainbow Range in Tweedsmuir South Provincial Park.

Due to its size, the park offers a vast variety of diverse habitats. It is made up of mountains, rivers, waterfalls, lakes, plateaus and dense forests. The Eutsuk lake is notable as it divides the park into the north Tweedsmuir park and the south Tweedsmuir park. The mountains on the western edge of the park, are eroded by glaciers, and the rainbow range is made up of a series of eroded lava domes that create a multicoloured hue to the viewer, as well as providing steep canyons as crucial habitat for some of the wildlife.

Along the coast is a Hemlock Forest. At lower elevations, there is a forest that includes lodgepole pine, trembling aspen, and Douglas-fir. Engleman spruce and subalpine fir grow on the sides of some mountains.

The Rainbow Mountain Range is home to mountain goats, and there are many grizzlies and black-tailed deer that live in the valley. There are also moose and black bears present in Tweedsmuir park, although there is not much information about their population sizes. Other species that have been documented are: Red squirrels, beavers, muskrats, martens, weasels, mink, otters, lynx, wolverines, wolves, coyotes, and red foxes. There are also diverse small mammals including mice, shrews, chipmunks, voles, and lemmings.

Different fish are present at various times in the year. Observed fish populations are steelhead trout, chinook salmon, coho, cutthroat trout and dolly varden. Fishing is a popular activity in south Tweedsmuir park. These fish are a food source for the bears that inhabit the park.

=== Endangered species and conservation ===
==== The boreal woodland caribou ====
Historically, Tweedsmuir Park was inhabited by the SARA-listed woodland caribou. As of October 2021, the estimated population of caribou (Rangifer tarandus) around South Tweedsmuir Park was 160 individuals. The "Provincial Caribou Recovery Program" aims to reestablish populations in British-Columbia. Recent sightings around Tweedsmuir confirm their presence in the area.

==== The trumpeter swan ====
Due to overhunting, the trumpeter swan was near extinction in the early 20th century. The implementation of conservation efforts across North America led to the species recovery. One such example was the caretaking efforts of the Edwards Family for the swans of lonesome lake during harsh winters in the 1920s.

==== Endemic species ====
There are no species endemic to Tweedsmuir South Provincial Park. However, at least two species endemic to Canada can be found in the park. Due to the sensitivity of that information, the species cannot be disclosed publicly.

=== Threats ===
Human recreation and other disturbances are threats to Tweedsmuir South Provincial Park. However, climate change is the most prominent threat the area is facing.

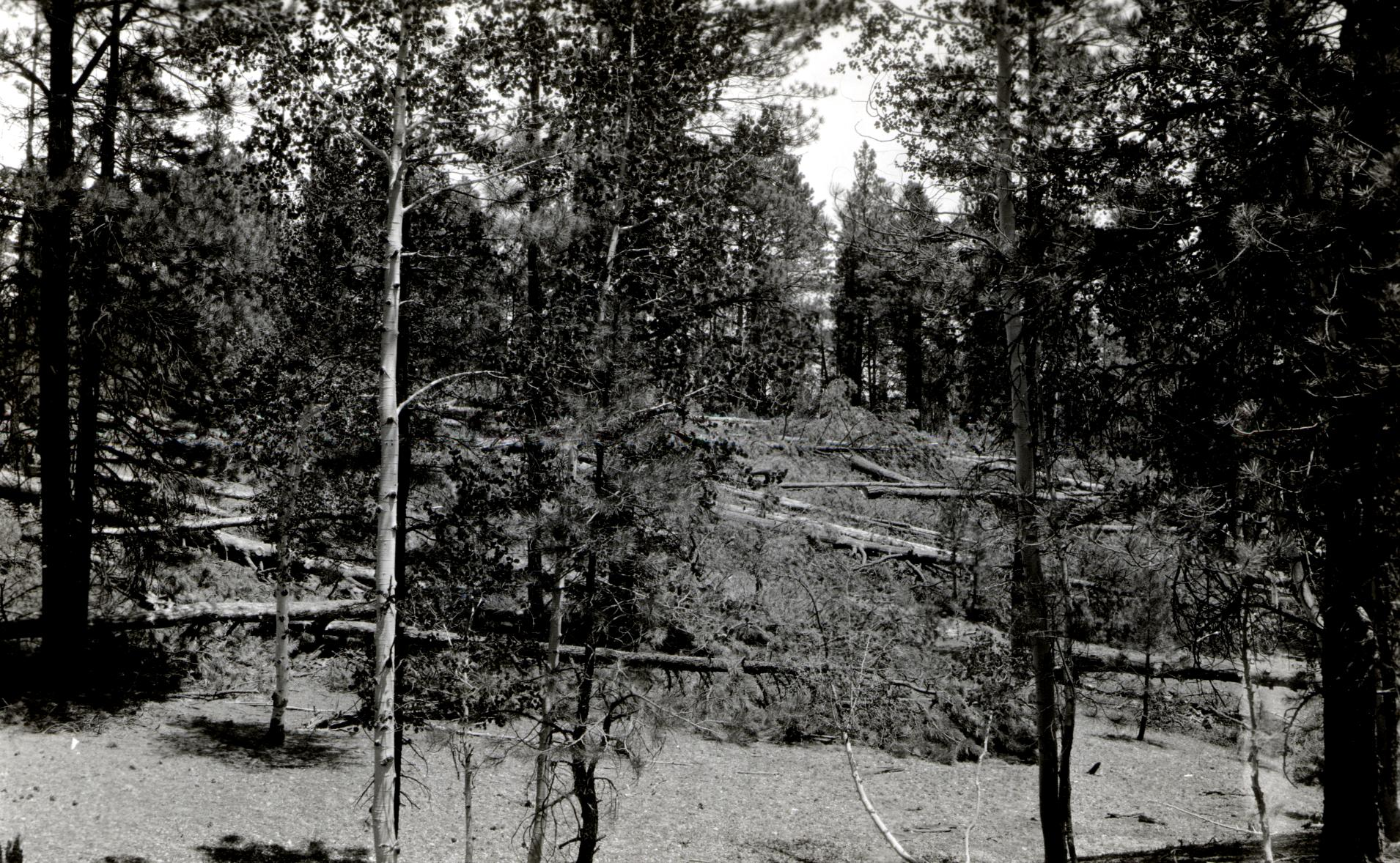

Drought conditions in the fall of 2022 significantly reduced that year's salmon population, affecting many other species depending on its survival. Floods have also been forecast, threatening drought-stricken ecosystems in BC. The park also frequently suffers mountain pine beetle infestations due to milder temperatures in winter.

== Recreation ==
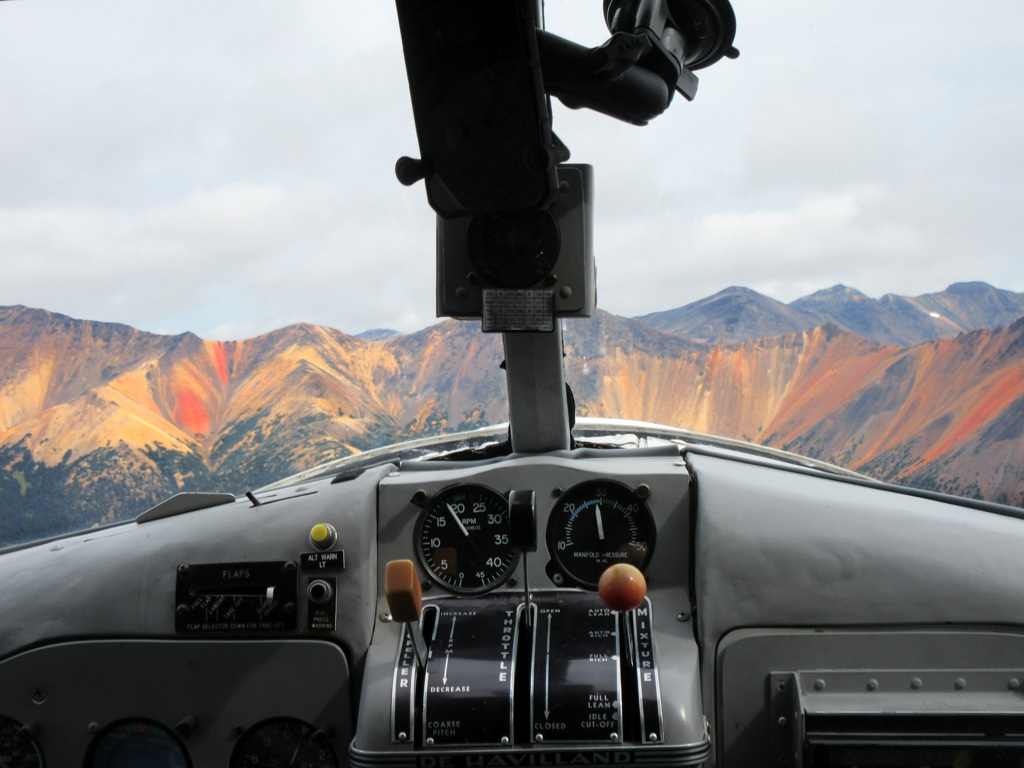
A beaver float plane used to view the rainbow range in Tweedsmuir South Provincial Park.

Tweedsmuir South Provincial Park hosts opportunities for angling, hiking, horseback riding, camping (both front-country and backcountry), and canoeing. There are two vehicle-accessible campgrounds in the park. There are also four designated picnic areas within the park. There is limited vehicle-accessible winter camping as well. The Tweedsmuir Ski Club maintains a small ski hill within the boundaries of the park with a single handle tow and cross-country ski trails. Snowmobiling is permitted within the Rainbow Range designated snowmobiling area. Swimming is not recommended in the Bella Coola and Atnarko Rivers which are located at the campgrounds.

Wildlife viewing, specifically of grizzly bears and black bears is a focus of the park in the autumn along the Atnarko River. This occurs in September when the salmon are spawning and can be found at the Belarko Wildlife viewing platform.

The main corridor through the park, along the highway, is interpreted by a series of signs developed as a partnership between BC Parks and the Nuxalk Nation. The southern portion of the park can be accessed through highway 20, by ferry, by float plane or by hiking in the backcountry.

=== Number of visitors ===
In the 2017-18 season, approximately 36,893 people visited the park. Of that, 35,763 only stayed for day use, and 1,130 visited for camping.

== See also ==
- List of British Columbia Provincial Parks
- List of protected areas of British Columbia
