= Rainbow Range (Chilcotin Plateau) =

Mountain range in British Columbia, Canada

- Rainbow Mountains
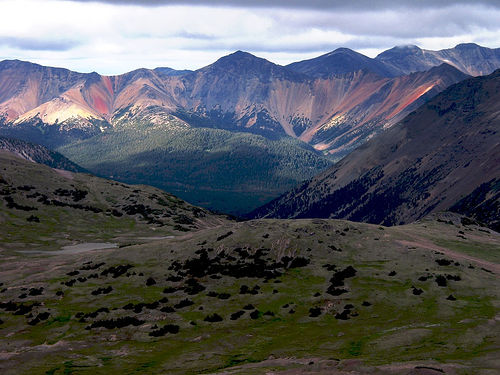
- Rainbow Range colours from heavy mineralization

Highest point
- Peak: Tsitsutl Peak
- Elevation: 2,495 m (8,186 ft)
- Coordinates: 52°43′24″N 125°46′48″W

Geography
- Country: Canada
- Province: British Columbia
- District: Range 3 Coast Land District
- Range coordinates: 52°42′59″N 125°49′05″W
- Parent range: Chilcotin Plateau
- Borders on: Pacific Ranges, Kitimat Ranges, Ilgachuz Range
- Topo map: NTS 93C12 Tusulko River

Geology
- Formed by: Shield volcano
- Orogeny: Anahim hotspot volcanism
- Rock age: 8.7 to 7.2 million years

The Rainbow Range, formerly gazetted as the Rainbow Mountains, is a mountain range in British Columbia, Canada, located 40 kilometres (25 mi) northwest of Anahim Lake. Located on the western edge of the Chilcotin Plateau, the range adjoins the Coast Mountains Pacific Ranges to the south, and the Kitimat Ranges to the north. In some classification systems it is considered part of the Coast Mountains. It lies north of the Bella Coola and Atnarko Rivers and south and west of the Dean River, which curves around its north flank, and is relatively drier in climate and easier of terrain than more mountainous areas immediately west.

Once called Tsitsutl, meaning "rainbow mountains" in the Ulkatcho dialect of the Carrier language, that name is now the name of the range's highest peak.

== Geology ==
The Rainbow Range is an eight-million-year-old (Miocene) massive peralkaline shield volcano in the Anahim Volcanic Belt which includes the lower but similar Itcha and Ilgachuz Ranges. The shield has a diameter of 30 km (19 mi) is now heavily eroded by glaciers carving into the volcanic rock and sands over millions of years. The volcanism that created the shield is not well studied and is poorly understood. It is thought to be the result of the North American Plate passing over a hotspot, similar to the one feeding the Hawaiian Islands, known as the Anahim hotspot. The only real separate volcanic peak associated with the Rainbow Range is Anahim Peak which sits on its northeast flank. Other peaks in the range are other high eroded remnants of the shield, including Beef Peak, TaiaTaeszi Peak, Mount MacKenzie and Tsitsutl Peak 2,495 m (8,186 ft), which is the highest summit of the Rainbow Range.

The range gets its name from the intense and varied colours of its terrains' volcanic lavas and sands from heavy mineralization, like the Spectrum Range in the Spatsizi Plateau.

== Tweedsmuir South Provincial Park ==
The Rainbow Range lies partly in the Tweedsmuir South Provincial Park, while to its east the Itcha and Ilgachuz Ranges form the core of the Itcha Ilgachuz Provincial Park.

== See also ==
- List of volcanoes in Canada
- Volcanism of Western Canada
- Rainbow Range (Rocky Mountains)
- Spectrum Range
