= Itcha Ilgachuz Provincial Park =

Provincial park of British Columbia

- IUCN category Ib (wilderness area)
- Location within British Columbia
- Interactive map of Itcha Ilgachuz Provincial Park
- Location: British Columbia, Canada
- Nearest city: Quesnel, British Columbia
- Coordinates: 52°42′30″N 124°59′00″W
- Area: 111,977 ha (276,700 acres)
- Established: 1995
- Governing body: BC Parks
- Website: Itcha Ilgachuz Provincial Park

Itcha Ilgachuz Provincial Park is a provincial park in the Chilcotin Country of British Columbia, Canada. The park is 111,977 hectares in size and contains Far Mountain and Mount Downton, its two most prominent peaks.

== History and conservation ==
Established in 1995 the park was recommended for protection under the Cariboo-Chilcotin Land-Use Plan, and designated a Class A Park.

Itcha Ilgachuz protects alpine grasslands, wetlands, and wildlife habitat. The Itcha Range and Ilgachuz Range are shield volcanoes that formed 5 and 2.5 million years ago as the North American Plate drifted over the Anahim hotspot. These ranges are situated in the rain shadow of the Coast Mountains, and support a high diversity of plant and animal species including woodland caribou.

== Recreation ==
The park has a network of unmaintained trails for hikers or equestrian users. One trail is open to mountain biking. Wilderness backcountry camping and fishing or hunting (with a license) are permitted. Fish habitat is limited by steep terrain, with Itcha Lake supporting populations of rainbow trout and bull trout.

In winter, a network of snowmobile trails and play areas is available that avoids the preferred winter range of the woodland caribou.

== Location ==
The park is north of BC Highway 20 near the community of Anahim Lake. There are no roads in the park.
