= Range 3 Coast Land District =

Land district in British Columbia, Canada

Coordinates: 52°25′N 126°25′W

Range 3 Coast Land District is one of the 59 land districts of British Columbia, Canada, which are part of the cadastral divisions of British Columbia.

== Islands ==
- Campbell Island
- Lady Douglas Island
- Lake Island
- Price Island
- Swindle Island

== Mountains ==
- Kitasu Hill
- Helmet Peak

== Settlements ==
- Anahim Lake
- Bella Bella
- Bella Coola
- Chezacut
- Chilanko Forks
- Hagensborg
- Klemtu
- Ocean Falls
- Shearwater
- Towdystan
