= 2010 Mount Meager landslide =

2010 landslide in British Columbia, Canada

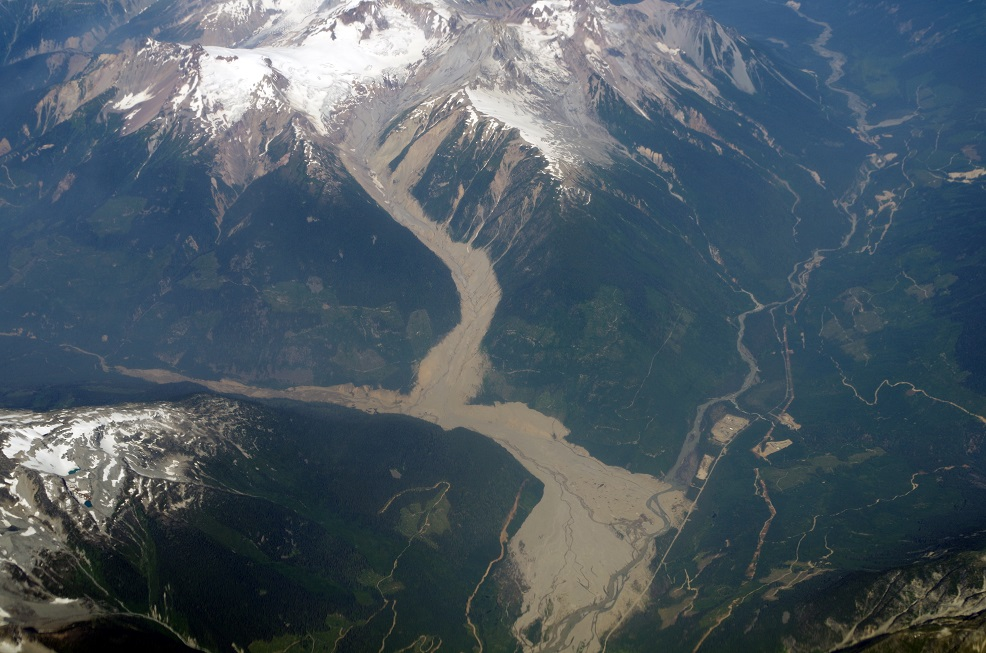
- The 2010 Mount Meager landslide in 2014
- Date: August 6, 2010
- Time: 3:27 a.m. PDT
- Location: British Columbia, Canada; 50°37′22″N 123°30′03″W
- Type: Rockslide/debris flow
- Cause: Slope failure
- Deaths: None
- Injuries: None
- Property damage: C$10 million

The 2010 Mount Meager landslide was a large catastrophic debris avalanche that occurred in southwestern British Columbia, Canada, on August 6 at 3:27 a.m. PDT (UTC-7). More than 45,000,000 m^{3} (1.6×10^{9} ft^{3}) of debris slid down Mount Meager, temporarily blocking Meager Creek and destroying local bridges, roads and equipment. It was one of the largest landslides in Canadian history and one of over 20 landslides to have occurred from the Mount Meager massif in the last 10,000 years.

Although voluminous, there were no fatalities caused by the event due in part to its remote and uninhabited location. The landslide was large enough to send seismic waves more than 2,000 km (1,200 mi) away into the neighbouring U.S. states of Alaska and Washington and beyond. Multiple factors led to the slide: Mount Meager's weak slopes have left it in a constant state of instability.

== Background ==
Mount Meager, located 150 km (93 mi) north of Vancouver, is a peak of the Mount Meager massif. This is a group of coalescent stratovolcanoes and the largest volcanic centre in the Garibaldi Volcanic Belt. It comprises about 20 km^{3} (4.8 mi^{3}) of eruptive rocks that were deposited during four distinct eruptive periods, the first beginning 2.2 million years ago. During the present period (beginning 150,000 years ago), it has erupted more than five times, producing ash falls, pyroclastic flows, lava flows and lahars. The only identified Holocene eruption was in about 410 BC and created a diverse sequence of volcanic deposits well exposed along the Lillooet River. This is the most recent major explosive eruption in British Columbia, as well as the largest known Holocene explosive eruption in Canada.

The massif has been a source of large volcanic debris flows for the last 8,000 years, many of which have reached several tens of kilometres downstream in the Lillooet River valley. It is arguably the most unstable mountain massif in Canada and may also be its most active landslide area. The earliest identified Holocene landslide was in 7900 BP and further landslides occurred in 6250 BP, 5250 BP, 4400 BP, 2600 BP, 2400 BP, 2240 BP, 2170 BP, 1920 BP, 1860 BP, 870 BP, 800 BP, 630 BP, 370 BP, 210 BP, 150 BP and in 1931, 1947, 1972, 1975, 1984, 1986 and 1998. These events were attributed to structurally weak volcanic rocks, glacial unloading, recent explosive volcanism and Little Ice Age glacial activity.

== Landslide ==
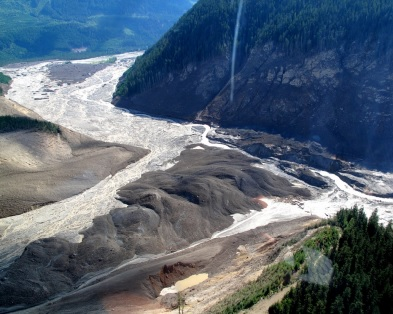
The Meager Creek barrier after the dam outburst flood at the confluence of Capricorn and Meager creeks.

At 3:27 a.m. PDT on August 6, 2010, the southern 2,554 m (8,379 ft) peak of Mount Meager collapsed in a series of major rockfalls. The rockfalls fell approximately 500 m (1,600 ft) onto Meager's weak and heavily saturated south flank where they destabilized a significant volume of material, forming a highly mobile, very rapid debris flow. The debris flow travelled the entire 7 km (4.3 mi) length of Capricorn Creek then inundated both the Meager Creek and Lillooet River valleys. Meager Creek was dammed for about 19 hours during which time water had built up behind the dam to create a 1.5 km (0.93 mi) long lake. The landslide dam ultimately failed into the Lillooet River valley, releasing roughly 2,650,000 m^{3} (94,000,000 ft^{3}) of water towards Pemberton with an average velocity of approximately 2.5 m/s (8.2 ft/s). No deaths or injuries were associated with the event.

A study conducted by Guthrie et al. (2012) concluded that groundwater played a key role in the collapse. Prior to failure the flanks of Meager were subject to high pore water pressures indicated by extensive surface seepage observed throughout the failure surface and along lateral shears following the 2010 event. The largest visible bedrock spring occurred along the west lateral scarp and was the location of at least two previous landslides, occurring in 1998 and 2009. Water supply was exacerbated by summer melt of snow and ice, causing even greater saturation of slopes.

With a volume of approximately 48,500,000 m^{3} (1.71×10^{9} ft^{3}), the 2010 landslide was comparable in volume to the 1965 Hope Slide, making it one of the largest in Canadian history. The landslide consisted mainly of intrusive porphyritic rhyodacite, lava flows and breccia derived from the Capricorn and Plinth assemblages, which are the most recently formed geological formations comprising the Mount Meager massif.

=== Impact ===
Despite the remote location of the landslide, the event had considerable socioeconomic impact. Approximately 110,000 m^{3} (3,900,000 ft^{3}) of wood was stripped away from the slopes of Capricorn Creek and Meager Creek and the Lillooet River valley bottom and either pulverized into fine organic material or transported as large woody debris into the river system. The wood was a mixture of western hemlock, amabilis and subalpine firs, western red cedar and to a lesser extent lodgepole pine and balsam poplar. The total potential loss based on the markets at the time of the event was C$8.7 million. In addition, road construction equipment and two forest service bridges were destroyed, along with several kilometres of roads including almost 6 km (3.7 mi) of the Meager Creek forest service road.

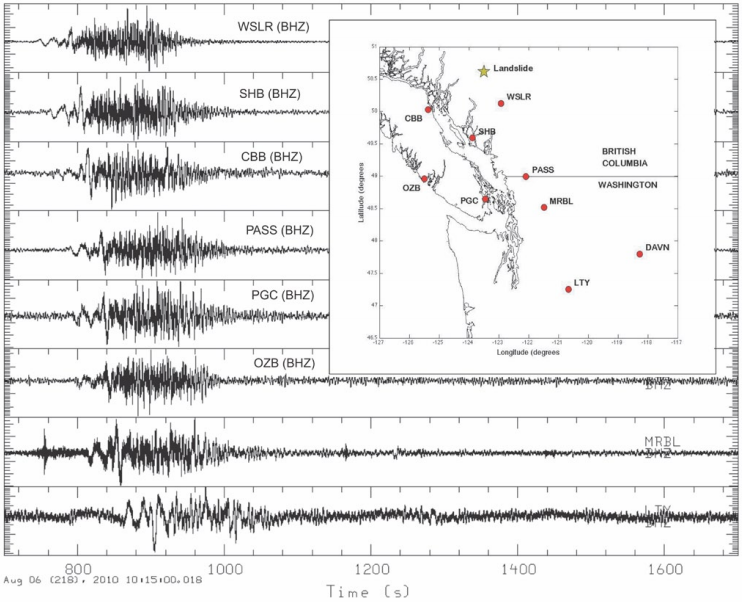
Raw seismic signals from 2010 Mount Meager landslide recorded across southwestern British Columbia and northern Washington. Station and landslide location indicated on inset map.

The landslide and the subsequent threat of a dam outburst flood on Meager Creek caused the evacuation of approximately 1,500 residents in the lower Lillooet River valley for one night and rescue efforts for several campers and workers in the vicinity of Mount Meager. Sediment moving downstream puts pressure on the Pemberton district diking system, raising the effective flood levels. The obliteration of Capricorn Creek and inundation of Meager Creek will have long-lasting environmental effects. In total, direct costs associated with the event were estimated at C$10 million. If gravel removal or dike elevation changes become necessary as a result of the increased sediment load, the total long-term costs of this landslide could exceed the direct costs.

=== Seismic signature ===
The landslide generated long-period seismic waves that were visible at seismograph stations from southern California to northern Alaska, up to 2,800 km (1,700 mi) away. No known earthquake was associated with the failure, but the event itself was assigned an equivalent local magnitude of 2.6 by the Canadian National Seismograph Network.

Landslides do not always generate identifiable seismic signatures due in part to their slower source process and poor ground coupling as compared to earthquakes. Seismic energy conversion rates for similar events are estimated to be as low as 0.01% of the kinetic energy and 1% of the potential energy released by the slide. It requires an extremely energetic source to generate waves high enough in amplitude to be visible for thousands of kilometres. The seismogenic nature of this landslide was a result of the large volume of material involved and the extremely rapid velocities.

== Eyewitnesses ==
Four people witnessed the event and were in extreme jeopardy on several occasions during and immediately following the landslide. K. Kraliz, J. Duffy, J. Tilley and P. Smith arrived at upper Lillooet forest campsite at 3:25 a.m. PDT and began unloading their gear. They were surprised by "two large cracks" (loud explosive noises, not physical cracks in the ground) occurring in quick succession, followed by a rumbling that initially sounded like a train or a forest fire, but that grew to a deafening volume in about 20 seconds. All four campers got back into their truck and headed for higher ground. Chaos ensued for the next few hours before daylight as they encountered debris flows, mud, falling trees and other hazards at the edge of the landslide deposit in the Lillooet River valley.

Perhaps the most alarming part of their story occurred as they came face to face with a 1.5 m (4.9 ft) high wall of mud and water that appeared to them like a "turbulent bubbling wedge of black oil". They turned their truck around, but not before they were overtaken by the hyperconcentrated flow. Accelerating rapidly, they nonetheless escaped, in what P. Smith described as most resembling "the Millennium Falcon escaping the Death Star explosion at the end of Return of the Jedi". The two large cracks heard by the witnesses may have been caused by the impact of Meager's failed secondary peak.

== Significance ==
The 2010 landslide is significant for seven reasons:

1. It was the tenth mass flow involving volumes in excess of 500,000 m^{3} (18,000,000 ft^{3}) to have occurred at the Mount Meager massif since 1850 and the sixth largest mass flow identified at the volcano over the Holocene.
2. It was one of the largest landslides to have occurred worldwide since 1945.
3. The landslide exhibited dramatic transformation from an initial rock slope failure to a rapidly moving debris flow as a result of the high degree of fragmentation of the initial failure mass.
4. The formation of a significant landslide dam illustrated the importance of landslide damming as a secondary landslide process and as a hazard to distant downstream communities.
5. The seismic trace of the landslide initiation and motion allowed detailed reconstruction of the stages and velocity of movement.
6. The event demonstrated the role of rapid post-Little Ice Age deglaciation in destabilizing slopes adjacent to modern glaciers.
7. It represented a unique opportunity to consider hazard and risk from catastrophic failures to mountain communities.

The event illustrated the extreme landslide hazard of glacier-clad dissected Quaternary volcanic centres, which results from the existence of steep slopes in poor quality rock (reflecting such factors as hydrothermal alteration and heterogeneity of volcanic products). In this geological environment, landslides are a major process of denudation and, through transformation into debris flows, deliver large volumes of debris to river systems.

== See also ==
- List of landslides
- Hope Slide
- Frank Slide
