= Mount Meager =

Mount Meager may refer to:

- Mount Meager massif, a group of mountains in British Columbia, Canada
- Mount Meager (British Columbia), a mountain of the above massif

== See also ==
- Meager (disambiguation)
