= The Devastator Assemblage =

Geological formation

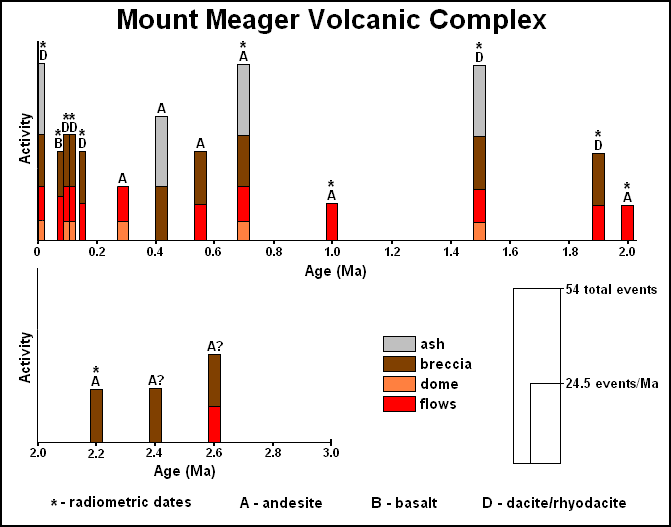
Histogram showing the eruptive history of the Mount Meager massif. The eruptive period that created The Devastator Assemblage is shown as a rectangle between 1.4 and 1.6 Ma.

The Devastator Assemblage is a geological formation comprising a portion of the Mount Meager massif in southwestern British Columbia, Canada. It is named after Devastator Peak (also known as The Devastator), the lowest and southernmost subsidiary peak of Meager. The south and west flanks of Pylon Peak and Devastator Peak are made of The Devastator Assemblage rocks.

This 500 m (1,600 ft) thick rock unit was formed during a period of volcanic activity between 1,900,000 and 500,000 years ago. It consists of subvolcanic intrusions of a partly preserved volcanic vent and felsic volcanic rocks that were erupted from the vent. The eastern portion of The Devastator Assemblage comprises the partly preserved vent and felsic volcanic rocks while the western portion consists of crudely layered tephra.

== See also ==
- Capricorn Assemblage
- Job Assemblage
- List of Cascade volcanoes
- List of volcanoes in Canada
- Mosaic Assemblage
- Plinth Assemblage
- Pylon Assemblage
- Volcanology of Western Canada
