= Perkin's Pillar =

- Location within British Columbia

Highest point
- Elevation: 2,430 m (7,970 ft)
- Prominence: 70 m (230 ft)
- Coordinates: 50°37′49.0″N 123°31′17.0″W

Geography
- Location: British Columbia, Canada
- District: Lillooet Land District
- Parent range: Pacific Ranges
- Topo map: NTS 92J12 Mount Dalgleish

Geology
- Mountain type: Volcanic plug
- Volcanic arc: Canadian Cascade Arc
- Volcanic belt: Garibaldi Volcanic Belt

Climbing
- First ascent: Saturday July 06, 2002 Tim Bennet; Ivan Bandic; Fred Touche

Perkin's Pillar was a vertical pillar of volcanic rock of the Mount Meager massif in southwestern British Columbia, Canada. It existed on the steep north flank of Capricorn Mountain. The upper half of Perkin's Pillar collapsed sometime in June 2005 and only a jagged sliver remains of the previously mighty summit.

== See also ==
- Cascade Volcanoes
- Garibaldi Volcanic Belt
- Volcanism in Canada
- List of volcanoes in Canada
