= Capricorn Assemblage =

Geological formation in British Columbia, Canada

The Capricorn Assemblage, also known as the Capricorn Formation, is a geological formation comprising the central portion of the Mount Meager massif in southwestern British Columbia, Canada. It is named after Capricorn Mountain, the third highest subsidiary peak of Meager. The assemblage was formed during a period of volcanic activity about or less than 90,000 years ago.

Weathered rhyodacite is the main volcanic rock comprising the Capricorn Assemblage. It forms the final 600 m (2,000 ft) of Capricorn Mountain and Mount Job. The rhyodacite is characterized by phenocrysts of plagioclase, quartz and biotite. Capricorn Assemblage rhyodacite underlies Plinth Assemblage rhyodacite on the south flank of Plinth Peak.

== See also ==
- Mosaic Assemblage
- Job Assemblage
- The Devastator Assemblage
- Pylon Assemblage
- Volcanism of Western Canada
- List of Cascade volcanoes
- List of volcanoes in Canada
