= Pylon Assemblage =

Accreted igneous terrain in the country of Canada

The Pylon Assemblage is an accreted terrane of igneous rocks in southwestern British Columbia, Canada, located about 150 km (93 mi) north of Vancouver. It is named after Pylon Peak, a summit of the Mount Meager massif. Two units make up the Pylon Assemblage, although the youngest unit comprises nearly 100% of the assemblage.

On the southern flank of Pylon Peak, the oldest unit consists of andesitic lava flows. It locally overlies The Devastator Assemblage and older basal breccia. Porphyritic plagioclase andesite of the youngest unit underlies much of the southern and western portions of Meager. Devastator Peak, a volcanic plug at the southern end of the Meager massif, was the source for these lava flows between 1,000,000 and 500,000 years ago. The Pylon Assemblage represents the largest geological formation comprising Meager.

== See also ==
- Mosaic Assemblage
- Job Assemblage
- Capricorn Assemblage
- Plinth Assemblage
- Volcanism of Western Canada
- List of Cascade volcanoes
- List of volcanoes in Canada
