= Job Assemblage =

The Job Assemblage is a geological formation comprising a portion of the Mount Meager massif in southwestern British Columbia, Canada. It is named after Mount Job, a subsidiary peak of Meager. The rock unit was formed during a period of rhyodacite volcanism during the Pleistocene epoch.

Around Mount Job, rhyodacite contains hornblende, biotite and quartz. On the east side of the Affliction Glacier, rhyodacite of the Job Assemblage overlies porphyritic andesite of the older Pylon Assemblage. The more recently formed Capricorn Assemblage overlies the Job Assemblage at the head of Affiction Glacier and Capricorn Glacier.

== See also ==
- List of Cascade volcanoes
- List of volcanoes in Canada
- Mosaic Assemblage
- Plinth Assemblage
- The Devastator Assemblage
- Volcanology of Western Canada
