= Pebble Creek Formation =

Volcanic formation in British Columbia, Canada

Pebble Creek Formation is a volcanic formation in the Garibaldi Volcanic Belt created when the Mount Meager massif erupted about 2,350 years ago and by two rock avalanche deposits.

The two rock avalanches are not linked with the 2,350 BP eruption, although the post-eruption avalanche may have its causes in the over-steepened slopes produced by the explosive period of the eruption.

The rocks of the Pebble Creek Formation are the youngest known of the Mount Meager volcanic complex, and are made of dacite.

The formation includes a dacite lava flow, pyroclastic flows, lahars and fallout pumice.

Pebble Creek Hot Springs is increasingly popular after access to Meager Creek Hot Springs has been restricted post slide.
