= Goosenest =

Volcano in California

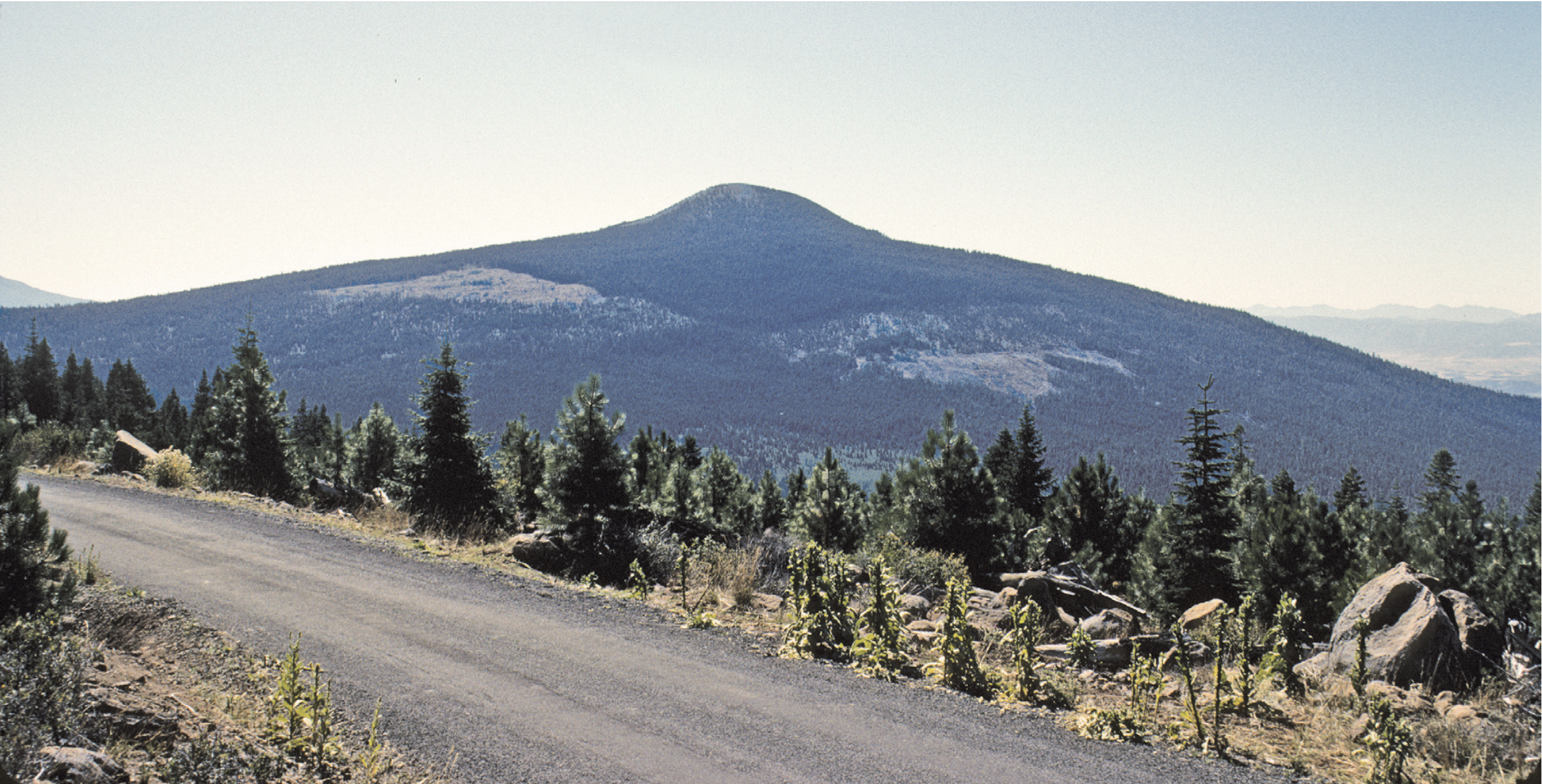

Highest point
- Elevation: 2,528 m (8,294 ft)
- Coordinates: 41°43′19″N 122°13′12″W

Geography

Geology
- Mountain type: Shield volcano
- Volcanic arc: Cascades Volcanic Arc
- Last eruption: Pleistocene

Goosenest is a shield volcano topped by a pyroclastic cone at its summit located in the Cascades of northern California. The area is near Mount Shasta, and represents one of the region's short-lived shield volcanoes, although Goosenest is a larger and longer-lived example. Its volcanic edifice comprises basaltic to basaltic andesitic lava flows, a rare feature for the area. The volcano has a volume of 10 km^{3} (2.4 cu mi) and produced lava flows covering 60 km^{2} (23 sq mi).
