= Plinth Peak =

Volcanic peak in the country of Canada

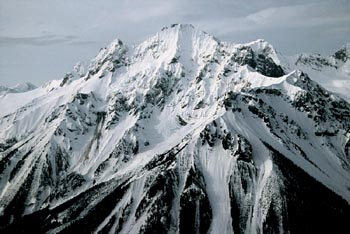
- North face of Plinth Peak

Highest point
- Elevation: 2,677 m (8,783 ft)
- Prominence: 947 m (3,107 ft)
- Coordinates: 50°38′42.7″N 123°30′38.9″W

Geography
- Location within British Columbia
- Location: British Columbia, Canada
- District: Lillooet Land District
- Parent range: Pacific Ranges
- Topo map: NTS 92J12 Mount Dalgleish

Geology
- Rock age: Pleistocene
- Mountain type: Stratovolcano
- Volcanic arc: Canadian Cascade Arc
- Volcanic belt: Garibaldi Volcanic Belt
- Last eruption: Pleistocene

Climbing
- First ascent: 1931 N. Carter; A. Dalgleish; T. Fyles; M. Winram
- Easiest route: rock/ice climb

Plinth Peak, sometimes called Plinth Mountain, is the highest satellite cone of the Mount Meager massif, and one of four overlapping volcanic cones which together form a large volcanic complex in the Garibaldi Volcanic Belt of the Canadian Cascade Arc. It is one of the most recently formed volcanic formations of the Mount Meager massif.

Plinth Peak is the highest volcanic peak of the Mount Meager massif. Located on the steep north flank of Plinth is the remnant of an inner crater wall that was destroyed by a lateral blast during a period of volcanic activity about 2,350 years ago.

== See also ==
- List of volcanoes in Canada
- List of Cascade volcanoes
- Devastator Peak
- Pylon Peak
- Capricorn Mountain
- Mount Job
- Plinth Assemblage
- Volcanism of Western Canada
- Geology of the Pacific Northwest
