= Plinth (disambiguation) =

Plinth may refer to:

- Plinth, a base especially for statues, steles, etc.
- Plinth (hieroglyph), an Egyptian language hieroglyph
- Plinth Peak, of the Cascade Volcanic Arc
