= Meager =

Meager or Meagre may refer to:

== People ==
- James Meager (born 1986 or 1987), New Zealand politician
- Lee Meager (born 1978), British former professional boxer

== Other uses ==
- Mount Meager (British Columbia), Canada
- Meager Creek, British Columbia, Canada
- Meagre, Argyrosomus regius, a fish

== See also ==
- Meagre set (also meager set) in mathematics
- Brown meagre, Sciaena umbra, a fish
- Meager sedge, Carex exilis, a plant species
