= Mosaic Assemblage =

Geologic formation in Canada

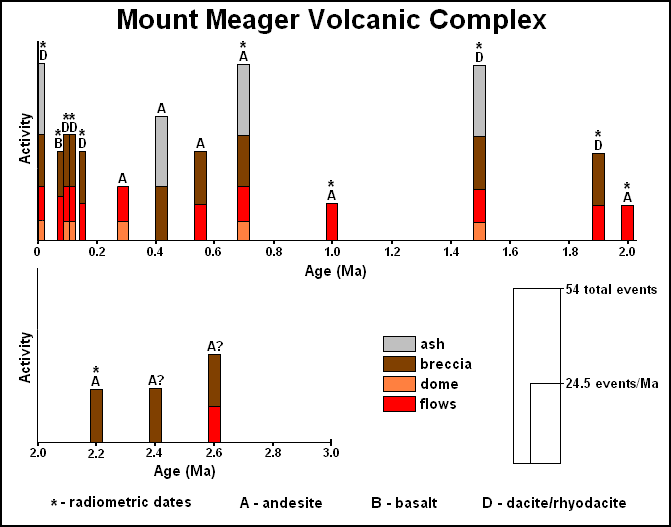
Histogram showing the eruptive history of the Mount Meager massif. The eruptive period that created the Mosaic Assemblage is shown as B on the first row.

The Mosaic Assemblage is a rock unit of the Pacific Ranges of the Coast Mountains in southwestern British Columbia, Canada. It is the namesake of Mosaic Glacier, which is drained by Mosaic Creek. This geological formation formed 140,000 to less than 90,000 years ago when porphyritic plagioclase-augite-olivine basalt and trachybasalt was erupted in valleys and on mountain ridges. These volcanic rocks form scoriaceous lava flows, breccias, volcanic bombs and pillow lavas.

The location of the Mosaic Assemblage is sparse, being present just north of the Lillooet River, south of and in upper Meager Creek and between Job Creek and Mosaic Creek. Because these four areas are well apart, each area probably has its own volcanic vents. Small patches of the Mosaic Assemblage overlie The Devastator Assemblage and form minor portions of the Mount Meager massif.

== See also ==
- Job Assemblage
- Plinth Assemblage
- Capricorn Assemblage
- Pylon Assemblage
- Volcanism of Western Canada
- List of Cascade volcanoes
- List of volcanoes in Canada
