= Upper Lillooet Provincial Park =

Provincial park in British Columbia

- IUCN category II (national park)
- Location within British Columbia
- Interactive map of Upper Lillooet Provincial Park
- Location: British Columbia, Canada
- Nearest city: Pemberton
- Coordinates: 50°40′59″N 123°36′59″W
- Area: 199.96 km^{2} (77.20 sq mi)
- Established: July 23, 1997
- Governing body: BC Parks

Upper Lillooet Provincial Park is a provincial park in British Columbia, Canada. The 19,996-hectare park was established on July 28, 1997, under the National Parks Act.

== See also ==
- Mount Meager massif
- Lillooet River
