= Plinth Assemblage =

Stratigraphic unit in British Columbia, Canada

Coordinates: 50°38′42.7″N 123°30′38.9″W

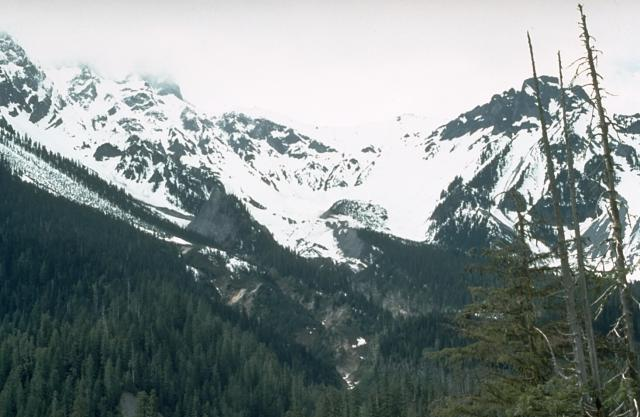
The northeastern flank of Plinth Peak displaying rocks of the Plinth Assemblage. Also shown is the inconspicuous ice and debris covered Bridge River Vent crater in the middle of the photo.

The Plinth Assemblage, also known as the Plinth Formation, is an accreted terrane of igneous rocks in southwestern British Columbia, Canada, located just north of the Lillooet River and on the northern flank of the Mount Meager massif. It is named after Plinth Peak, a peak made of Plinth Assemblage rocks.

This geological formation is one of the largest comprising the Mount Meager massif. Formed during an onset of volcanic activity about 100,000 years ago, the Plinth Assemblage consists of light grey porphyritic rhyodacite with phenocrysts of plagioclase, quartz, minor biotite and rare hornblende. The 600 m (2,000 ft) of Mount Meager itself is made of Plinth Assemblage rocks and was the southern source of Plinth Assemblage lava flows and breccias.

The Plinth Assemblage represents a minor portion of the Pacific Ranges of the southern Coast Mountains.

== See also ==
- Job Assemblage
- Mosaic Assemblage
- Capricorn Assemblage
- The Devastator Assemblage
- Pylon Assemblage
- Volcanism of Western Canada
- List of Cascade volcanoes
- List of volcanoes in Canada
