= 1975 Devastation Glacier landslide =

Natural disaster in British Columbia, Canada

Coordinates: 50.58°N 123.52°W

The 1975 Devastation Glacier landslide was a massive rock avalanche that originated from Devastation Glacier on the southern flank of the Mount Meager massif on July 22, 1975. It had a volume of 13,000,000 m^{3} (460,000,000 cu ft) and buried and killed a group of four geologists at the confluence of Devastation Creek and Meager Creek.
