= Devastator Peak =

Summit in Canada

- Location within British Columbia
- Interactive map of Devastator Peak

Highest point
- Elevation: 2,327 m (7,635 ft)
- Prominence: 67 m (220 ft)
- Coordinates: 50°35′34″N 123°31′51″W

Geography
- Location: British Columbia, Canada
- District: Lillooet Land District
- Parent range: Pacific Ranges
- Topo map: NTS 92J12 Mount Dalgleish

Geology
- Rock age: Pliocene
- Mountain type: Volcanic plug
- Volcanic arc: Canadian Cascade Arc
- Volcanic belt: Garibaldi Volcanic Belt
- Last eruption: Pleistocene

Climbing
- First ascent: 1931 N. Carter; A. Dalgleish; T. Fyles; M. Winram

Devastator Peak, also known as The Devastator, is the lowest and southernmost of the six subsidiary peaks that form the Mount Meager massif in southwestern British Columbia, Canada. It is located 55 km (34 mi) west of Bralorne.

== Geology ==
Devastator Peak is a dissected andesitic volcanic plug, which was part of a larger structure of Mount Meager, but parts eroded away, leaving Devastator Peak. Like the rest of the Mount Meager massif, it is part of the Garibaldi Volcanic Belt which is a segment of the Cascade Volcanic Arc, but it is not within the geographic boundary of the Cascade Range.

Devastator Peak was the source for a thick sequence of andesite lava flows that occurred 0.5-1.0 million years ago. Erosional remnants of these flows form the stratified crags of Pylon Peak. The slopes of the peak are highly unstable, consisting of weak, hydrothermally altered felsic rocks. There have been many recent debris flows which have flowed down into the Meager Creek drainage.

== See also ==
- List of volcanoes in Canada
- Garibaldi Volcanic Belt
- Cascade Volcanoes
- Volcanism in Canada
