= Hyperconcentrated flow =

A hyperconcentrated flow is a two-phase flowing mixture of water and sediment in a channel which has properties intermediate between fluvial flow and debris flow. Large quantities of sand may be transported throughout the flow column, but the transport of suspended and bedload sediment along the channel depends on flow turbulence and high flow velocities, and coarser sediment remains as bedload. Hyperconcentrated flows do not show the characteristics of non-Newtonian flow typical of debris flows, e.g., levees, coarsening up or matrix supported deposits.

Hyperconcentrated flows may contain anywhere from 5–60 % sediment by volume. Higher concentrations tend to be characteristic of debris flows, less of normal fluvial flow.
