= Matrix-supported rock =

In geology, a matrix-supported rock is a sedimentary rock of which a defined majority is the fine-grained matrix as opposed to the clasts (in the case of a conglomerate) or allochems (in the case of a limestone). For a conglomerate, a rock is considered matrix-supported when clasts constitute less than 15% of its volume. Matrix support is considered characteristic of debris flow deposits, in which clasts are supported within a fabric of mud as they move downstream. Wackestones and mudstones under the Dunham classification of limestones are also considered matrix-supported due to the predominance of micrite (as opposed to, for example, macrofossils).
