= Mount Meager massif =

Group of volcanoes in British Columbia, Canada

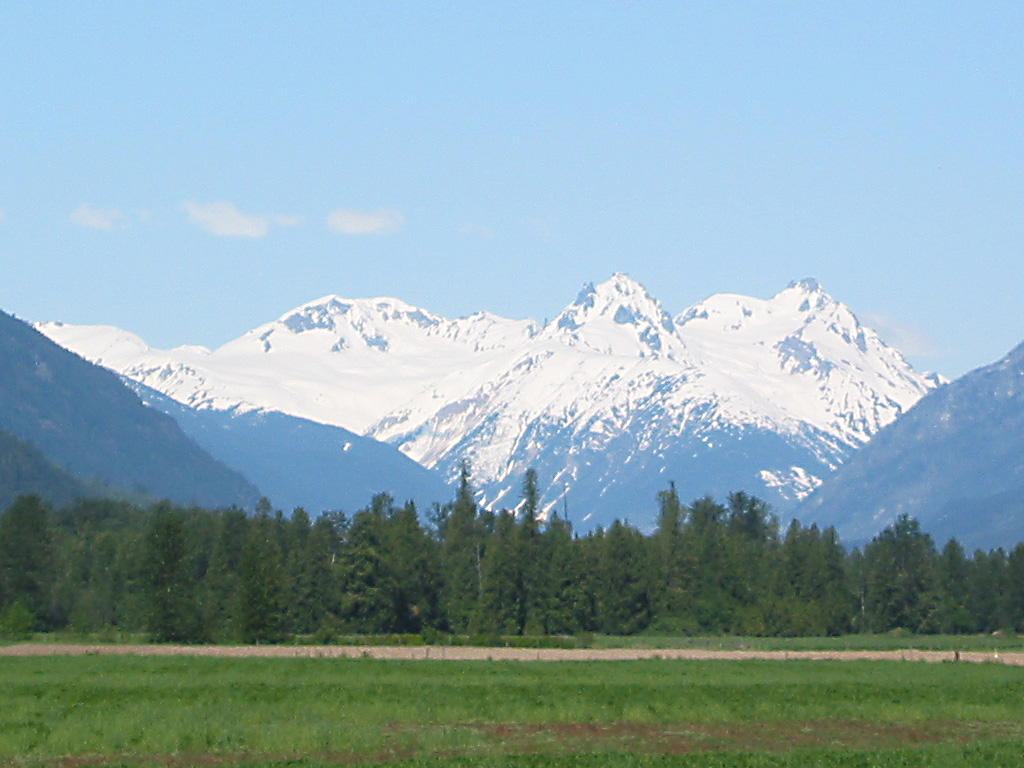
- The Mount Meager massif as seen from the east near Pemberton. Summits left to right are Capricorn Mountain, Mount Meager and Plinth Peak.

Highest point
- Peak: Plinth Peak
- Elevation: 2,680 m (8,790 ft)
- Coordinates: 50°40′0″N 123°31′0″W

Dimensions
- Length: 13 km (8.1 mi)
- Width: 9 km (5.6 mi)
- Volume: 20 km^{3} (4.8 mi^{3})

Geography
- Location within British Columbia
- Country: Canada
- Province: British Columbia
- District: Lillooet Land District
- Range coordinates: 50°38′N 123°03′W
- Parent range: Pacific Ranges
- Topo map: NTS 92J12 Mount Dalgleish

Geology
- Formed by: Complex volcano
- Volcanic arc: Canadian Cascade Arc
- Volcanic belt: Garibaldi Volcanic Belt
- Last eruption: 410 BCE ± 200 years

The Mount Meager massif is a group of volcanic peaks in the Pacific Ranges of the Coast Mountains in southwestern British Columbia, Canada. Part of the Cascade Volcanic Arc of western North America, it is located 150 km (93 mi) north of Vancouver at the northern end of the Pemberton Valley and reaches a maximum elevation of 2,680 m (8,790 ft). The massif is capped by several eroded volcanic edifices, including lava domes, volcanic plugs and overlapping piles of lava flows; these form at least six major summits including Mount Meager which is the second highest of the massif.

The Garibaldi Volcanic Belt (GVB) has a long history of eruptions and poses a threat to the surrounding region. Any volcanic hazard ranging from landslides to eruptions could pose a significant risk to humans and wildlife. Although the massif has not erupted for more than 2,000 years, it could produce a major eruption; if this were to happen, relief efforts would be quickly organized. Teams such as the Interagency Volcanic Event Notification Plan (IVENP) are prepared to notify people threatened by volcanic eruptions in Canada.

The Mount Meager massif produced the largest volcanic eruption in Canada in the last 10,000 years. About 2,400 years ago, an explosive eruption formed a volcanic crater on its northeastern flank and sent avalanches of hot ash, rock fragments and volcanic gases down the northern flank of the volcano. Evidence for more recent volcanic activity has been documented at the volcano, such as hot springs and earthquakes. The Mount Meager massif has also been the source of several large landslides in the past, including a massive debris flow in 2010 that swept down Meager Creek and the Lillooet River.

== Geography and geology ==
=== Regional geography ===
The Mount Meager massif lies in the Coast Mountains, which extend from Vancouver to the Alaskan Panhandle for 1,600 km (990 mi). It is about 300 km (190 mi) wide, cut by fjords, narrow inlets with steep cliffs created by glacial erosion. The Coast Mountains have a profound effect on British Columbia's climate. Lying just east of the Pacific Ocean, they shear off moisture-laden air coming off the ocean, causing heavy rainfall on their western slopes. This precipitation is among the most extreme in North America, feeding lush forests on the mountain range's western slopes.

Valleys surrounding the massif contain old-growth forests. The area also features wetland habitats, plants of the cottonwood-willow-thimbleberry association and glaucous willowherbs. Wildlife such as wolves, wolverine, moose, raptors, black-tailed deer, mountain goats and waterfowl inhabit the area as well as grizzly and black bears.

=== Regional geomorphology ===
==== Garibaldi Volcanic Belt ====
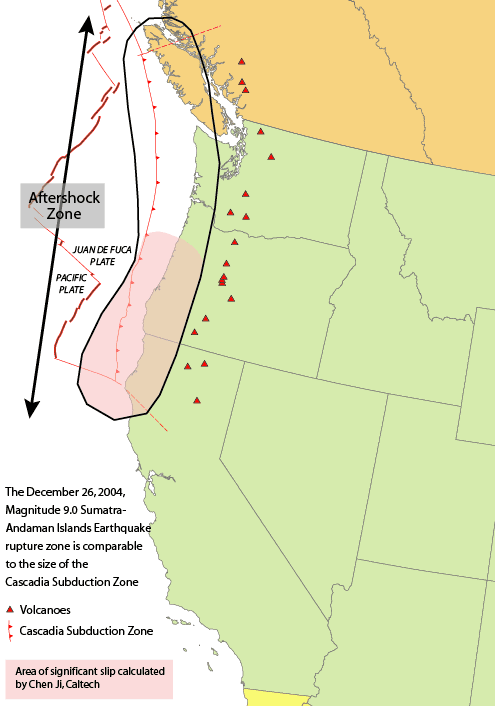
Area of the Cascadia subduction zone, with the Mount Meager massif being the northernmost red triangle in the Cascade Volcanic Arc

The Mount Meager massif is part of the Garibaldi Volcanic Belt (GVB), the northernmost segment of the Cascade Volcanic Arc. This volcanic belt includes cinder cones, calderas, stratovolcanoes and subglacial volcanoes (volcanoes under glaciers or ice sheets) that have been active in the last 10,000 years. The latest explosive eruption in the Garibaldi Volcanic Belt occurred at a crater on the northeastern slope of the massif about 2,400 years ago, which forms a clearly defined depression.

The GVB extends north from the Watts Point volcano to at least as far as the Meager massif. Because little is known about the volcanoes north of the massif, such as the Silverthrone and Franklin Glacier volcanic complexes, experts disagree about their nature. Some scientists regard the Silverthrone Caldera as the northernmost volcano of the Garibaldi Volcanic Belt, while others contend that the geology of the massif more closely matches that of the GVB. It is also unclear whether the Milbanke Sound Cones are part of the Garibaldi Belt or formed by different tectonic processes. However, there is evidence the Silverthrone and Franklin Glacier complexes are related to activity at the Cascadia subduction zone. Geologically these two volcanoes contain the same rock types as those found elsewhere in the Cascade Arc, including rhyolites, dacites, andesites and basaltic andesites. Such rock types are produced by subduction zone volcanism indicating volcanism at Silverthrone and Franklin Glacier is probably related to subduction. If these two volcanoes are true Cascade Arc volcanoes, the Mount Meager massif is not the northernmost volcano of the Garibaldi Belt or the Cascade Arc.

==== Cascade Volcanic Arc ====
Volcanism in the Cascade Volcanic Arc is caused by subduction of the Juan de Fuca Plate under the North American Plate at the Cascadia subduction zone. This is a 1,094 km (680 mi) long fault zone lying 80 km (50 mi) off the Pacific Northwest from Northern California to southwestern British Columbia. The plates move at a relative rate of more than 10 mm (0.39 in) per year at an oblique angle to the subduction zone. Because of the huge fault area, the Cascadia subduction zone can produce large earthquakes of magnitude 7.0 or greater. The interface between the Juan de Fuca and North American plates remains locked for periods of roughly 500 years. During these periods, stress builds up on the interface between the plates and causes tectonic uplift of the North American margin. When the plate finally slips, it releases 500 years of stored energy in a massive earthquake.

Unlike most subduction zones worldwide, there is no deep oceanic trench present along the continental margin in Cascadia. The mouth of the Columbia River empties directly into the subduction zone and deposits silt at the bottom of the Pacific Ocean, burying this large depression, or area of sunken land. Massive floods from prehistoric Glacial Lake Missoula during the Late Pleistocene also deposited large amounts of sediment into the trench. However, as with other subduction zones the outer margin is slowly being compressed like a giant spring. When the stored energy is suddenly released by slippage across the fault at irregular intervals, the Cascadia subduction zone can create enormous earthquakes such as the magnitude 9.0 Cascadia earthquake of January 26, 1700. However earthquakes along the Cascadia subduction zone are uncommon, and there is evidence of a decline in volcanic activity over the last few million years. The probable explanation lies in the rate of convergence between the Juan de Fuca and North American plates, which converge at 3 cm (1.2 in) to 4 cm (1.6 in) per year, about half the rate of convergence from seven million years ago.

=== Local geography ===
The location and extent of the Garibaldi Volcanic Belt, showing its isolated volcanoes and related volcanic features

Six main summits constitute the Mount Meager massif. The highest and northernmost summit is Plinth Peak with an elevation of 2,680 m (8,790 ft). Mount Meager itself is 2,650 m (8,690 ft) in elevation. Capricorn Mountain west of Mount Meager rises with an elevation of 2,570 m (8,430 ft). Just west of Capricorn Mountain lies Mount Job, 2,493 m (8,179 ft) in elevation. Pylon Peak with an elevation of 2,481 m (8,140 ft) is south of Capricorn Mountain and Mount Meager. Devastator Peak, also known as The Devastator, has an elevation of 2,315 m (7,595 ft) and is the lowest and southernmost summit of the massif.

Streams and glaciers have played a significant role in dissecting the massif, and its upper slopes are covered with snow and ice. Numerous feeder dikes to older units, formed when magma intrudes into a crack then crystallizes as a sheet intrusion, are exposed by deep erosion. Perkin's Pillar, a vertical tower of brecciated lava, represented an erosional remnant of the massif until its collapse in June 2005. More than 10 streams drain meltwater from the Mount Meager massif, including Capricorn Creek, Job Creek, No Good Creek, Angel Creek, Devastation Creek, Canyon Creek and Affliction Creek. The massif is located within one of British Columbia's many territorial divisions known as the Lillooet Land District.

=== Local geomorphology ===
The geomorphology of the Mount Meager massif resembles that of Glacier Peak, another Cascade Arc volcano in the U.S. state of Washington. It consists of at least four overlapping stratovolcanoes that are younger from south to north. With a total volume of 20 km^{3} (4.8 mi^{3}), the massif is older than most volcanoes in the Cascade Arc, tracing its history back to 2,200,000 years ago. In the Cascade Range, the oldest volcanoes are generally no more than a million years old. This includes Mount Rainier (500,000 years old), Lassen Peak (25,000 years old), Mount Jefferson (290,000 years old) and Mount St. Helens (50,000 years old). However, portions of the massif formed in the last million years. The volcano is made of volcanic rocks ranging from rhyodacite to basalt. Rhyodacite forms a series of eroded volcanic plugs which form the highest peaks. Their slopes are covered with their eruptive products and serve as the surface expressions of intrusions. As a result, they provide a unique opportunity to study the relationships between magma chambers and their lavas. The mafic (rich in magnesium and iron), intermediate (between mafic and felsic) and felsic (rich in feldspar and quartz) volcanic rocks of the massif were erupted from at least eight volcanic vents.

=== Bridge River Vent ===
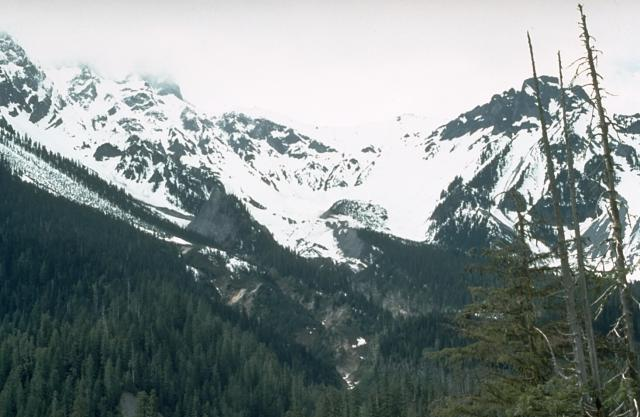
The glaciated northeastern flank of Plinth Peak. Also shown is the inconspicuous ice and debris-covered Bridge River Vent in the middle of the photo.

The Bridge River Vent is a relatively young volcanic crater that formed during an eruption about 2,400 years ago. This eruption ranged in character from explosive to effusive and involved lava dome extrusion, pyroclastic flows, lahars and lava flows. Eastward migration of the eruption column spread material across Western Canada to deposit the Bridge River Ash. In the Bridge River and Lillooet River area the ash occurs as a coarse-textured deposit with blocks of pumice up to 10 cm (3.9 in) in diameter. The texture rapidly becomes finer eastward from the Bridge River. At Big Bar on the Fraser River pellets are up to 3 mm (0.12 in) in diameter while pellets in the Messiter area have a maximum diameter of 0.7 mm (0.028 in).

Situated on the northeastern flank of Plinth Peak, the Bridge River Vent has an elevation of 1,524 m (5,000 ft). It has oversteepened walls covered with ice and debris from volcanic activity and slope collapses. The crater is roughly bowl-shaped, although it is breached on the northern side. Because the Bridge River Vent is located on the northern slope of the Mount Meager massif, it represents a satellite vent. The eruption that formed the Bridge River Vent was probably fed through a conduit from the magma chamber below the massif. A stress field controlled by regional tectonics has been commonly invoked to explain the dynamics of lateral flow (flowing laterally rather than vertically toward the surface) of magma from a reservoir to produce such eruptions.

== Human history ==
=== Naming ===
The name Meager Mountain was adopted on May 6, 1924, as labelled on a 1923 British Columbia map. In 1966 the volcano was renamed Mount Meager. According to a BC Geographical Names letter written in March 1983, "the local name, Cathedral, was duplicated elsewhere, so the mountain was renamed Meager after the creek of that name which lies to the south of it". Meager Creek is named after J. B. Meager who owned timber licences on the creek. Despite its official name, Mount Meager is sometimes mistakenly spelled Mount Meagre or Mount Meagher.

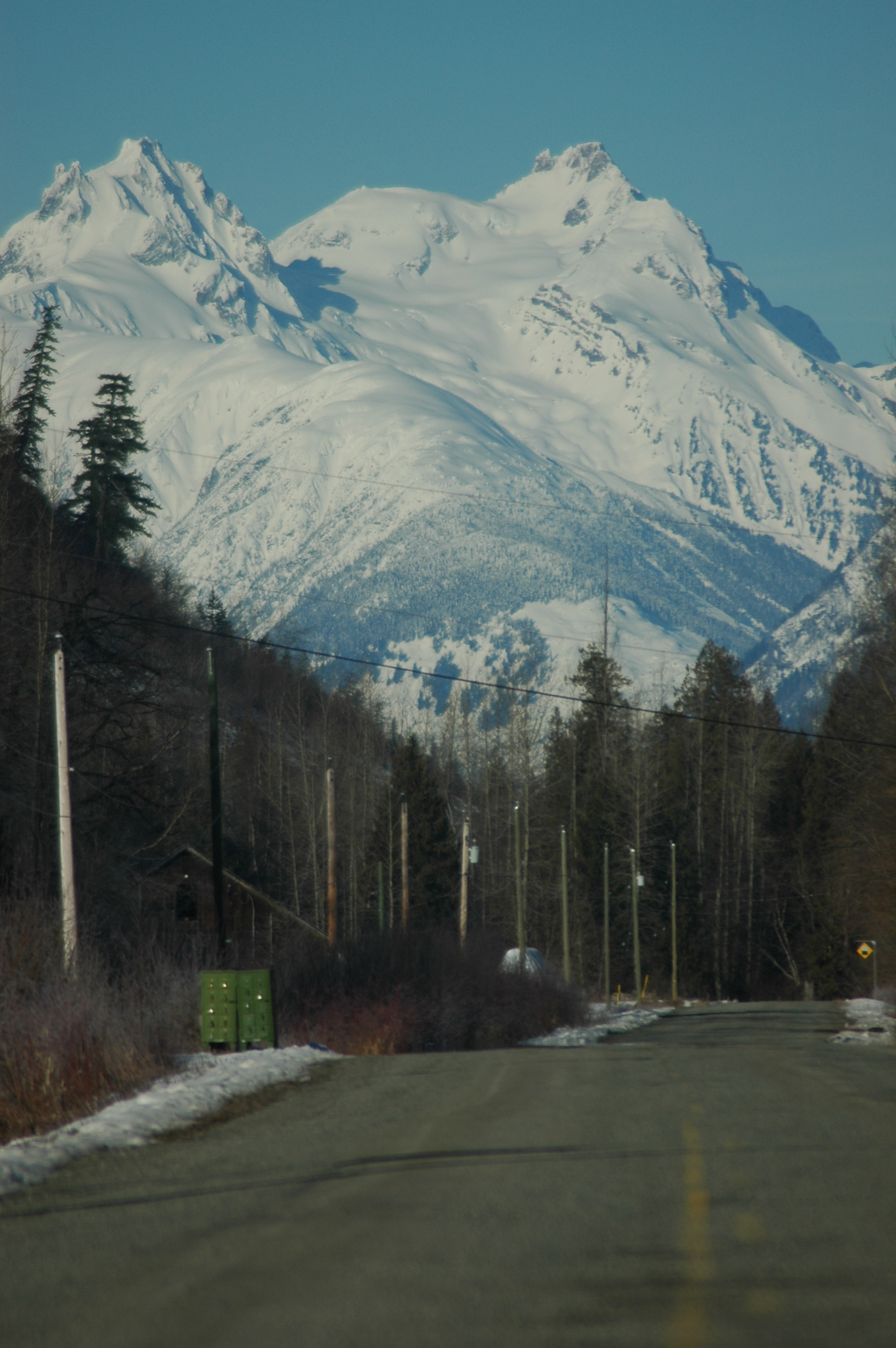
The Mount Meager massif on February 11, 2006

The massif's peak names were submitted by Canadian mountaineer Neal M. Carter, who was a member of the British Columbia Mountaineering Club. Devastator Peak was officially named on August 3, 1977 in association with Devastation Glacier. Plinth Peak was officially named on September 6, 1951 as identified in Carter's 1932 sketch map and article "Explorations in the Lillooet River Watershed". Mount Job and Pylon Peak were both officially named on January 17, 1957, from their labels on Carter's 1954 sketch map of the Lillooet River. Capricorn Mountain was originally identified as Mount Capricorn in the 1932 Canadian Alpine Journal, Vol XXI. According to the journal, "the name chosen for the 8440-foot mountain was Mt. Capricorn, a variation of the all-too-common appellation "Goat Mountain", applied by Bert [Perkins] to the stream which drains the Capricorn glacier at its base". Subsequently, the peak was renamed to Capricorn Mountain on June 22, 1967.

=== Mining and geothermal energy ===
A large pumice outcrop more than 2,000 m (6,600 ft) long and 1,000 m (3,300 ft) wide has been the subject of mining operations since at least the 1970s. The deposit was first held by J. MacIsaac. In the mid-1970s the second owner W. H. Willes investigated and mined the pumice. It was crushed, removed and stored close to the village of Pemberton. Later the bridge that was used to access the pumice deposit was washed out and mining operations were not renewed. Mining resumed in 1988 when the deposit was staked by L. B. Bustin. In 1990 the pumice outcrop was bought by D. R. Carefoot from the owners B. Chore and M. Beaupre. In a program from 1991 to 1992 workers evaluated the deposit for its properties as a construction material and as an absorber for oil and stonewash. About 7,500 m^{3} (260,000 ft^{3}) of pumice was mined in 1998 by the Great Pacific Pumice Incorporation.

The Mount Meager massif has been investigated as a potential geothermal energy resource. At least 16 geothermal sites have been identified in British Columbia, the Mount Meager area being one of the five areas most capable of commercial development. At Meager Creek, there is potential for commercial development of a 100–200 megawatt power station. Nearby Pebble Creek also has "very good" potential for a 200 megawatt plant. Because the two creeks offer the greatest potential for commercial development, the Mount Meager area is the most promising site for geothermal power development in British Columbia.

== Volcanic history ==
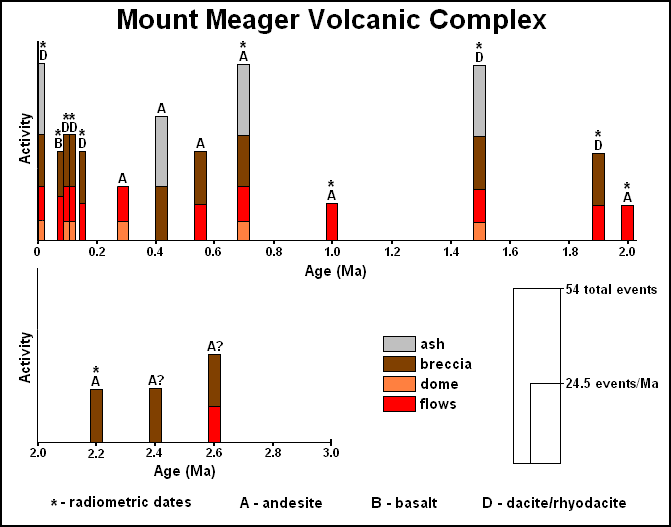
Diagrammatic representation of eruptive activity at the Mount Meager massif in millions of years (Ma). Height of the histogram gives a very crude indication of the size of the event. The latest event about 2,400 years ago (shown in the histograph as the latest eruption) was similar to the 1980 eruption of Mount St. Helens. Eruptive events marked with question marks are those with uncertain identity.

At least 54 eruptions have occurred at the massif in the last 2,600,000 years, ranging in character from effusive to explosive. Four primary eruptive periods have been identified, with individual eruptions separated by thousands of years. Large northwest–southeast trending structures paralleling Harrison Lake and the Pemberton Valley may control volcanic activity at the volcano or at least create zones of crustal weakness that are penetrated by rising magma batches.

=== First record of activity ===
During the first eruptive period between 2,200,000 and 1,900,000 years ago, eruption of intermediate to felsic pyroclastic rocks occurred at the southern end of the massif. Basal breccia, perhaps from an exhumed vent, underlies andesite and tuffs, flows, lava domes and breccia of Devastator Peak. It has a maximum thickness of 300 m (980 ft) and overlies a 400 m (1,300 ft) high ridge of bedrock that formed between 251,000,000 and 65,500,000 years ago during the Mesozoic era.

At the southwestern end of the massif, dacite with sparse phenocrysts (large and conspicuous crystals) of quartz, plagioclase and hornblende represents a 200 m (660 ft) thick remnant of subhorizontal lava flows. Although the first eruptive period is generally estimated to have started about 2,200,000 years ago, two andesite eruptions may have occurred about 2,400,000 and 2,600,000 years ago. The first might have produced lava flows and breccia, whereas the latter may have erupted mainly breccia.

=== The Devastator and Pylon assemblage eruptive periods ===
The second eruptive period between 1,600,000 and 1,400,000 years ago produced rhyodacite tuff, breccia, lavas and domes of The Devastator Assemblage. This 500 m (1,600 ft) thick geological formation lies on the south and west flanks of Pylon Peak and Devastator Peak. Its western portion consists of roughly layered tephra while its eastern end represents the lava flows and subvolcanic intrusions of a partly preserved vent. Here, The Devastator Assemblage is massive and steeply truncates basal breccia from the first eruptive period.

Volcanic activity of the third eruptive period occurred between 1,100,000 and 200,000 years ago. A thick sequence of andesite lava flows were erupted from the volcanic plug of Devastator Peak, creating the Pylon Assemblage. With a maximum thickness of more than 1 km (0.62 mi), the Pylon Assemblage is the largest rock unit comprising the Mount Meager massif. The lava flows are layered, separated by a thin layer of lapilli tuff and reddened breccia. A concentration of subvolcanic intrusions and coarse volcanic breccia clasts more than 100 m (330 ft) in length suggest that Devastator Peak is a major vent.

=== Formation of the Plinth, Job, Capricorn and Mosaic assemblages ===
The fourth and final eruptive period 150,000 to less than 3,000 years ago produced rhyodacite lava flows, domes, breccias and subvolcanic intrusions of the Plinth, Job and Capricorn assemblages. Around Mount Job, porphyritic hornblende, biotite and quartz rhyodacite lava flows of the Job Assemblage were erupted. They are prominently layered and locally columnar jointed. On the east side of Affliction Glacier, they overlie porphyritic andesite lava flows of the Pylon Assemblage. Later, rhyodacite lava flows of the Capricorn Assemblage were erupted and flowed over biotite rhyodacite of the Job Assemblage. The upper 600 m (2,000 ft) of Capricorn Mountain and Mount Job are formed by these lava flows.

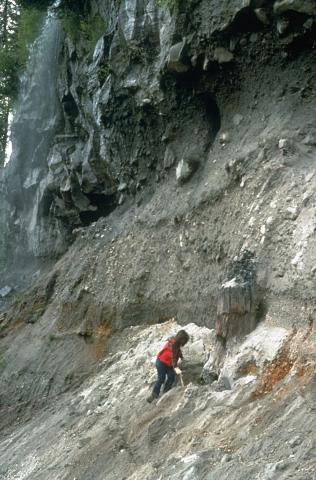
A geologist next to a tree trunk that was buried by ash-fall deposits and then overrun by a pyroclastic flow from the Bridge River Vent eruption about 2,400 years ago

Another sequence of rhyodacite lava flows were subsequently erupted and form the Plinth Assemblage. Mount Meager, a massive lava dome or volcanic plug, consists of steeply inclined flow layering and was the southern source of Plinth Assemblage lava flows and breccias. Plinth Peak was also formed during the Plinth Assemblage eruptive stage and is mostly composed of prominent columnar or partly jointed lava flows. Its north ridge and flat-topped summit contain three areas of steep flow layering and subhorizontally-oriented columnar jointing. These areas are possibly the remains of volcanic plugs or lava domes that were the northern source of Plinth Assemblage lava flows. The Mosaic Assemblage, a sparsely porphyritic plagioclase-augite-olivine basalt and trachybasalt formation, also formed during the fourth eruptive period. It is the remains of scoriaceous lava flows, breccias, volcanic bombs and pillow lavas.

The best known and most documented eruption of the Mount Meager massif is a large explosive eruption that occurred about 2,400 years ago. This eruption, which likely reached 5 on the Volcanic Explosivity Index (VEI), was similar to the 1980 eruption of Mount St. Helens. It sent a massive Plinian column at least 20 km (12 mi) high into the atmosphere. Prevailing westerly winds carried volcanic ash from this explosion eastwards to as far as Alberta. Nearby areas were devastated by heavy pyroclastic fall when parts of the Plinian column collapsed. Later, a series of pyroclastic flows were erupted and travelled 7 km (4.3 mi) downstream. After this, a lava flow was erupted that repeatedly collapsed on the steep slopes of Plinth Peak, creating a thick, welded breccia deposit that blocked the Lillooet River. This created a lake just upstream which later collapsed to produce a massive outburst flood. Large boulders were carried downstream for more than 2 km (1.2 mi), but the destructive floodwaters continued further. Later, a small dacite lava flow was erupted, which cooled into well-preserved columnar joints. The entire eruption cycle originated from the Bridge River Vent on the northeastern flank of Plinth Peak. This is the latest known eruption of the Mount Meager massif, as well as the largest known Holocene explosive eruption in Canada. However, it is unknown when this eruption ended.

In 1977, J. A. Westgate of the University of Toronto suggested that a smaller eruption may have occurred at the Bridge River Vent after the eruption 2,400 years ago, sending tephra southeast. A tephra deposit overlying the Bridge River Ash at Otter Creek shows strong genetic relationships with the Bridge River Ash, differing only by its absence of biotite. In earlier publications, this tephra is classified as part of the Bridge River Ash. However, it has been dated to be about 2,000 radiocarbon years old, indicating that this tephra is a few hundred years younger than the Bridge River Ash. Apparent absence of biotite and occurrence well south of the Bridge River Ash likewise favour a separate identity. Large-volume, fine-grained debris flows north of the volcano might have been caused by volcanic activity. If this is correct, the knowledge of eruptions at the Mount Meager massif in the last 10,000 years is insufficient.

=== Recent activity ===
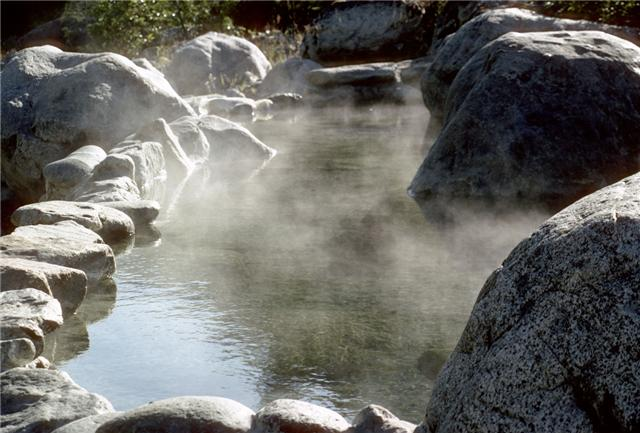
A hot spring near Meager Creek related to volcanism at the massif

Two small hot spring clusters are found at the Mount Meager massif, indicating magmatic heat is still present. These two clusters of hot springs, known as the Meager Creek Hot Springs and Pebble Creek Hot Springs, are most likely related to recent volcanic activity at the massif. The Meager Creek Hot Springs, the largest in British Columbia, remain free of snow for most of the year. The springs at the Mount Meager massif might be evidence of a shallow magma chamber beneath the surface.

Between 1970 and 2005 more than 20 small earthquakes were recorded at the volcano. The magnitudes of these events were generally no higher than 2.0 on the Richter magnitude scale and they originated 20 km (12 mi) to less than 1 km (0.62 mi) below the surface. Other volcanoes in the Garibaldi Volcanic Belt with recorded seismicity include Mount Garibaldi, Mount Cayley and Silverthrone Caldera. Seismic data suggest that these volcanoes still contain active magma chambers, indicating that some Garibaldi Belt volcanoes are probably active with significant potential hazards. The seismic activity corresponds with some of Canada's recently formed volcanoes and with persistent volcanoes that have had major explosive activity throughout their history such as Mount Garibaldi and the Mount Cayley and Mount Meager massifs.

Fumarolic activity and sulfur smells were detected at the massif in 2016, with a fumarole field discovered on the Job Glacier. This was followed by monitoring of the mountain by Natural Resources Canada volcanologists, the results of which did not detect much seismicity. The fumarole field was considered unsafe to approach or enter due to the presence of hydrogen sulfide and potentially unstable ice crevasses.

== Threats and preparedness ==
=== Eruptions ===
The Mount Meager massif remains a major volcanic hazard, capable of producing highly explosive eruptions. A full-scale eruption would threaten many populated areas throughout southern British Columbia and Alberta. Pemberton, a community 50 km (31 mi) downstream from the massif, faces high risk. If the volcano were to erupt violently, it would disrupt the Lillooet River fishery as well as nearby mining and logging activity. In addition, the Mount Meager massif lies in the immediate proximity of a major air traffic route. Volcanic ash reduces visibility and can cause jet engine failure, as well as damage to flight control systems. Even a minor eruption from the volcano could cause massive devastation by rapidly melting glacial ice to produce large debris flows. An example of such an event is the 1985 Armero tragedy in Colombia, which resulted from a small eruption under the summit ice cap of Nevado del Ruiz.

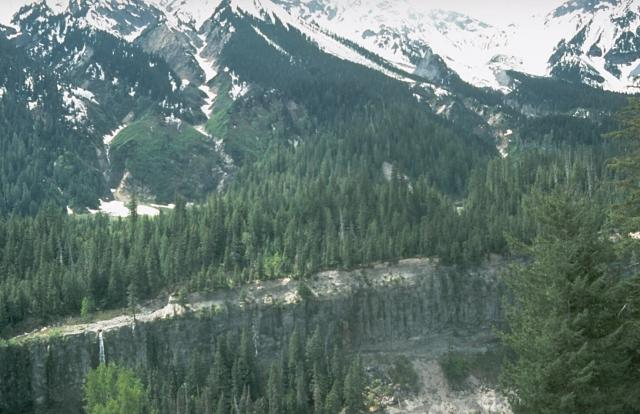
This pyroclastic flow deposit forms the foreground canyon wall on the Lillooet River. It erupted from the Bridge River Vent on the northeastern flank of Plinth Peak.

Jack Souther, a leading authority on geothermal resources and volcanism in the Canadian Cordillera, expressed concern about the potential for another eruption:

At present the volcanoes of the Garibaldi Belt are quiet, presumed dead but still not completely cold. But the flare-up of Meager Mountain 2,500 years ago raises the question, "Could it happen again?" Was the explosive eruption of Meager Mountain the last gasp of the Garibaldi Volcanic Belt or only the most recent event in its on-going life? The short answer is nobody really knows for sure. So just in case I sometimes do a quick check of the old hot-spots when I get off the Peak Chair.

Because of concerns about potential eruptions and danger to communities in the area, the Geological Survey of Canada plans to create hazard maps and emergency plans for the Mount Meager massif as well as Mount Cayley to the south. Although very few eruptions in Canada have been witnessed by people, it remains nonetheless an area of intense volcanic activity. According to the Geologic Hazards '91 Workshop, "priority should be given to eruption impact studies of the two recently active volcanic centres closest to urban areas, Mount Baker and Mount Meager. The former case will require a combined US-Canada-Washington State-B.C. effort".

The Mount Meager massif is not monitored closely enough by the Geological Survey of Canada to ascertain how active its magma system is. The Canadian National Seismograph Network has been established to monitor earthquakes throughout Canada, but it is too far away to provide an accurate indication of activity under the mountain. It may sense an increase in seismic activity if the massif becomes highly restless, but this may only provide a warning for a large eruption; the system might detect activity only once the volcano has started erupting. If the Mount Meager massif were to erupt, mechanisms exist to orchestrate relief efforts. The Interagency Volcanic Event Notification Plan (IVENP) was created to outline the notification procedure of some of the main agencies that would respond to an erupting volcano in Canada, an eruption close to the Canada–United States border or any eruption that would affect Canada.

Although the Mount Meager massif is a potentially active volcano, as of 2016 there was no evidence of an imminent eruption. Many shallow earthquakes normally occur before a volcano erupts. As magma rises to the surface over time, it will probably create much more vigour and heat at the regional hot springs, as well as the formation of new springs or fumaroles. These signs generally occur for weeks, months or years before a potential eruption, although the possibility of an eruption occurring in the near future remains low. A significant structural collapse associated with loss of glacial buttressing might affect the magma plumbing system and lead to an eruption.

=== Landslides ===
Scientists have argued that the Mount Meager massif, made of altered volcanic rock which breaks apart easily, is the most unstable mountain massif in Canada and may also be its most active landslide area. More than 25 landslides have occurred there in the last 8,000 years, and debris flows, mainly from the massif, have also filled Meager Creek valley to a depth of 250 m (820 ft).

Large volcano-associated debris flows known as lahars pose a threat to populated areas downstream from glaciated volcanoes. Although lahars are typically associated with the effects of volcanic eruptions, they can occur whenever conditions allow collapse and movement of mud originating from existing volcanic ash deposits. Melting snow and ice, intense rainfall or the breakout of a summit crater lake can all generate lahars. Landslides at the Mount Meager massif may also be indirectly related to climate change. Several tension cracks extend up to the summit, and as global warming causes glaciers to melt, the meltwater reaches deep into the massif. It then flows along the ruptured surfaces creating landslide zones.

Because the Mount Meager massif is capable of producing large landslides, Meager Creek valley is probably the most dangerous valley in the Canadian Cordillera. Rapidly growing communities down the Lillooet River valley, such as Pemberton, are vulnerable despite their distance from the massif. As Pemberton continues to grow it will eventually extend into the surrounding mountains, creating a major hazard for people living there.

The landslide risk is somewhat mitigated by the Lillooet River Early Warning System which was established in 2014 to alert the Pemberton Valley of landslides. Monitoring is done by measuring the Lillooet River water level using two sensors: one on the Hurley River Forestry Bridge and the other in the river. Damming of the Lillooet River by a landslide would be indicated by the lowering of the water level while the release of a landslide dam would be followed by water level rise.

==== Prehistoric ====
| Event | Source | Years before present | Volume | Reference |
|---|---|---|---|---|
| Rock avalanche/debris flow | Pylon Peak | 7900 | 450,000,000 m^{3} (16,000,000,000 cu ft) | Friele and Clague (2004) |
| Rock avalanche/debris flow | Job Creek | 6250 | 500,000,000 m^{3} (18,000,000,000 cu ft) | Friele et al. (2005) |
| Rock avalanche/debris flow | Capricorn Creek | 5250 | 5,000,000 m^{3} (180,000,000 ft^{3}) | McNeely and McCuaig (1991) |
| Rock avalanche/debris flow/hyperconcentrated flow | Pylon Peak | 4400 | 200,000,000 m^{3} (7,100,000,000 cu ft) | Friele and Clague (2004); Friele et al. (2005) |
| Rock avalanche/debris flow | Job Creek, eruption precursor | 2600 | 500,000,000 m^{3} (18,000,000,000 cu ft) | Friele et al. (2005); Simpson et al. (2006) |
| Pyroclastic flow | Syn-eruptive | 2400 | 440,000,000 m^{3} (16,000,000,000 cu ft) | Stasiuk et al. (1996); Stewart (2002) |
| Rock avalanche/outburst flood/debris flow/hyperconcentrated flow | Syn-eruptive | 2400 | 200,000,000 m^{3} (7,100,000,000 cu ft) | Stasiuk et al. (1996); Stewart (2002) |
| Rock avalanche | Syn- to post-eruptive | 2400 | 44,000,000 m^{3} (1,600,000,000 cu ft) | Stasiuk et al. (1996); Stewart (2002) |
| Debris flow | Job Creek | 2240 | 1,000,000 m^{3} (35,000,000 ft^{3}) | Pierre, Jakob and Clague (2008) |
| Debris flow | Devastation Creek | 2170 | 12,000,000 m^{3} (420,000,000 ft^{3}) | McNeely and McCuaig (1991) |
| Debris flow | Angel Creek | 1920 | 500,000 m^{3} (18,000,000 ft^{3}) | McNeely and McCuaig (1991) |
| Debris flow | Job Creek | 1860 | 1,000,000 m^{3} (35,000,000 ft^{3}) | McNeely and McCuaig (1991) |
| Debris flow | Job Creek | 870 | 9,000,000 m^{3} (320,000,000 ft^{3}) | Jordan (1994) |
| Debris flow | No Good Creek | 800 | 100,000 m^{3} (3,500,000 ft^{3}) | McNeely and McCuaig (1991) |
| Debris flow | Job Creek | 630 | 1,000,000 m^{3} (35,000,000 ft^{3}) | Pierre, Jakob and Clague (2008) |
| Debris flow | No Good Creek | 370 | 5,000,000 m^{3} (180,000,000 ft^{3}) | McNeely and McCuaig (1991) |
| Debris flow | Angel Creek | 210 | 100,000 m^{3} (3,500,000 ft^{3}) | McNeely and McCuaig (1991) |

==== Historic ====
| Event | Source | Year | Volume | Reference |
|---|---|---|---|---|
| Debris flow | Capricorn Creek | 1850 | 1,300,000 m^{3} (46,000,000 ft^{3}) | Jakob (1996); McNeely and McCuaig (1991) |
| Debris flow | Capricorn Creek | 1903 | 30,000,000 m^{3} (1,100,000,000 cu ft) | Jakob (1996) |
| Debris flow | Devastation Creek | 1931 | 3,000,000 m^{3} (110,000,000 ft^{3}) | Carter (1931); Decker et al. (1977); Jordan (1994) |
| Rock avalanche | Capricorn Creek | 1933 | 500,000 m^{3} (18,000,000 ft^{3}) | Croft (1983) |
| Rock avalanche | Devastation Creek | 1947 | 3,000,000 m^{3} (110,000,000 ft^{3}) | Read (1978) |
| Debris flow | Capricorn Creek | 1972 | 200,000 m^{3} (7,100,000 ft^{3}) | Jordan (1994) |
| Rock avalanche | Devastation Creek | 1975 | 12,000,000 m^{3} (420,000,000 ft^{3}) | Mokievsky-Zubot (1977); Evans (2001) |
| Debris flow | Affliction Creek | 1984 | 200,000 m^{3} (7,100,000 ft^{3}) | Jordan (1994) |
| Rock avalanche | Mount Meager | 1986 | 500,000 m^{3} (18,000,000 ft^{3}) | Evans (1987) |
| Debris flow | Capricorn Creek | 1998 | 1,300,000 m^{3} (46,000,000 ft^{3}) | Bovis and Jakob (2000) |
| Debris flow | Capricorn Creek | 2009 | 500,000 m^{3} (18,000,000 ft^{3}) | Friele (unpublished data) |
| Rock slide/debris flow | Capricorn Creek | 2010 | 48,500,000 m^{3} (1,710,000,000 cu ft) | Guthrie et al. (2012) |

===== 1975 landslide =====
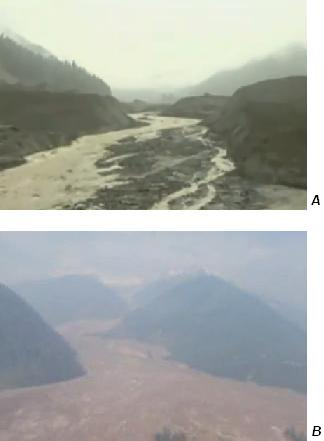
These river valleys are filled with debris from the 2010 landslide of Mount Meager. Photo A is the collapsed debris dam near the intersection of Capricorn Creek and Meager Creek. Photo B is the debris flow at the junction of Meager Creek and the Lillooet River.

A massive rock avalanche occurred at the massif on July 22, 1975. With a volume of 13,000,000 m^{3} (460,000,000 ft^{3}), it buried and killed a group of four geologists at the confluence of Devastation Creek and Meager Creek. The landslide originated on the western flank of Pylon Peak and flowed down Devastation Creek for 7 km (4.3 mi). Geologic studies have shown that the landslide was the result of a complex history of glacial erosion, loading and unloading of the toe (a protrusion at the front of the slide mass) caused by the Little Ice Age advance and subsequent retreat of Devastation Glacier due to global warming.

===== 2010 landslide =====
On August 6, 2010, a massive debris flow cascaded down from Capricorn Glacier at a speed of 30 m (98 ft) per second. Experts initially estimated that the volume of debris totaled 40,000,000 m^{3} (1.4×10^{9} ft^{3}), which would make it the second largest landslide on record in Canadian history, behind the 1965 Hope Slide that removed 47,000,000 m^{3} (1.7×10^{9} ft^{3}) of rock from Johnson Peak, a mountain in the Nicolum Valley near Hope, British Columbia. However, the landslide was later estimated to be more than 48,500,000 m^{3} (1.71×10^{9} ft^{3}), which would make it the largest of all time in Canada.

The 2010 landslide was 300 m (980 ft) wide and 2 km (1.2 mi) long, creating a dam across Meager Creek and the Lillooet River. This created a lake just upstream. Early concerns that the dam might collapse and flood the Lillooet River valley ended a day later, when part of the dam ruptured and slowly released the accumulated water. An evacuation alert was rescinded, and nearly 1,500 residents were allowed to return to their homes on the weekend after the landslide occurred. No injuries were reported.

== See also ==
- List of Cascade volcanoes
- List of volcanoes in Canada
- Salal Glacier volcanic complex
- Sham Hill
- Tuber Hill
- Volcanology of Western Canada
