= Capricorn Mountain =

Mountain in British Columbia, Canada

- Location within British Columbia
- Interactive map of Capricorn Mountain

Highest point
- Elevation: 2,551 m (8,369 ft)
- Prominence: 303 m (994 ft)
- Listing: Mountains of British Columbia
- Coordinates: 50°37′28″N 123°31′54″W

Geography
- Location: British Columbia, Canada
- District: Lillooet Land District
- Parent range: Pacific Ranges
- Topo map: NTS 92J12 Mount Dalgleish

Geology
- Rock age: Pleistocene
- Mountain type: Stratovolcano
- Volcanic arc: Canadian Cascade Arc
- Volcanic belt: Garibaldi Volcanic Belt
- Last eruption: Pleistocene

Climbing
- First ascent: 1931 N. Carter; A. Dalgleish; T. Fyles; M. Winram
- Easiest route: Climbing

Capricorn Mountain is one of the several volcanic peaks of the Mount Meager massif in southwestern British Columbia, Canada. Its slopes appear to be more gentle than those of the massif's other volcanic peaks. The mountain consists of a boomerang-shaped ridge, with one summit at each end and the main summit in the centre.

== See also ==
- List of volcanoes in Canada
- Cascade Volcanoes
- Garibaldi Volcanic Belt
- Volcanism of Canada
- Volcanism of Western Canada
