= Mount Meager (British Columbia) =

Mountain in British Columbia, Canada

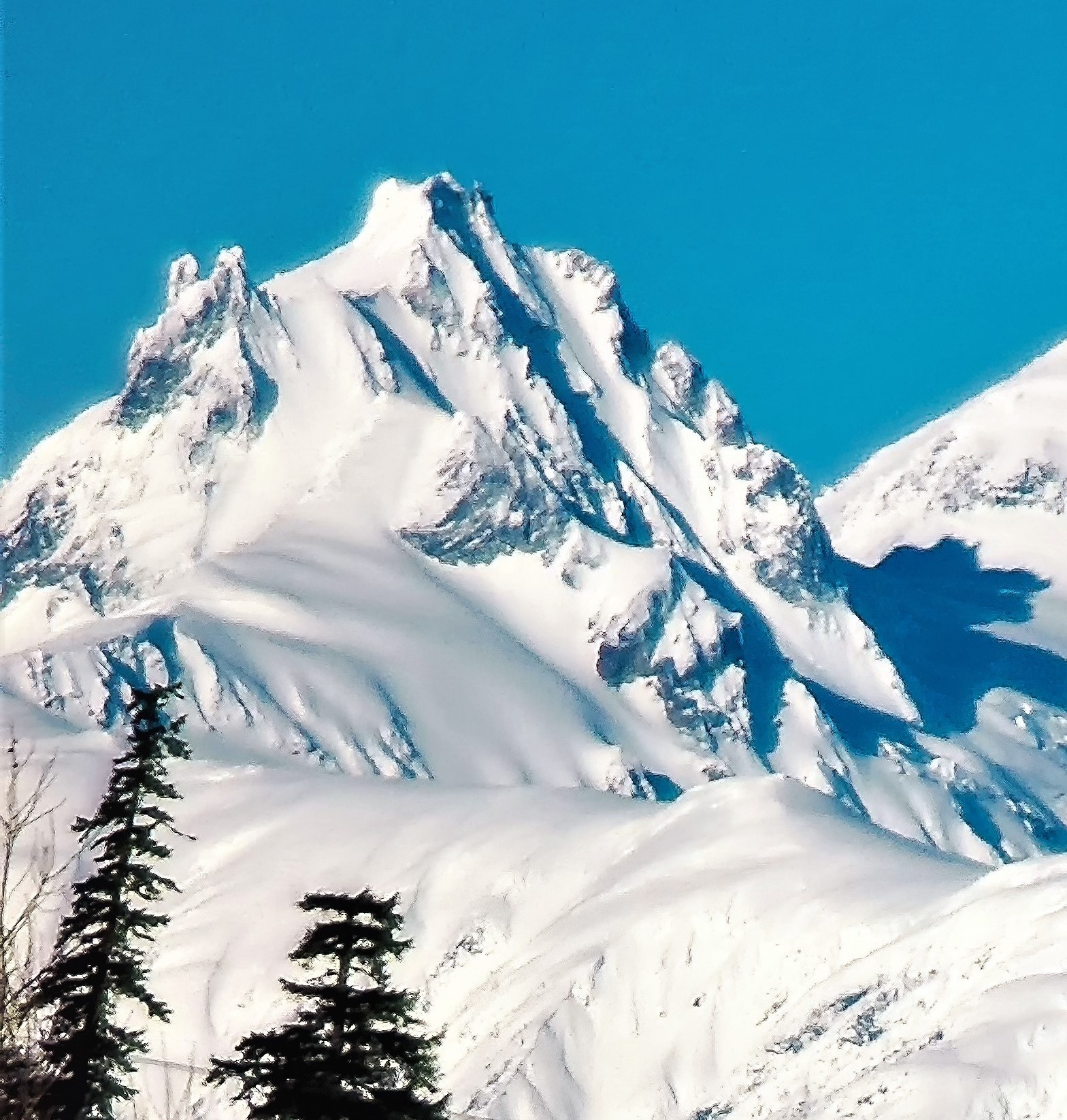
- Southeast aspect

Highest point
- Elevation: 2,650 m (8,690 ft)
- Prominence: 220 m (720 ft)
- Listing: Mountains of British Columbia
- Coordinates: 50°37′54″N 123°30′15″W

Geography
- Location within British Columbia
- Location: British Columbia, Canada
- District: Lillooet Land District
- Parent range: Pacific Ranges
- Topo map: NTS 92J12 Mount Dalgleish

Geology
- Volcanic arc: Canadian Cascade Arc
- Volcanic belt: Garibaldi Volcanic Belt
- Last eruption: Pleistocene age

Climbing
- First ascent: 1931 N. Carter; A. Dalgleish; T. Fyles; M. Winram

Mount Meager (also known as The Cathedral, or Q̓welq̓welústen in the St'at'imcets (Lillooet) language) is a mountain in the Pacific Ranges of the Coast Mountains in British Columbia, Canada. It represents the second highest peak of the Mount Meager massif, a group of coalescent stratovolcanoes in the Garibaldi Volcanic Belt.

The mountain was the source of the 2010 Mount Meager landslide. On August 6, the southern 2,554 m (8,379 ft) peak of Meager collapsed in a series of major rockfalls. The rockfalls transformed into a large debris flow that dammed Meager Creek for about one day. The landslide dam was about 30 m (98 ft) high and impounded water in a temporary lake about 4 km (2.5 mi) long. The debris flow also crossed the Lillooet River downstream and wiped out a forestry road on the opposite bank of the Lillooet River. The response of emergency personnel, fearing a sudden failure of the dam on Meager Creek, was to direct residents on the Lillooet River floodplain, in the village of Pemberton 55 km (34 mi) downstream and in the Lil'wat community at Mount Currie to evacuate the area.
