= Mount Job =

Mountain in British Columbia, Canada

- Location within British Columbia

Highest point
- Elevation: 2,493 m (8,179 ft)
- Prominence: 237 m (778 ft)
- Coordinates: 50°37′29.1″N 123°33′02.4″W

Geography
- Location: British Columbia, Canada
- District: Lillooet Land District
- Parent range: Pacific Ranges
- Topo map: NTS 92J12 Mount Dalgleish

Geology
- Rock age: Pliocene
- Mountain type: Stratovolcano
- Volcanic arc: Canadian Cascade Arc
- Volcanic belt: Garibaldi Volcanic Belt
- Last eruption: Pleistocene

Climbing
- First ascent: 1931 N. Carter; A. Dalgleish; T. Fyles; M. Winram
- Easiest route: Climbing

Mount Job is one of six named volcanic peaks of the Mount Meager massif in British Columbia, Canada. It is a pile of rubble held together by volcanic ash and sand. The main summit of Mount Job is hard to climb because of difficult access and its horribly loose rock.

== See also ==
- List of volcanoes in Canada
- Volcanism of Canada
- Volcanism of Western Canada
- Cascade Volcanoes
- Garibaldi Volcanic Belt
