= Pylon Peak (British Columbia) =

Volcanic peak in British Columbia, Canada

- Location within British Columbia

Highest point
- Elevation: 2,481 m (8,140 ft)
- Prominence: 311 m (1,020 ft)
- Listing: Mountains of British Columbia
- Coordinates: 50°35′51″N 123°31′11″W

Geography
- Country: Canada
- Province: British Columbia
- District: Lillooet Land District
- Parent range: Pacific Ranges
- Topo map: NTS 92J12 Mount Dalgleish

Geology
- Rock age: Pliocene
- Mountain type: Stratovolcano
- Volcanic arc: Canadian Cascade Arc
- Volcanic belt: Garibaldi Volcanic Belt
- Last eruption: Pleistocene

Climbing
- First ascent: 1931 N. Carter; A. Dalgleish; T. Fyles; M. Winram

Pylon Peak is the southernmost of six named volcanic peaks comprising the Mount Meager massif in British Columbia, Canada. Two pinnacled ridges extend from Pylon and are named respectively the Pylons and the Marionettes. Pylon Peak overlooks the Meager Creek Hot Springs.

Erosional remnants of flows from Devastator Peak form the stratified crags of Pylon Peak. These flows occurred 0.5–1.0 million years ago.

== See also ==
- Cascade Volcanoes
- Garibaldi Volcanic Belt
- Volcanism of Canada
- Volcanism of Western Canada
- List of volcanoes in Canada
