= Meager Creek =

Creek and thermal springs in British Columbia, Canada

Coordinates: 50°36′54″N 123°23′40″W

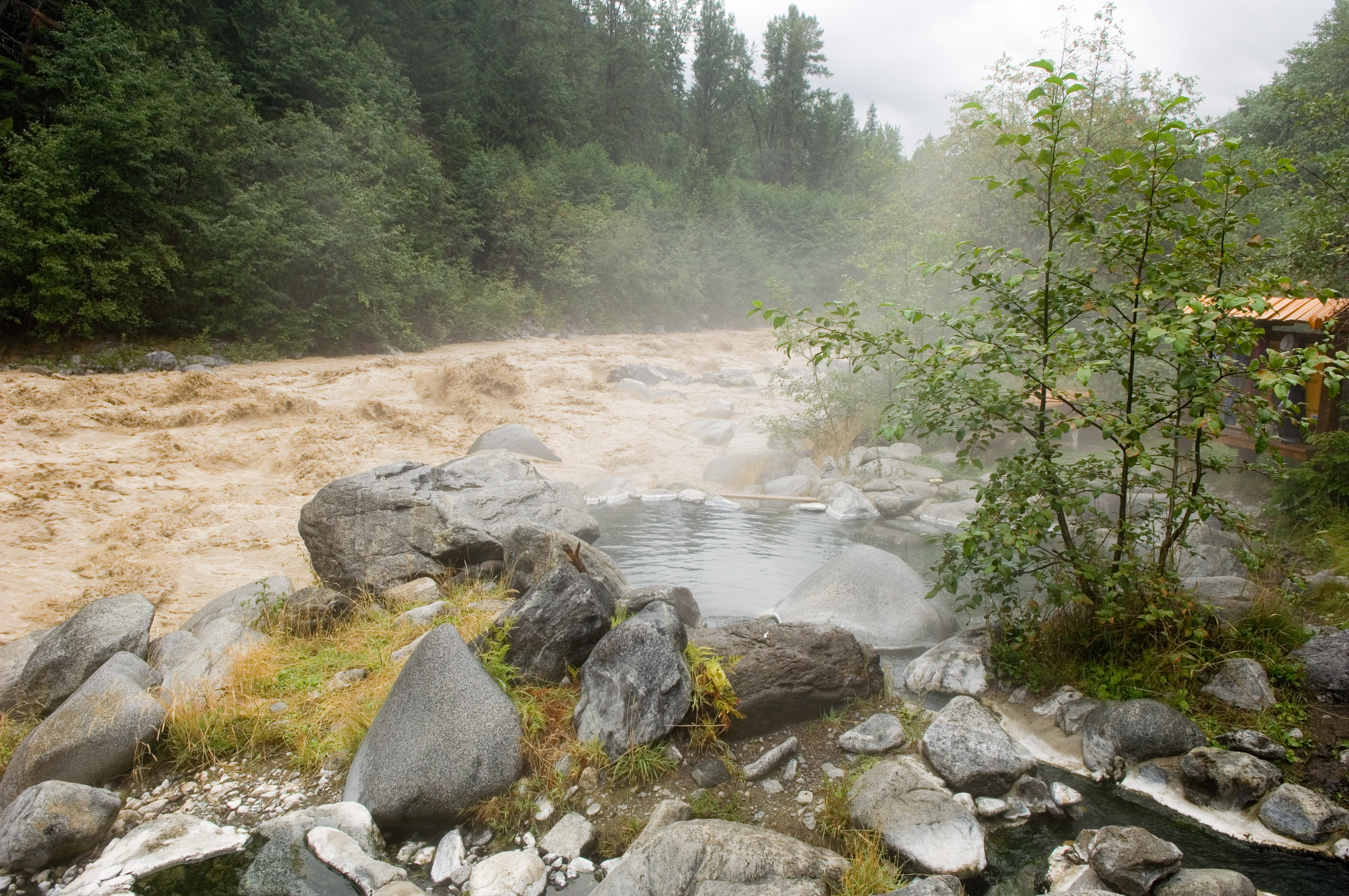
- Meager Creek flowing next to a hot spring pool

Location
- Country: Canada
- Province: British Columbia
- District: Lillooet Land District

Physical characteristics
- Mouth
  - location: Lillooet River

Meager Creek is a creek in the southern Pacific Ranges of the Coast Mountains in British Columbia, Canada. It flows northeast into the Lillooet River approximately 95 km (59 mi) northwest of the village of Pemberton and is adjacent to the Upper Lillooet Provincial Park.

It is noted for a large set of surface hot springs, known as the Meager Creek Hot Springs. These are related to volcanism of the Mount Meager massif on its north side. Keyhole Hot Springs, also known as Pebble Creek Hot Springs, fed from the same geothermal vents is much more accessible, via the ploughed Upper Lillooet FSR (Forest Service Road), and is a 1.5 km (0.93 mi) trail as opposed to 9.5 km (5.9 mi) to Meager Creek Hot Springs. Check the Forest Service Road Reports before travel.

Public access reopened in the summer of 2008, several years after vandalism of the site and flooding damage to the access road and bridge had seen the site closed. On September 19, 2009, the Capricorn Creek Bridge was once again destroyed by a debris slide. The springs were closed to public access, except in winter, when they could be accessed over the top of the Pemberton Icefield / Meager Glacier by means of either snowmobile or cross country skis. Until 2010, the site was serviced by Creekside Resources on a fee basis to use the pools. Though the pools are still officially closed, public access to the area has resumed. Because of limited access, there have been no fecal coliform tests done. Prior to the slide, they were done on a monthly basis, except winter and the sand traps were cleared every 2 to 3 days. The pools must be shoveled out and flushed before use – 45 minutes is the common practice.

A new public trail, named VOC Harrison Hut Trail, opened in the summer of 2014. It was built and completed, in August 2014, by volunteers from the University of British Columbia Varsity Outdoor Club (VOC).

In December 2015, the area was offered up for tenure by the BC Ministry of Forests; they were looking for a proposal to formally develop the existing ad hoc trail from the 6 km (3.7 mi) mark along the VOC Harrison Hut Trail, where it passes through a clear cut and connects to the old Meager Creek Hot Springs Trail, built on an existing decommissioned logging road.

As the pools are officially closed, there is currently no fee. A fee structure will be reinstated if tenure is granted. First right of refusal goes to the historical operator: the Lil'wat First Nation's Creekside Resources. If they defer, the tenure applicant has proposed to maintain the pools. The historical fee prior to the 2010 slide was $5.

Though people camp for free in unofficial sites in the Upper Meager Valley, it is not allowed around the hot spring pools as the Meager Creek Hot Springs Recreational Area is a Minimum Impact Site. Also, camping in the Valley bottom is prohibited because of significant seismic danger.

Wildlife such as wolves, wolverine, moose, raptors, hybrid black-tailed deer/mule deer, hybrid lynx/bob cat, mountain goats, mountain sheep, and waterfowl inhabit the area as well as grizzly and black bears.

The area is about a two-hour drive from Pemberton on paved roads, gravel roads, and dirt tracks. Although normally reached by four-wheel drive vehicles and larger pickup trucks, the last 25 km (16 mi) can be covered by snowmobile in winter.

Avalanche hazards relating to the combined volcanic and glacial character of the surrounding geography are real and ongoing. The valley of Meager Creek is one of the most active and hazardous in the North American Cordillera. Debris flows, mainly from the Mount Meager massif, have filled the valley to a depth of 250 m (820 ft).

== See also ==
- List of rivers of British Columbia
- Volcanology of Western Canada
