= Boulder Creek =

Boulder Creek may refer to:

== Australia ==
- Boulder Creek, Queensland, a locality in the Rockhampton Region, Queensland

== Canada ==
- Boulder Creek (British Columbia), a creek located in the Atlin Country region of British Columbia
- Boulder Creek (Lillooet River) in the Pemberton Valley, British Columbia Canada
- Boulder Creek Hot Springs, at Boulder Creek (Lillooet River) in the Pemberton Valley, British Columbia Canada
- Boulder Creek Provincial Park in the Cassiar District of British Columbia

== United States ==
- communities:
  - Boulder Creek, California
- any of hundreds of streams, including:
  - Boulder Creek (California) in Santa Cruz County
  - Boulder Creek (Fresno County, California)
  - Boulder Creek (Myer Creek tributary) in Imperial County, California
  - Boulder Creek (Colorado), a creek draining the Rocky Mountains to the west of Boulder, Colorado
  - Boulder Creek (South Dakota), a stream in the U.S. state of South Dakota
  - Boulder Creek (Baker Lake tributary), in Whatcom County, Washington
- schools:
  - Boulder Creek High School (Arizona)
