= Birch Creek (British Columbia) =

Coordinates: 59°36′32″N 133°28′38″W

Birch Creek is a creek located in the Atlin Country region of British Columbia. Birch Creek flows parallel to Boulder Creek and Ruby Creek. The creek is located west of Lake Surprise. Birch Creek flows into Pine Creek and was discovered in 1898. The greatest mining activity took place between 1902 and the start of the First World War. Some mining activity also occurred during the 1930s. The Dominion Trust Company hydraulicked Birch Creek in the 1930s. The largest pure gold nugget in the district was recovered from this creek in 1913. The nugget was 73 ounces. In the Gold Boom years, the Creek was largely ignored as the depth of bed rock discouraged hand mining operations. When gold in other creeks in the vicinity were exhausted, attention was turned to Birch. 386,859 grams of unusually coarse gold were recovered from the creek between 1896 and 1945.
