= Wright Creek =

Wright Creek may refer to:

- Wright Creek (British Columbia), Canada
- Wright Creek (Missouri), United States
- Wright Creek (Nanticoke River tributary), Delaware, United States

== See also ==
- Wrights Creek (disambiguation)
