= California's gold =

California's gold may refer to:

- California's Gold, a travel series on public television
- California Gold Rush, a period from 1848 to 1855

== See also ==
- Gold in California
