= Discovery City, British Columbia =

Discovery City
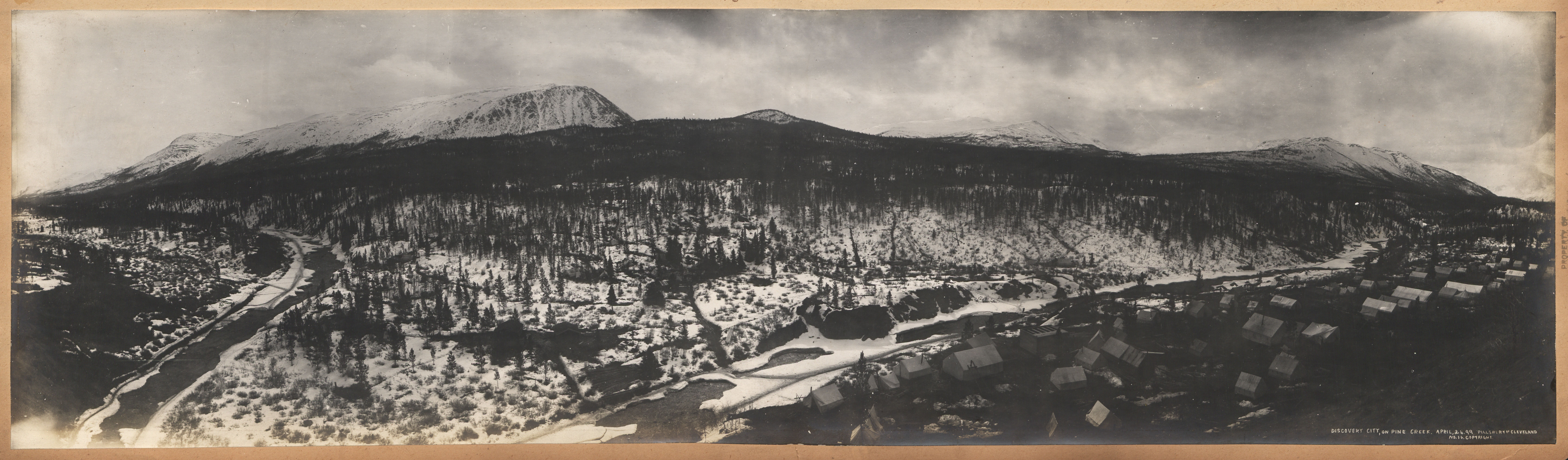
- Discovery City, 1899

- Location of Discovery City in British Columbia
- Coordinates: 59°36′00″N 133°33′00″W
- Country: Canada
- Province: British Columbia

Discovery City is a ghost town located in the Atlin Country region of British Columbia. The city was located near Pine Creek, southwest of the south end of Surprise Lake. Discovery City was also known as Pine City. Discovery City existed to support the gold mining operations in the area. The city was founded in 1898 with the discovery of gold in Pine Creek. For a few years it had a population of 1,000. The city had hotels such as the Pine Tree, The Nugget, The Gold House and others. When the gold was depleted, the city was vacated. By 1915 it was deserted.
