= Pine Creek (British Columbia) =

Coordinates: 59°33′00″N 133°40′18″W

Pine Creek is a creek located in the Atlin Country region of British Columbia. Pine Creek flows out of Lake Surprise and empties into Atlin Lake just south of the town of Atlin. The creek is 12 miles in length. The gold bearing section is 2 miles long. This creek was staked in 1898 by Fritz Miller and Kenneth McLaren. By 1899, 3,000 prospectors stood on the banks of this creek. The largest nugget found weighed just over 48 ounces and was discovered in 1925. The creek has been worked with rockers, waterwheels, sluices and hydraulicked.
