= California gold rush =

Gold rush from 1848 to 1855

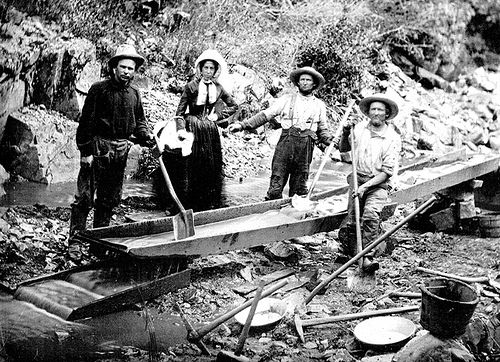
- Prospectors working California gold placer deposits in 1850
- Date: January 24, 1848–1855
- Location: Sierra Nevada and Northern California goldfields; 38°48′01″N 120°53′32″W
- Participants: 300,000 prospectors
- Outcome: California becomes a US state Actions of settlers draw allegations of genocide

The California gold rush (1848–1855) was a gold rush in California, which began on January 24, 1848, when gold was found by James W. Marshall at Sutter's Mill in Coloma, California. The news of gold brought approximately 300,000 people from the rest of the United States and abroad to California, which had recently been conquered from Mexico. The sudden influx of gold into the money supply reinvigorated the American economy; the sudden population increase allowed California to grow rapidly into statehood in the Compromise of 1850. The gold rush had severe effects on Native Californians and accelerated the Native American population's decline from factors including disease, starvation, and according to certain sources, acts of unprovoked aggression.

The effects of the gold rush were substantial. The arrival of large numbers of "forty-niners" (referring to 1849, the peak year for gold rush immigration) led to significant conflict between the newcomers and indigenous people, eventually resulting in whole tribes being displaced in some cases. Outside of California, the first to arrive were from Oregon, Hawaii, and Latin America in late 1848. Of the approximately 300,000 people who came to California during the gold rush, about half arrived by sea and half came overland on the California Trail and the California Road; forty-niners often faced substantial hardships on the trip. While most of the newly arrived were Americans, the gold rush attracted thousands from Latin America, Europe, Australia, and China. Agriculture and ranching expanded throughout the state to meet the needs of the settlers. San Francisco grew from a small settlement of about 200 residents in 1846 to a boomtown of about 36,000 by 1852. Roads, churches, schools and other towns were built throughout California. In 1849, a state constitution was written. The new constitution was adopted by referendum vote; the future state's interim first governor and legislature were chosen. In September 1850, California achieved statehood.

At the beginning of the gold rush, there was no law regarding property rights in the goldfields and a system of "staking claims" was developed. Prospectors retrieved the gold from streams and riverbeds using simple techniques, such as panning. Although mining caused environmental harm, more sophisticated methods of gold recovery were developed and later adopted around the world. New methods of transportation developed as steamships came into regular service. By 1869, railroads were built from California to the eastern United States. At its peak, technological advances reached a point where significant financing was required, increasing the proportion of gold companies to individual miners. Gold worth tens of billions of today's US dollars was recovered, which led to great wealth for a few, though many who participated in the California gold rush earned little more than they had started with.

== History ==
=== Earlier discoveries ===
Gold was discovered in California as early as March 9, 1842, at Rancho San Francisco, in the mountains north of present-day Los Angeles. Californian native Francisco Lopez was searching for stray horses and stopped on the bank of a small creek (in today's Placerita Canyon), about 3 miles (4.8 km) east of present-day Newhall, and about 35 miles (56 km) northwest of Los Angeles. While the horses grazed, Lopez dug up some wild onions and found a small gold nugget in the roots among the bulbs. He looked further and found more gold. Lopez took the gold to authorities who confirmed its worth. Lopez and others began to search for other streambeds with gold deposits in the area. They found several in the northeastern section of the forest, within present-day Ventura County. In November, some of the gold was sent to the U.S. Mint, but otherwise attracted little notice. In 1843, Lopez found gold in San Feliciano Canyon near his first discovery. Mexican miners from Sonora worked the placer deposits until 1846. Minor finds of gold in California were also made by Mission Indians prior to 1848. The friars instructed them to keep its location secret to avoid a gold rush.

=== Marshall's discovery ===
1854 illustration of James W. Marshall, discoverer of gold at Sutter's Mill

In January 1847, nine months into the Mexican–American War, the Treaty of Cahuenga was signed, leading to the resolution of the military conflict in Alta California (Upper California). On January 24, 1848, James W. Marshall (Note: A New Jersey native, Marshall came to California in 1844, worked for John Sutter, and began farming. In 1846, he fought against Mokelumne Indians and participated in the Bear Flag Revolt (an attempt to claim California as an independent republic). He then joined John C. Frémont's California Battalion, followed by further military service. When he returned to Sutter's Fort, most of his livestock had vanished.) found shiny metal in the tailrace of a lumber mill he was building for Sacramento pioneer John Sutter—known as Sutter's Mill, near Coloma on the American River. Marshall brought what he found to Sutter, and the two privately tested the metal. After the tests showed that it was gold, Sutter expressed dismay, wanting to keep the news quiet because he feared what would happen to his plans for an agricultural empire if there were a gold rush in the region. The Mexican–American War ended on May 30 with the ratification of the Treaty of Guadalupe Hidalgo, which formally transferred California to the United States.

Having sworn all concerned at the mill to secrecy, in February 1848, Sutter sent Charles Bennett to Monterey to meet with Colonel Mason, the chief U.S. official in California, to secure the mineral rights of the land where the mill stood. Bennett was not to tell anyone of the discovery of gold, but when he stopped at Benicia, he heard talk about the discovery of coal near Mount Diablo, and he blurted out the discovery of gold. He continued to San Francisco, where again, he could not keep the secret. At Monterey, Mason declined to make any judgement of title to lands and mineral rights, and Bennett for the third time revealed the gold discovery.

By March 1848, rumors of the discovery were confirmed by San Francisco newspaper publisher and merchant Samuel Brannan. Brannan hurriedly set up a store to sell gold prospecting supplies, and he walked through the streets of San Francisco, holding aloft a vial of gold, shouting "Gold! Gold! Gold from the American River!"

On August 19, 1848, The New York Herald was the first major newspaper on the East Coast to report the discovery of gold. On December 5, 1848, US president James K. Polk confirmed the discovery of gold in an address to Congress. As a result, individuals seeking to benefit from the gold rush—later called the "forty-niners"—began moving to the Gold Country of California or "Mother Lode" from other countries and from other parts of the United States. As Sutter had feared, his business plans were ruined after his workers left in search of gold, and squatters took over his land and stole his crops and cattle.

San Francisco had been a tiny settlement before the rush began. When residents learned about the discovery, it at first became a ghost town of abandoned ships and businesses, but then boomed as merchants and new people arrived. The population of San Francisco increased quickly from about 1,000 in 1848 to 25,000 full-time residents by 1850. Miners lived in tents, wood shanties, or deck cabins removed from abandoned ships. There were no churches or religious services in the rapidly growing city, which prompted missionaries like William Taylor to meet the need, where he held services in the street, using a barrel head as his pulpit. Crowds would gather to listen to his sermons, and before long he received enough generous donations from successful gold miners and built San Francisco's first church.

=== Transportation and supplies ===
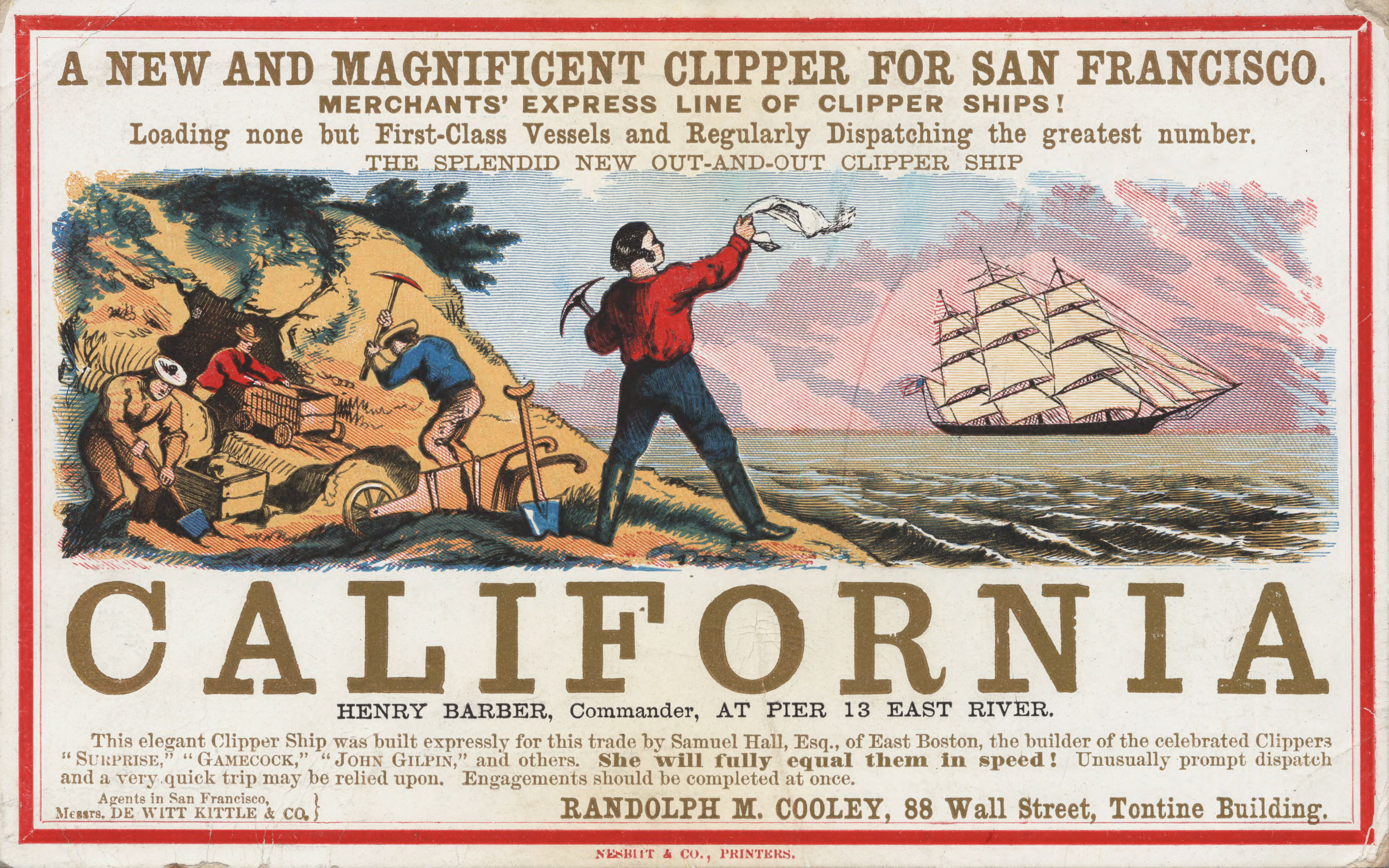
Advertisement about sailing to California, c. 1850

In what has been referred to as the "first world-class gold rush," there was no easy way to travel to California; forty-niners faced hardship and often death on the way. At first, most Argonauts, as they were also known, traveled by sea. From the East Coast, a sailing voyage around the tip of South America would take four to five months, and cover approximately 18,000 nautical miles (21,000 mi; 33,000 km). An alternative was to sail to the Atlantic side of the Isthmus of Panama, take canoes and mules for a week through the jungle, and then on the Pacific side, wait for a ship sailing for San Francisco. There was also a route across Mexico starting at Veracruz. The companies providing such transportation generated vast amounts of wealth among their owners, including the U.S. Mail Steamship Company, the federally subsidized Pacific Mail Steamship Company, and the Accessory Transit Company. Many gold-seekers took the overland route across the continental United States, particularly along the California Trail. Each of these routes had its own deadly hazards, from shipwreck to typhoid fever and cholera. In the early years of the rush, much of the population growth in the San Francisco area was due to steamship travel from New York City through overland portages in Nicaragua and Panama and then back up by steamship to San Francisco.

While traveling, many steamships from the eastern seaboard required the passengers to bring kits, which were typically full of personal belongings such as clothes, guidebooks, tools, etc. In addition to personal belongings, Argonauts were required to bring barrels full of beef, biscuits, butter, pork, rice, and salt. While on the steamships, travelers could talk to each other, smoke, fish, and engage in other activities depending on the ship they traveled. Still, the dominant activity held throughout the steamships was gambling, which was ironic, since segregation between wealth gaps was prominent throughout the ships. Everything was segregated between the rich and the poor. There were different levels of travel one could pay for to get to California. The cheaper steamships tended to have longer routes. In contrast, the more expensive ones would get passengers to California quicker. There were clear social and economic distinctions between those who traveled together, being that those who spent more money would receive accommodations that others were not allowed. They would do this with the clear intent to distinguish their higher class power over those that could not afford those accommodations.

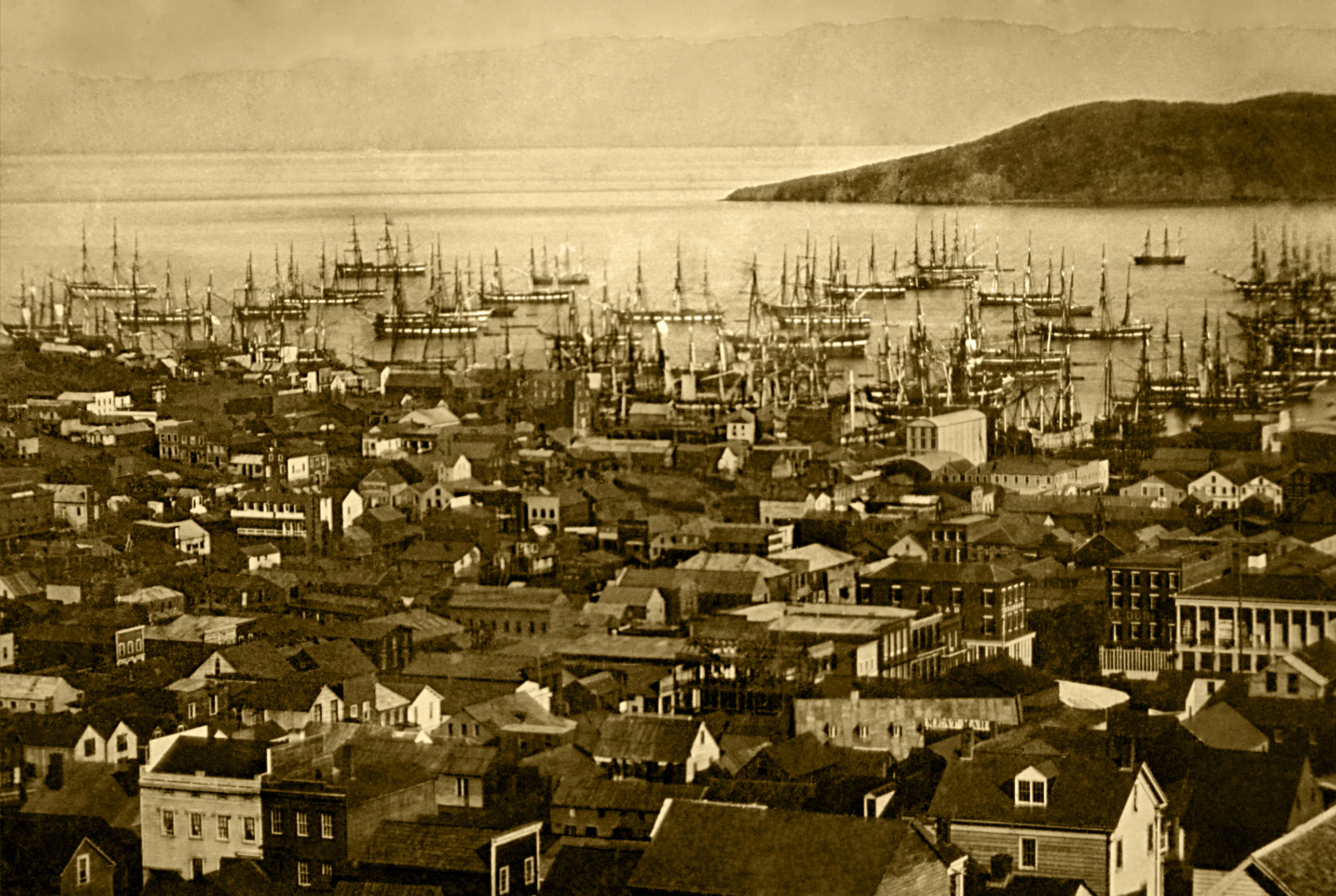
Merchant ships fill San Francisco Bay, 1850–51.

Supply ships arrived in San Francisco with goods to supply the needs of the growing population. When hundreds of ships were abandoned after their crews deserted to go into the goldfields, many ships were converted to warehouses, stores, taverns, hotels, and one into a jail. As the city expanded and new places were needed on which to build, many ships were destroyed and used as landfills.

=== Other developments ===
Within a few years, there was an important but lesser-known surge of prospectors into far Northern California, specifically into present-day Siskiyou, Shasta and Trinity Counties. Discovery of gold nuggets at the site of present-day Yreka in 1851 brought thousands of gold-seekers up the Siskiyou Trail and throughout California's northern counties.

Settlements of the gold rush era, such as Portuguese Flat on the Sacramento River, sprang into existence and then faded. The gold rush town of Weaverville on the Trinity River today retains the oldest continuously used Taoist temple in California, a legacy of Chinese miners who came. While there are not many Gold Rush era ghost towns still in existence, the remains of the once-bustling town of Shasta have been preserved in a California State Historic Park in Northern California.

By 1850, most of the easily accessible gold had been collected, and attention turned to extracting gold from more difficult locations. Faced with gold increasingly difficult to retrieve, Americans began to drive out foreigners to get at the most accessible gold that remained. The new California State Legislature passed a foreign miners tax of twenty dollars per month ($770 per month as of 2025), and American prospectors began organized attacks on foreign miners, particularly Latin Americans and Chinese.

In addition, the huge numbers of newcomers were driving Native Americans out of their traditional hunting, fishing, and food-gathering areas. To protect their homes and livelihood, some Native Americans responded by attacking the miners. This provoked counter-attacks on native villages. The Native Americans, out-gunned, were often slaughtered. Those who escaped massacres were many times unable to survive without access to their food-gathering areas, and they starved to death. Novelist and poet Joaquin Miller vividly captured one such attack in his semi-autobiographical work, Life Amongst the Modocs.

== Forty-niners ==
The first people to rush to the goldfields, beginning in the spring of 1848, were the residents of California themselves—primarily agriculturally oriented Americans and Europeans living in Northern California, along with Native Californians and some Californios (Spanish-speaking Californians; at the time, commonly referred to in English as simply 'Californians'). These first miners were sometimes entire families, of all ethnicities, in which everyone helped in the effort. Women and children were sometimes found panning next to the men. Some enterprising families set up boarding houses to accommodate the influx of men; in such cases, the women could bring in steady income while their husbands searched for gold.

Word of the gold rush spread slowly at first. The earliest gold-seekers were people who lived near California or people who heard the news from ships on the fastest sailing routes from California. The first large group of Americans to arrive were several thousand Oregonians who came down the Siskiyou Trail. Next came people from the Sandwich Islands, and several thousand Latin Americans, including people from Mexico, from Peru and from as far away as Chile, both by ship and overland. By the end of 1848, some 6,000 Argonauts had come to California.

Only a small number (probably fewer than 500) traveled overland from the United States that year. Some of these "forty-eighters", as the earliest gold-seekers were sometimes called, were able to collect large amounts of easily accessible gold—in some cases, thousands of dollars' worth each day. Even ordinary prospectors averaged daily gold finds worth 10 to 15 times the daily wage of a laborer on the East Coast. A person could work for six months in the goldfields and find the equivalent of six years' wages back home. Some hoped to get rich quick and return home, and others wished to settle in California.

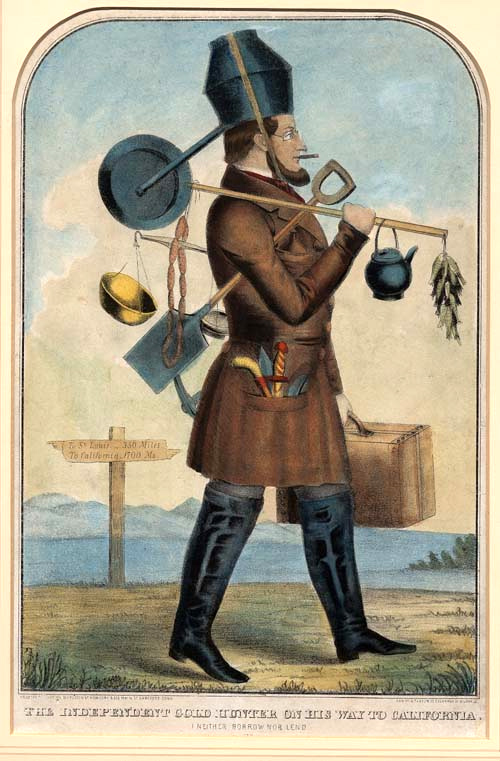
Independent Gold Hunter on His Way to California, c. 1850 (Note: The gold hunter is loaded down with every conceivable appliance, much of which would be useless in California. The prospector says (in a caption on some versions): "I am sorry I did not follow the advice of Granny and go around the Horn, through the Straights, or by Chagres [Panama].")

By the beginning of 1849, word of the gold rush had spread around the world, and an overwhelming number of gold-seekers and merchants began to arrive from virtually every continent. The largest group of forty-niners in 1849 were Americans from the East Coast, arriving by the tens of thousands overland across the continent and along various sailing routes (the term "forty-niner" was derived from the year 1849). Many from the East Coast negotiated a crossing of the Appalachian Mountains, taking to riverboats in Pennsylvania, poling the keelboats to Missouri River wagon train assembly ports, and then traveling in a wagon train along the California Trail. Many others came by way of the Isthmus of Panama and the steamships of the Pacific Mail Steamship Company. Australians and New Zealanders picked up the news from ships carrying Hawaiian newspapers, and thousands, infected with "gold fever", boarded ships for California.

Forty-niners came from Latin America, particularly from the Mexican mining districts near Sonora and Chile. Gold-seekers and merchants from Asia, primarily from China, began arriving in 1849, at first in modest numbers to Gum San ("Gold Mountain"), the name given to California in Chinese. The first immigrants from Europe, reeling from the effects of the Revolutions of 1848 and with a longer distance to travel, began arriving in late 1849, mostly from France, with some Germans, Italians, and Britons.

It is estimated that approximately 90,000 people arrived in California in 1849—about half by land and half by sea. Of these, perhaps 50,000 to 60,000 were Americans, and the rest were from other countries. By 1855, it is estimated at least 300,000 gold-seekers, merchants, and other immigrants had arrived in California from around the world. The largest group continued to be Americans, but there were tens of thousands each of Mexicans, Chinese, Britons, Australians, French, and Latin Americans, together with many smaller groups of miners, such as African Americans, Filipinos, Basques and people from the Ottoman Empire.

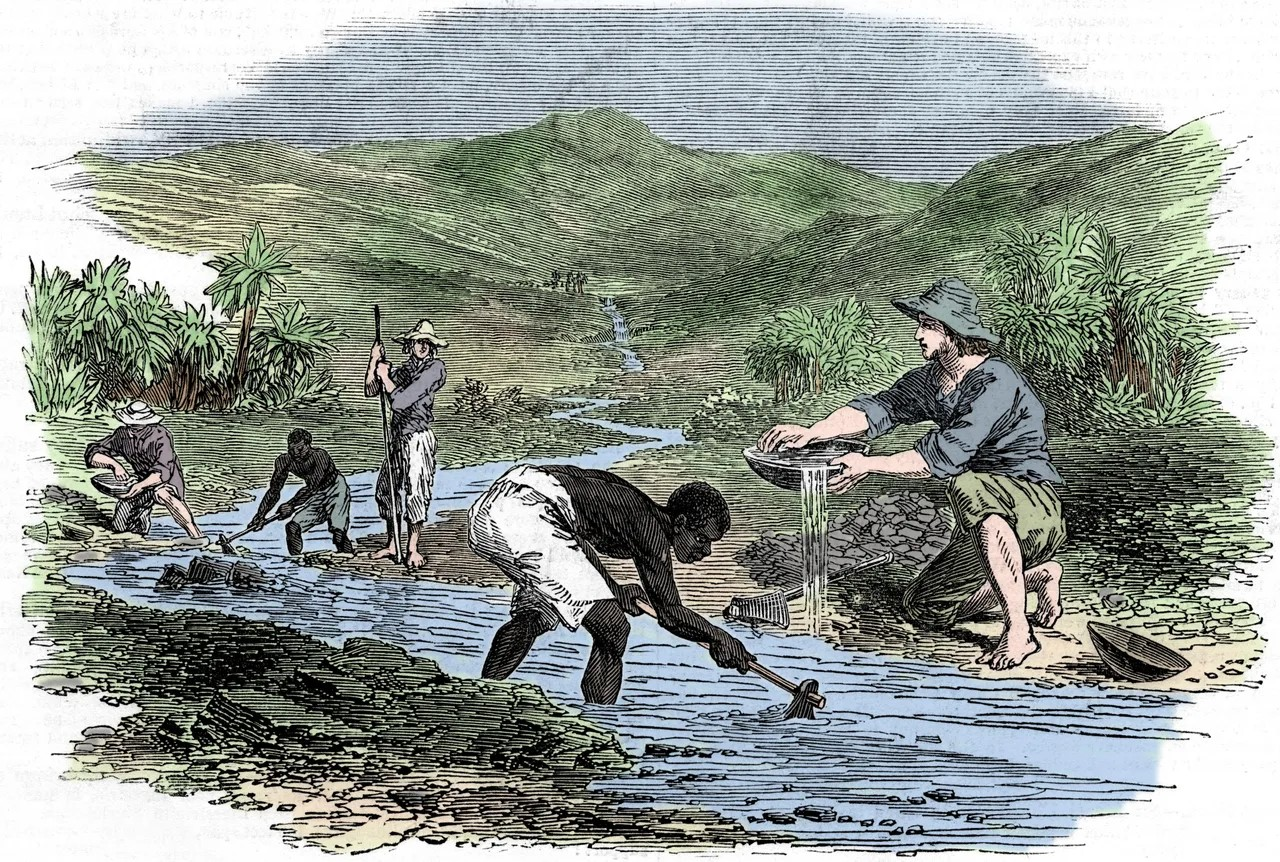
African American slaves working for their masters who had come to California in search of gold, 1849.

People from small villages in the hills near Genoa, Italy, were among the first to settle permanently in the Sierra Nevada foothills; they brought with them traditional agricultural skills, developed to survive cold winters. A modest number of miners were of African ancestry (probably fewer than 4,000) had come from the Southern States, the Caribbean and Brazil. Some of them are African American slaves brought by their masters.

A number of immigrants were from China. Several hundred Chinese arrived in California in 1849 and 1850, and in 1852 more than 20,000 landed in San Francisco. Their distinctive dress and appearance was highly recognizable in the goldfields. Chinese miners suffered enormously, enduring violent racism from white miners who aimed their frustrations at foreigners. Further animosity toward the Chinese led to legislation such as the Chinese Exclusion Act and Foreign Miners Tax.

There were also women in the gold rush. However, their numbers were small. Of the 40,000 people who arrived by ship to the San Francisco Bay in 1849, only 700 were women (including those who were poor, wealthy, entrepreneurs, prostitutes, single, and married). They were of various ethnicities including Anglo-American, African-American, Hispanic, Native, European, Chinese, and Jewish. The reasons they came varied: some came with their husbands, refusing to be left behind to fend for themselves, some came because their husbands sent for them, and others came (singles and widows) for the adventure and economic opportunities. On the trail many people died from accidents, cholera, fever, and myriad other causes, and many women became widows before even setting eyes on California. While in California, women became widows quite frequently due to mining accidents, disease, or mining disputes of their husbands. Life in the goldfields offered opportunities for women to break from their traditional work.

Because of many thousands of people flooding into California at Sacramento and San Francisco and surrounding areas, the Methodist church deemed it necessary to send missionaries there to preach the gospel, as churches in that part of the state were not to be found. The first missionary to arrive was William Taylor who arrived in San Francisco in September 1849. For many months he preached in the streets to hundreds of people without salary, and ultimately after saving often generous donations from successful miners, he built and established the first Methodist church in California, and California's first professional hospital.

== Legal rights ==
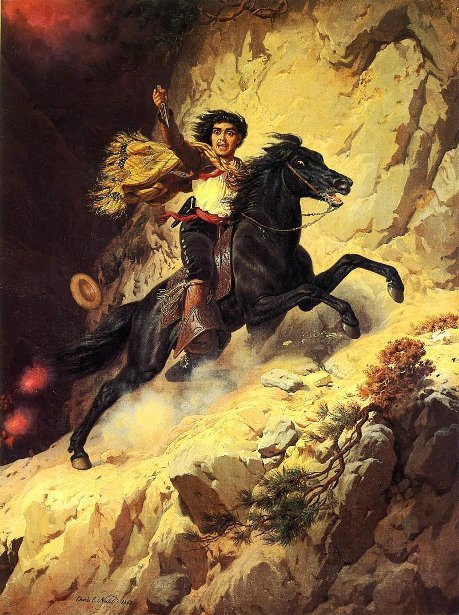
Joaquín Murrieta, called the "Robin Hood of California", was a notorious outlaw during the gold rush.

When the Gold Rush began, the California goldfields were peculiarly lawless places. When gold was discovered at Sutter's Mill, California was still technically part of Mexico, under American military occupation as the result of the Mexican–American War. With the signing of the treaty ending the war on February 2, 1848, California became a possession of the United States, but it was not a formal "territory" and did not become a state until September 9, 1850. California existed in the unusual condition of a region under military control. There was no civil legislature, executive or judicial body for the entire region. Local residents operated under a confusing and changing mixture of Mexican rules, American principles, and personal dictates. Lax enforcement of federal laws, such as the Fugitive Slave Act of 1850, encouraged the arrival of free blacks and escaped slaves.

While the treaty ending the Mexican–American War obliged the United States to honor Mexican land grants, almost all the goldfields were outside those grants. Instead, the goldfields were primarily on "public land", meaning land formally owned by the United States government. However, there were no legal rules yet in place, and no practical enforcement mechanisms.

The benefit to the forty-niners was that the gold was simply "free for the taking" at first. In the goldfields at the beginning, there was no private property, no licensing fees, and no taxes. The miners informally adapted Mexican mining law that had existed in California. For example, the rules attempted to balance the rights of early arrivers at a site with later arrivers; a "claim" could be "staked" by a prospector, but that claim was valid only as long as it was being actively worked.

Miners worked at a claim only long enough to determine its potential. If a claim was deemed as low-value—as most were—miners would abandon the site in search of a better one. In the case where a claim was abandoned or not worked upon, other miners would "claim-jump" the land. "Claim-jumping" meant that a miner began work on a previously claimed site. Disputes were often handled personally and violently, and were sometimes addressed by groups of prospectors acting as arbitrators. This often led to heightened ethnic tensions. In some areas the influx of many prospectors could lead to a reduction of the existing claim size by simple pressure.

== Development of gold-recovery techniques ==
Approximately four hundred million years ago, California lay at the bottom of a large sea; underwater volcanoes deposited lava and minerals (including gold) onto the sea floor. By tectonic forces these minerals and rocks came to the surface of the Sierra Nevada, and eroded. Water carried the exposed gold downstream and deposited it in quiet gravel beds along the sides of old rivers and streams. The forty-niners first focused their efforts on these deposits of gold.

Because the gold in the California gravel beds was so richly concentrated, early forty-niners were able to retrieve loose gold flakes and nuggets with their hands, or simply "pan" for gold in rivers and streams. Panning cannot take place on a large scale, and industrious miners and groups of miners graduated to placer mining, using "cradles" and "rockers" or "long-toms" to process larger volumes of gravel. Miners would also engage in "coyoteing", a method that involved digging a shaft 6 to 13 meters (20 to 43 ft) deep into placer deposits along a stream. Tunnels were then dug in all directions to reach the richest veins of pay dirt.

In the most complex placer mining, groups of prospectors would divert the water from an entire river into a sluice alongside the river and then dig for gold in the newly exposed river bottom. Mixed groups of Chileans and Mexicans were the first to apply this technique which required collaborative work which was something that was more common among Chileans when compared to Anglo Americans.

Modern estimates are that as much as 12 million ounces (370 t) of gold were removed in the first five years of the Gold Rush.

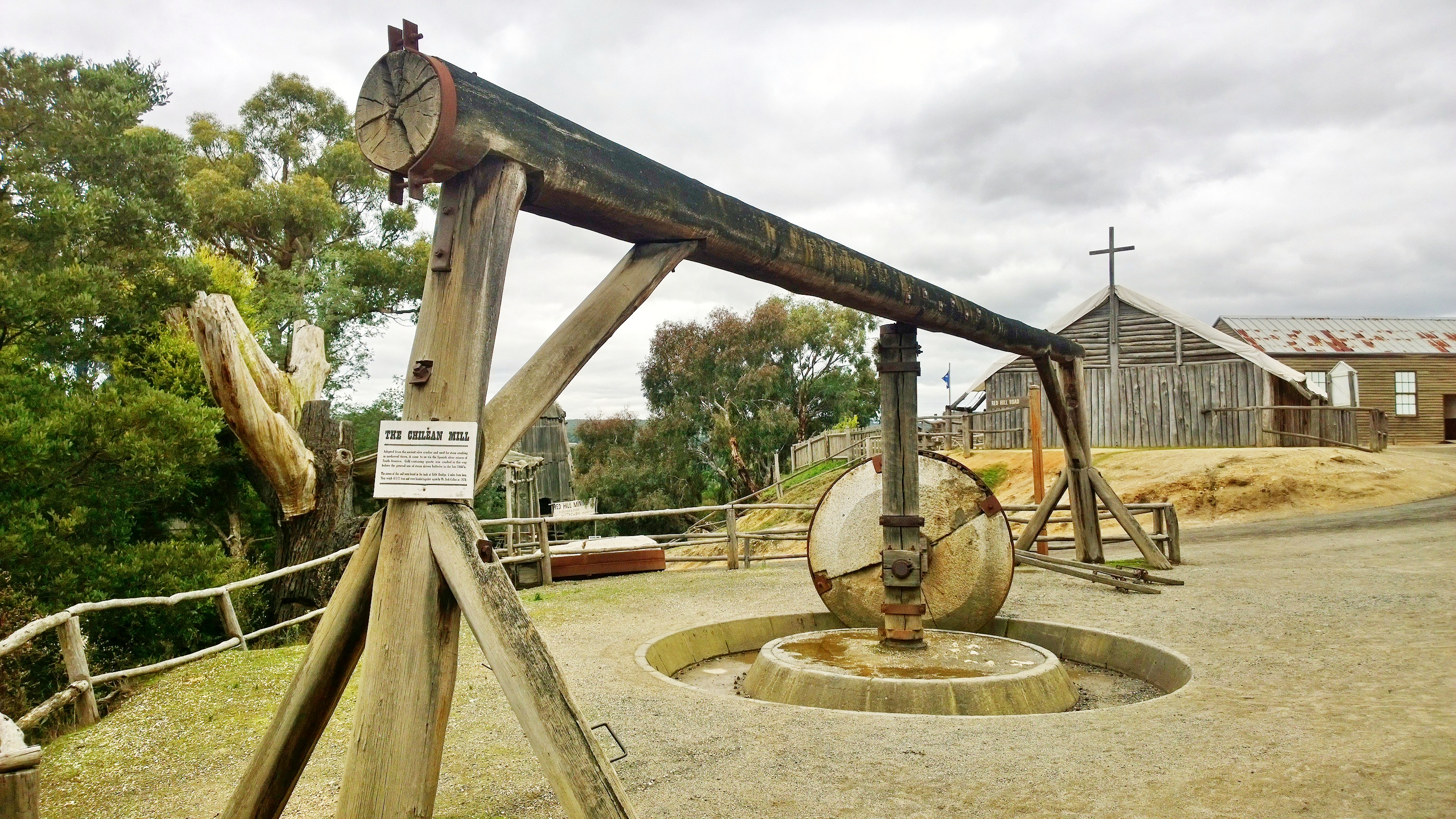
Replica of a horse-powered Chilean mill which Chileans introduced to California during the gold rush

Chilean miners, coming from an area with a long mining tradition, were influential in California. Many Euroamerican miners learned from them and from Sonorans. Chileans are credited to have introduced the batea gold pan (dish made of wood) and the trapiche to California. The trapiche became known as the Chilean mill and compared favourable to similar technology introduced by Mexicans.

=== Hydraulic mining and dredging ===
In the next stage, by 1853, hydraulic mining was used on ancient gold-bearing gravel beds on hillsides and bluffs in the goldfields. In a modern style of hydraulic mining first developed in California, and later used around the world, a high-pressure hose directed a powerful stream or jet of water at gold-bearing gravel beds. The loosened gravel and gold would then pass over sluices, with the gold settling to the bottom where it was collected. By the mid-1880s, it is estimated that 11 million troy ounces (340 t) of gold (worth approximately US$15 billion at December 2010 prices) had been recovered by hydraulic mining.

A byproduct of these extraction methods was that large amounts of gravel, silt, heavy metals, and other pollutants went into streams and rivers. Court rulings (1882 Gold Run and 1884 "Sawyer Act") and 1893 federal legislation limited hydraulic mining in California. As of 1999 many areas still bear the scars of hydraulic mining, since the resulting exposed earth and downstream gravel deposits do not support plant life.

After the gold rush had concluded, gold recovery operations continued. The final stage to recover loose gold was to prospect for gold that had slowly washed down into the flat river bottoms and sandbars of California's Central Valley and other gold-bearing areas of California (such as Scott Valley in Siskiyou County). By the late 1890s, dredging technology (also invented in California) had become economical, and it is estimated that more than 20 million troy ounces (620 t) were recovered by dredging.

=== Hard-rock mining ===
Both during the gold rush and in the decades that followed, gold-seekers also engaged in hard-rock mining, extracting the gold directly from the rock that contained it (typically quartz), usually by digging and blasting to follow and remove veins of the gold-bearing quartz. Chilean miners in particular had experience in this type of mining. Once the gold-bearing rocks were brought to the surface, the rocks were crushed and the gold separated, either using separation in water, using its density difference from quartz sand, or by washing the sand over copper plates coated with mercury (with which gold forms an amalgam). Loss of mercury in the amalgamation process was a source of environmental contamination. Eventually, hard-rock mining became the single largest source of gold produced in the Gold Country. The total production of gold in California from then until now is estimated at 118 million troy ounces (3,700 t).

=== Image gallery ===
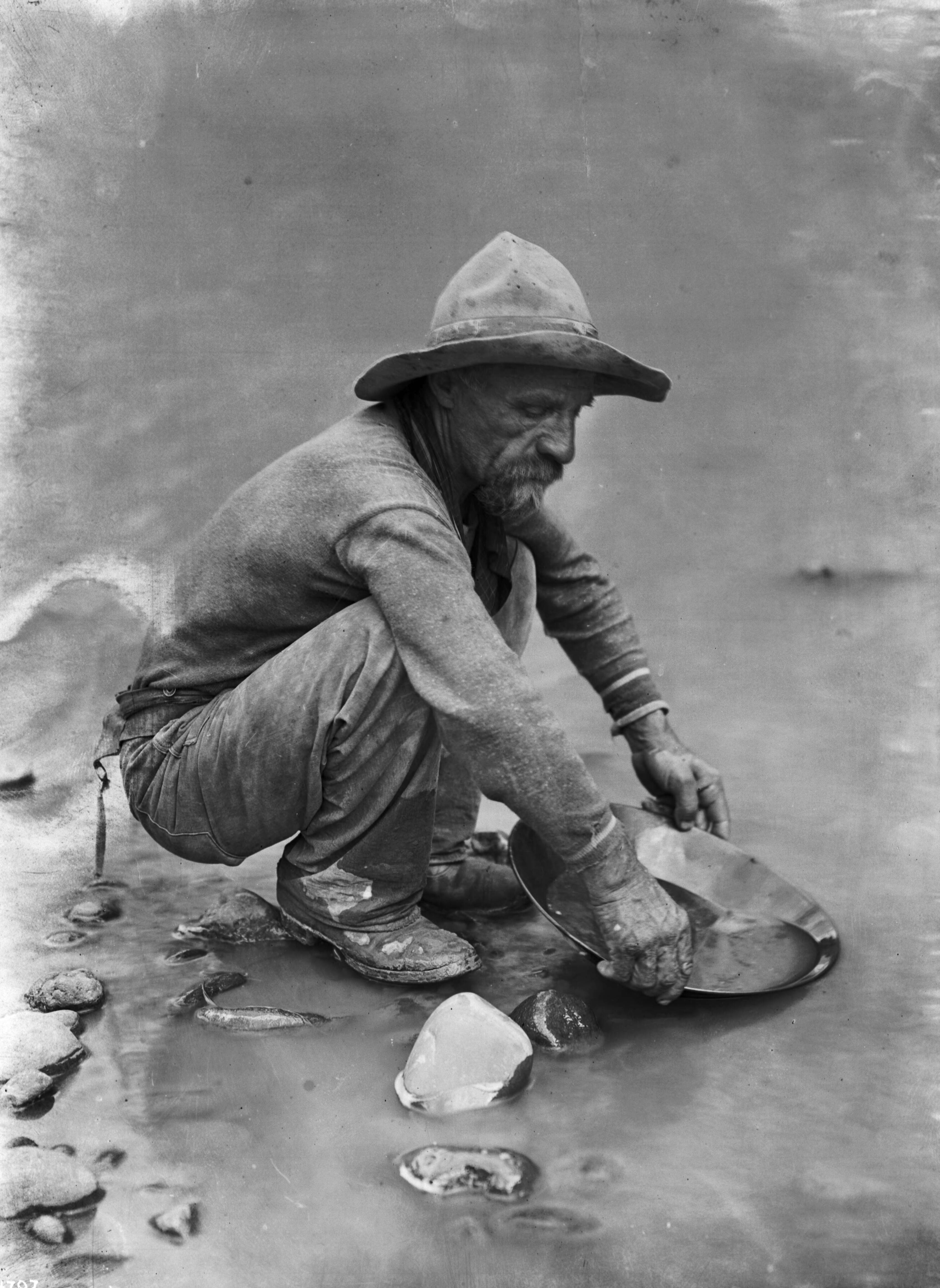
Forty-niner panning for gold

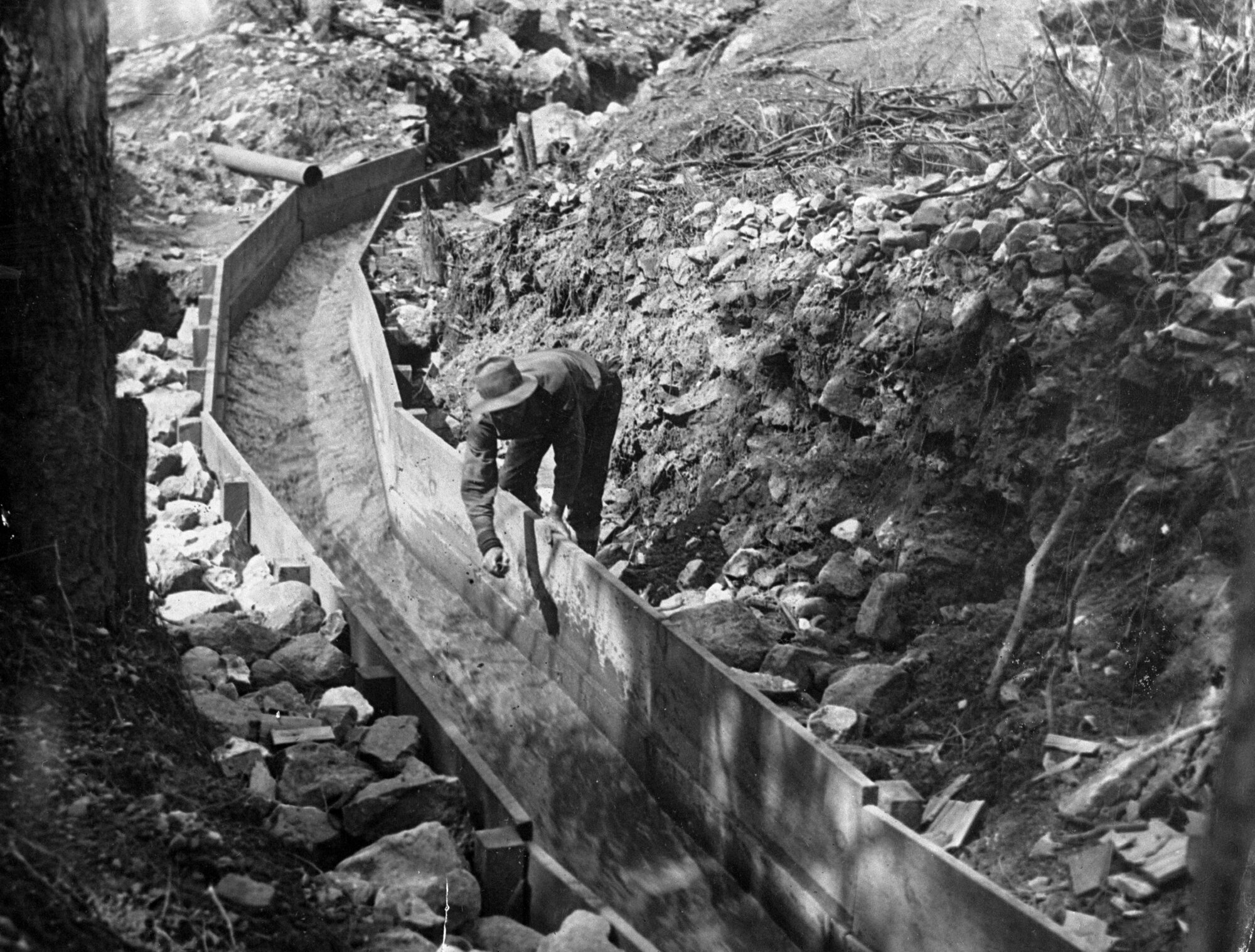
Sluice for separation of gold from dirt using water

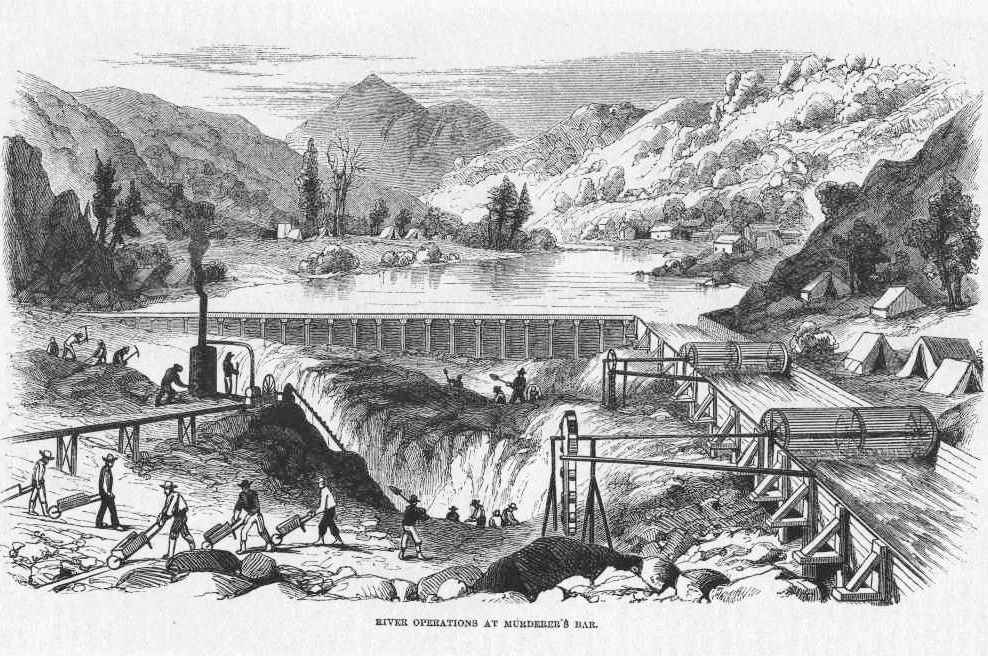
Excavating a riverbed after the water has been diverted

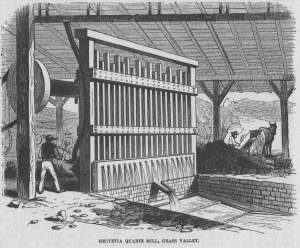
Crushing quartz ore prior to washing out gold

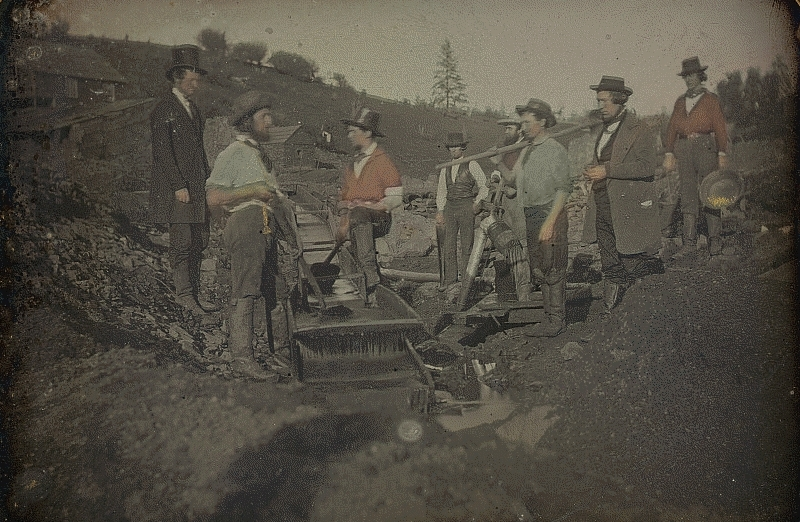
California gold miners with long tom, c. 1850–1852

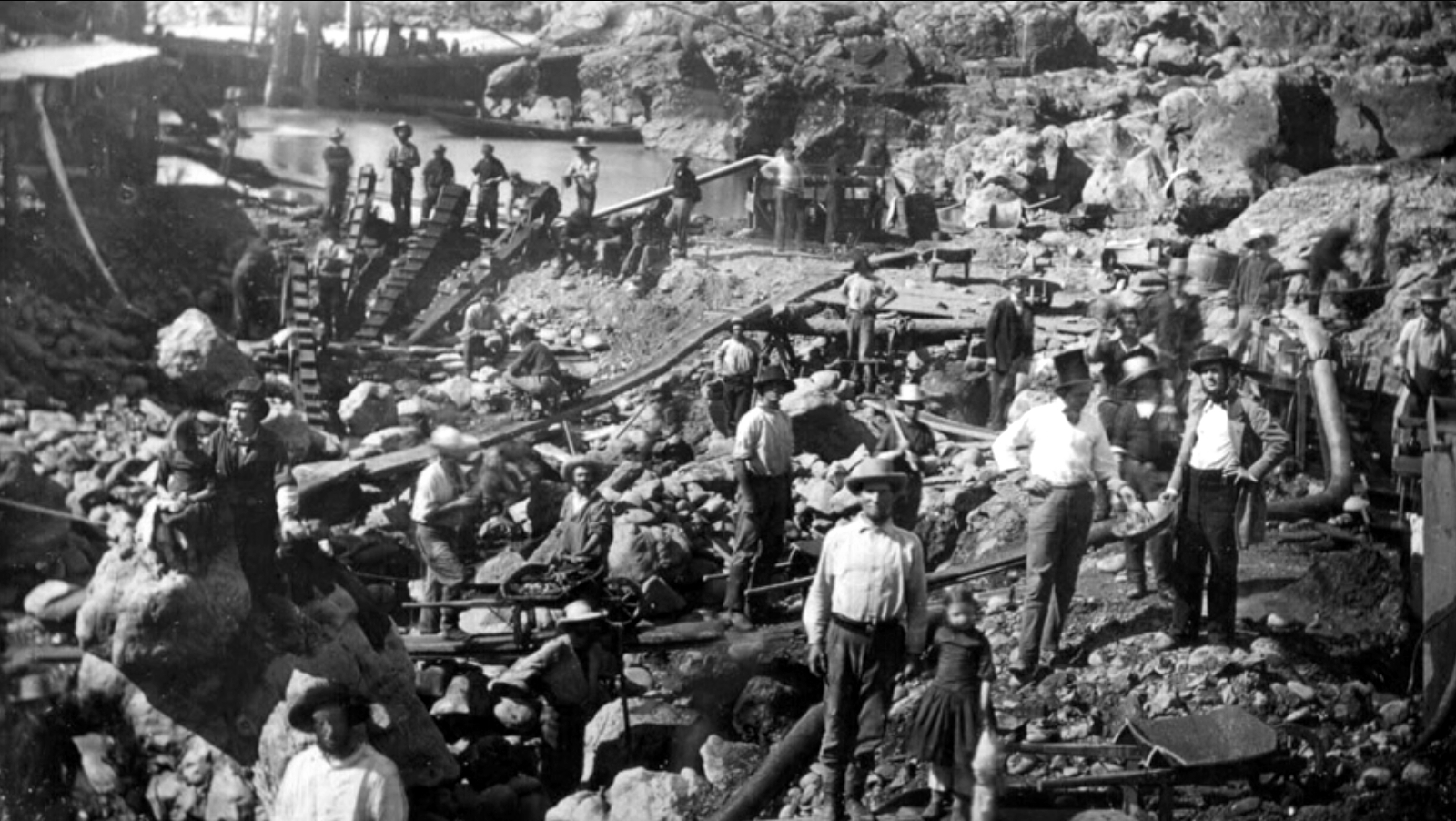
Mining on the American River near Sacramento, c. 1852

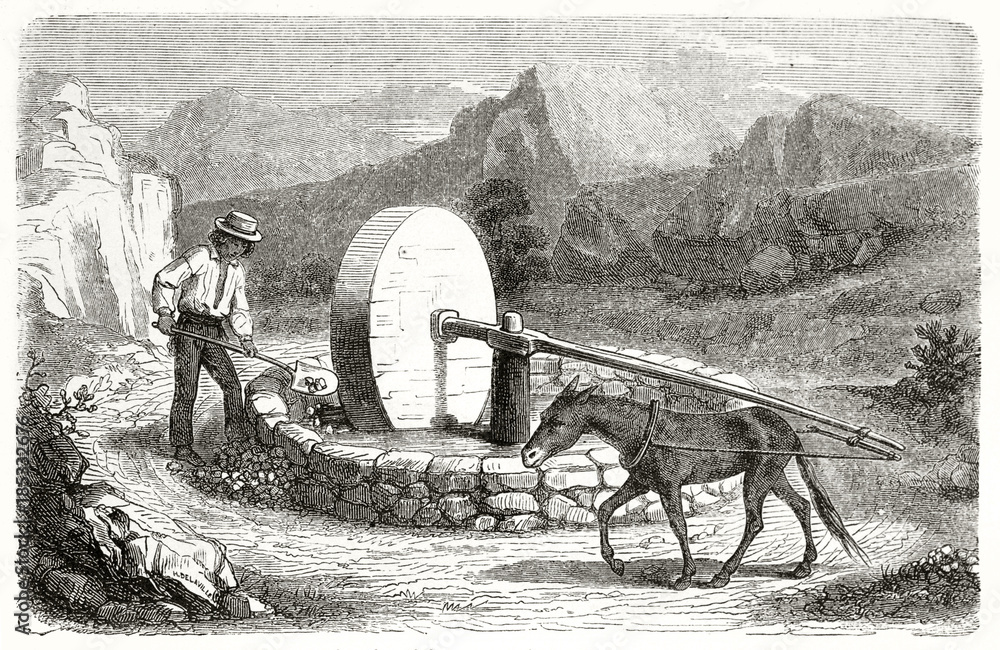
Californio miner processing ore, c. 1862

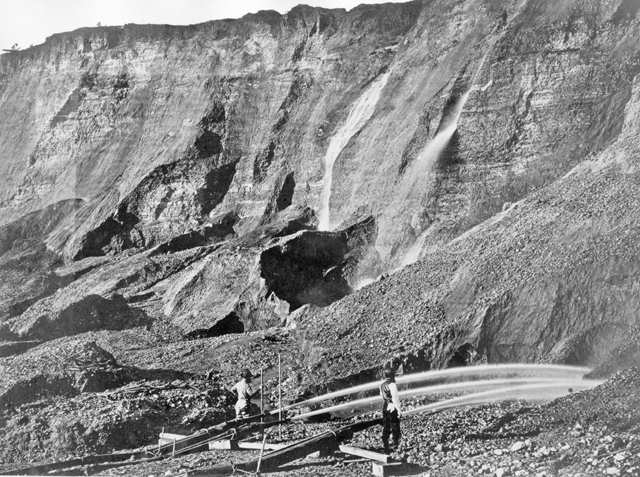
Excavating a gravel bed with jets, c. 1863

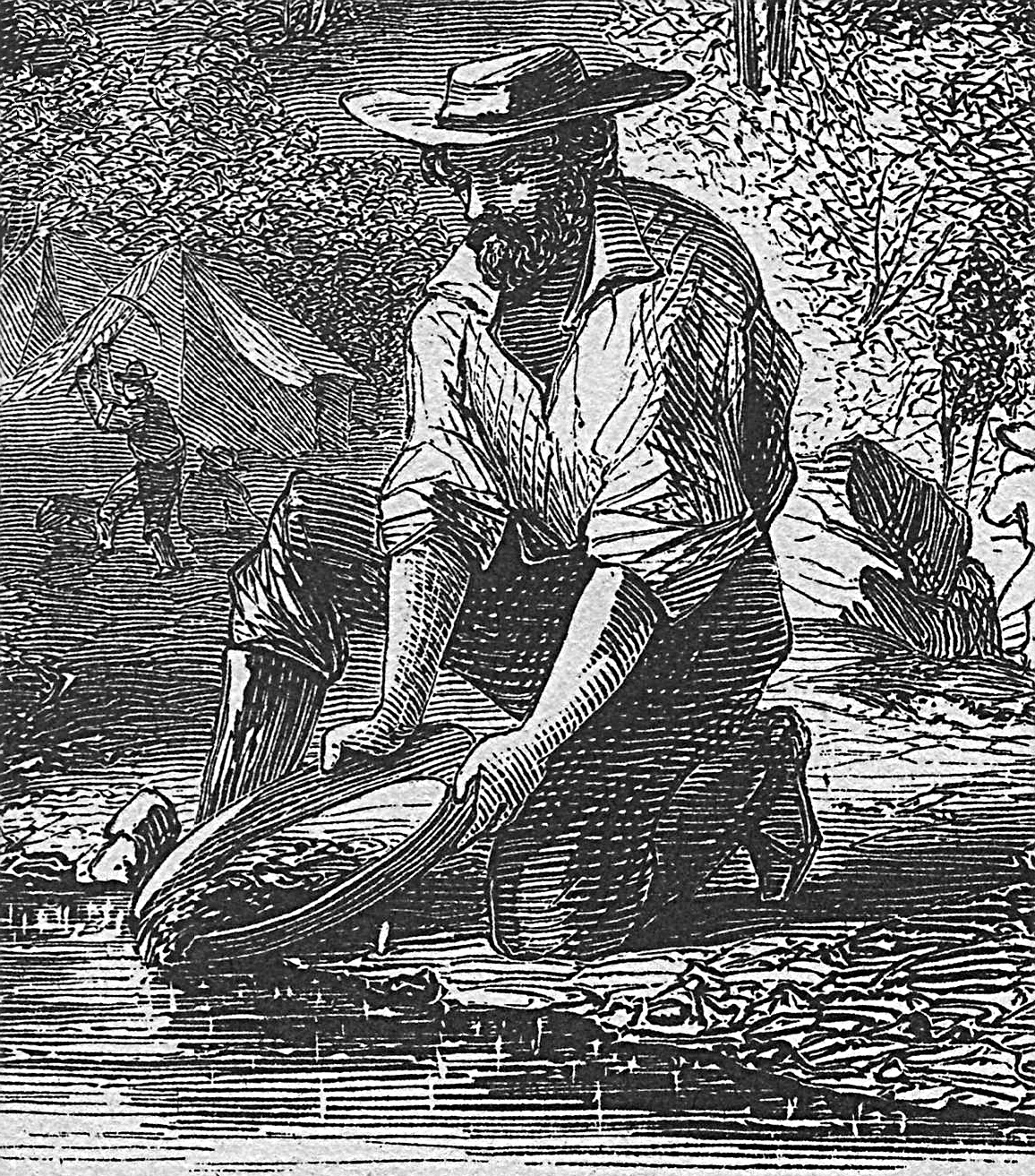
Panning on the Mokelumne River (1860 illustration)

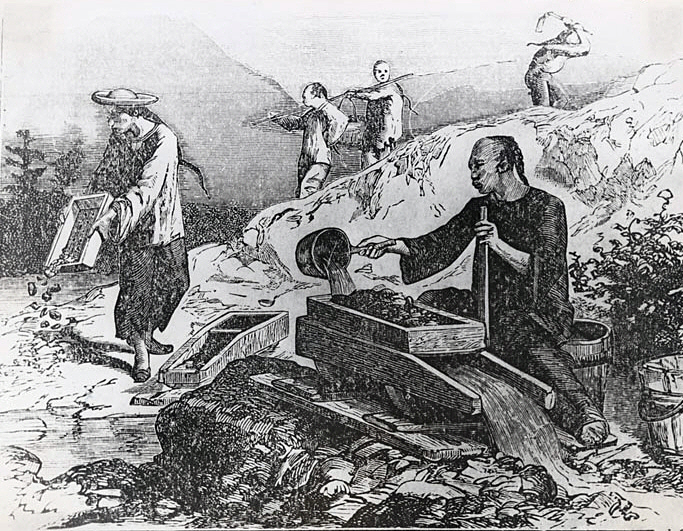
Chinese gold miners in California (illustration)

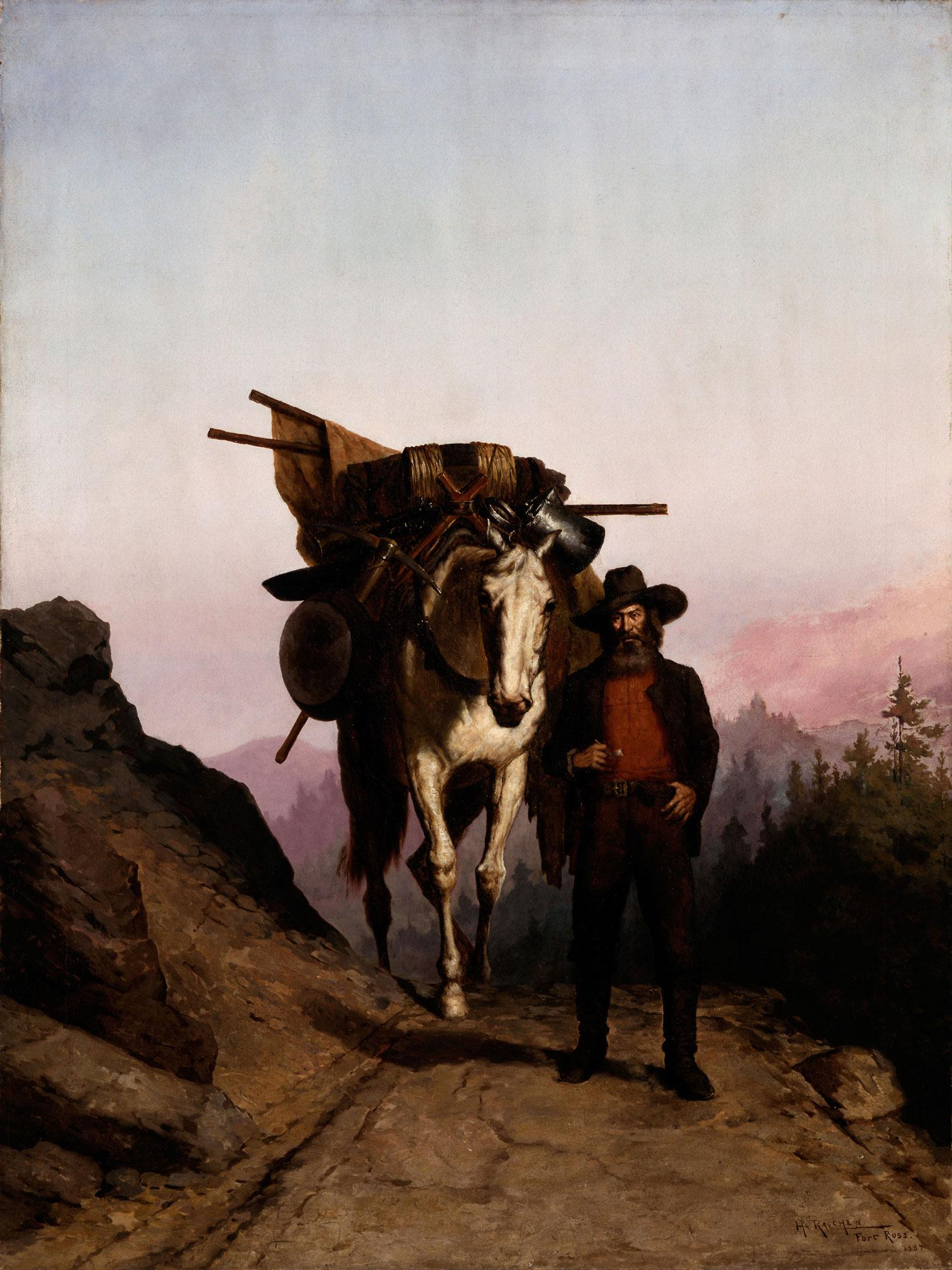
Henry Raschen, California Miner with Pack Horse, 1887, oil on canvas

== Profits ==
Recent scholarship confirms that merchants made far more money than miners during the gold rush. The wealthiest man in California during the early years of the rush was Samuel Brannan, a tireless self-promoter, shopkeeper and newspaper publisher. Brannan opened the first supply stores in Sacramento, Coloma, and other spots in the goldfields. Just as the rush began, he purchased all the prospecting supplies available in San Francisco and resold them at a substantial profit.

Some gold-seekers made a significant amount of money. On average, half the gold-seekers made a modest profit, after taking all expenses into account; economic historians have suggested that white miners were more successful than black, Indian, or Chinese miners. However, taxes such as the California foreign miners tax passed in 1851, targeted mainly Latino miners and kept them from making as much money as whites, who did not have any taxes imposed on them. In California most late arrivals made little or wound up losing money. Similarly, many unlucky merchants set up in settlements that disappeared, or which succumbed to one of the calamitous fires that swept the towns that sprang up.

Other businessmen reaped great rewards in retail, shipping, entertainment, lodging, or transportation. Boardinghouses, food preparation, sewing, and laundry were highly profitable businesses often run by women (married, single, or widowed) who realized men would pay well for a service done by a woman. Brothels also brought in large profits, especially when combined with saloons and gaming houses.

By 1855, the economic climate had changed dramatically. Gold could be retrieved profitably from the goldfields only by medium to large groups of workers, either in partnerships or as employees. By the mid-1850s, it was the owners of these gold-mining companies who made the money. Also, the population and economy of California had become large and diverse enough that money could be made in a wide variety of conventional businesses.

=== Path of the gold ===
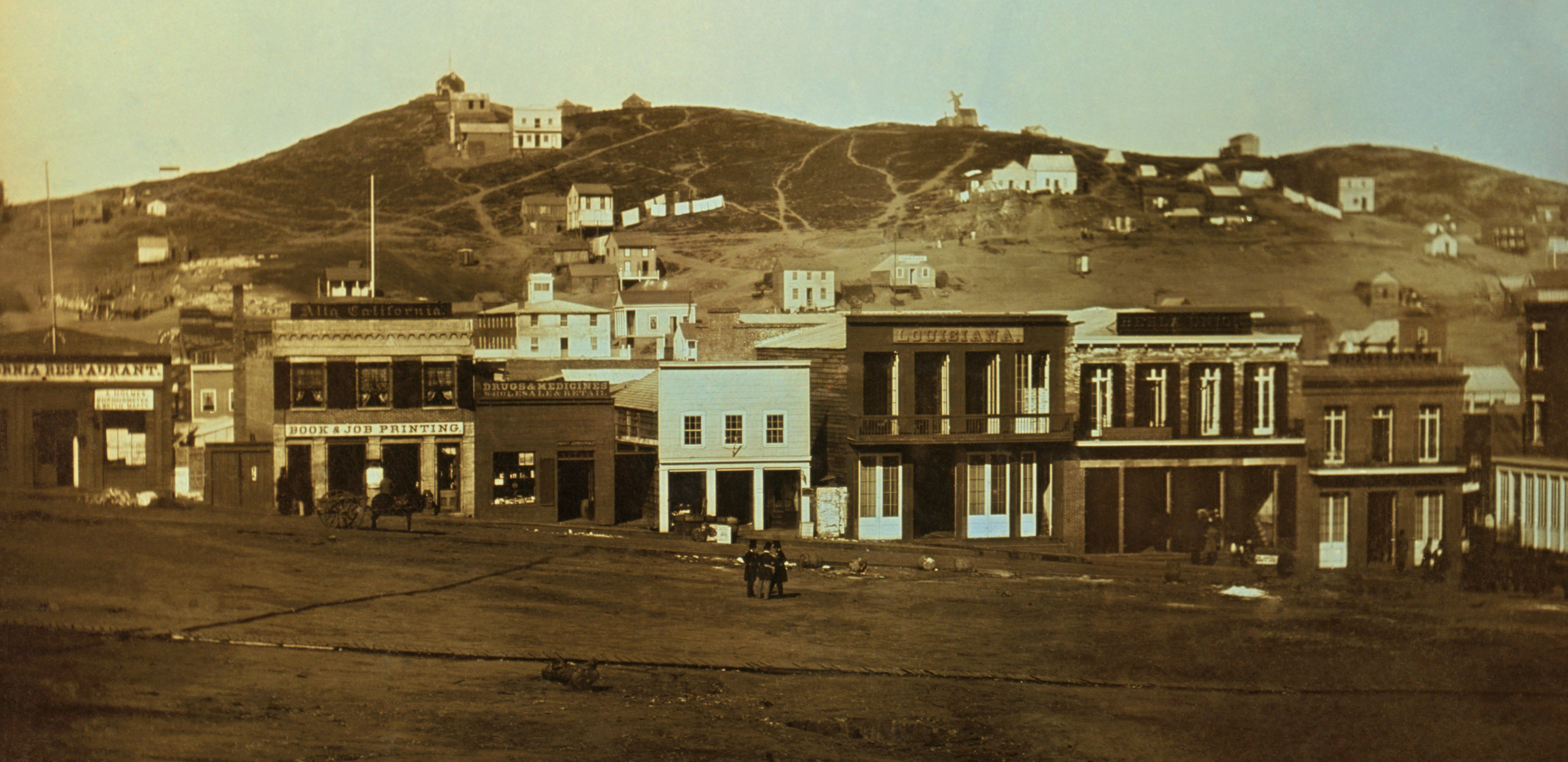
Portsmouth Square, San Francisco, during the gold rush, 1851

Once extracted, the gold itself took many paths. First, much of the gold was used locally to purchase food, supplies and lodging for the miners. It also went towards entertainment, which consisted of anything from a traveling theater to alcohol, gambling, and prostitutes. These transactions often took place using the recently recovered gold, carefully weighed out. These merchants and vendors, in turn, used the gold to purchase supplies from ship captains or packers bringing goods to California.

The gold then left California aboard ships or mules to go to the makers of the goods from around the world. A second path was the Argonauts themselves who, having personally acquired a sufficient amount, sent the gold home, or returned home taking with them their hard-earned "diggings". For example, one estimate is that some US$80 million worth of California gold (equivalent to US$2.8 billion today) was sent to France by French prospectors and merchants.

A majority of the gold went back to New York City brokerage houses.

As the gold rush progressed, local banks and gold dealers issued "banknotes" or "drafts"—locally accepted paper currency—in exchange for gold, and private mints created private gold coins. With the building of the San Francisco Mint in 1854, gold bullion was turned into official United States gold coins for circulation. The gold was also later sent by California banks to U.S. national banks in exchange for national paper currency to be used in the booming California economy.

== Effects ==
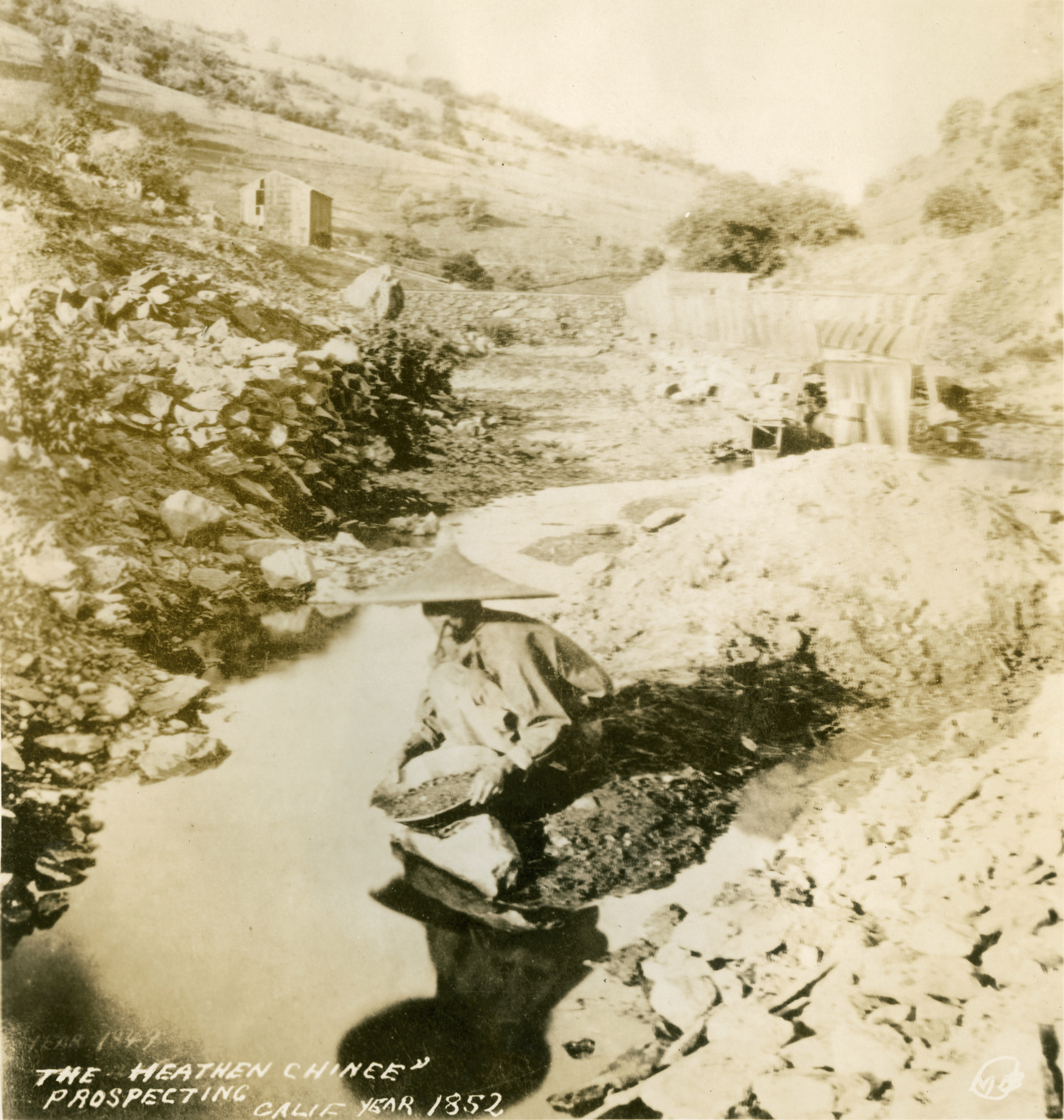
1852 photograph, captioned "The Heathen Chinee Prospecting", indicating prejudice against Chinese gold miners

The arrival of hundreds of thousands of new people in California within a few years, compared to a population of some 15,000 Europeans and Californios beforehand, had many dramatic effects.

A 2017 study attributes the record-long economic expansion of the United States in the recession-free period of 1841–1856 primarily to "a boom in transportation-goods investment following the discovery of gold in California."

=== Government and commerce ===
The gold rush propelled California from a sleepy, little-known backwater to a center of the global imagination and the destination of hundreds of thousands of people. The new immigrants often showed remarkable inventiveness and civic mindedness. For example, in the midst of the gold rush, towns and cities were chartered, a state constitutional convention was convened, a state constitution written, elections held, and representatives sent to Washington, D.C., to negotiate the admission of California as a state.

Large-scale agriculture (California's second "Gold Rush") began during this time. Roads, schools, churches, and civic organizations quickly came into existence. The vast majority of the immigrants were Americans. Pressure grew for better communications and political connections to the rest of the United States, leading to statehood for California on September 9, 1850, in the Compromise of 1850 as the 31st state of the United States.

Between 1847 and 1870, the population of San Francisco increased from 500 to 150,000. The Gold Rush wealth and population increase led to significantly improved transportation between California and the East Coast. The Panama Railway, spanning the Isthmus of Panama, was finished in 1855. Steamships, including those owned by the Pacific Mail Steamship Company, began regular service from San Francisco to Panama, where passengers, goods and mail would take the train across the Isthmus and board steamships headed to the East Coast. One ill-fated journey, that of the S.S. Central America, ended in disaster as the ship sank in a hurricane off the coast of the Carolinas in 1857, with approximately three tons of California gold aboard.

=== Native Americans ===
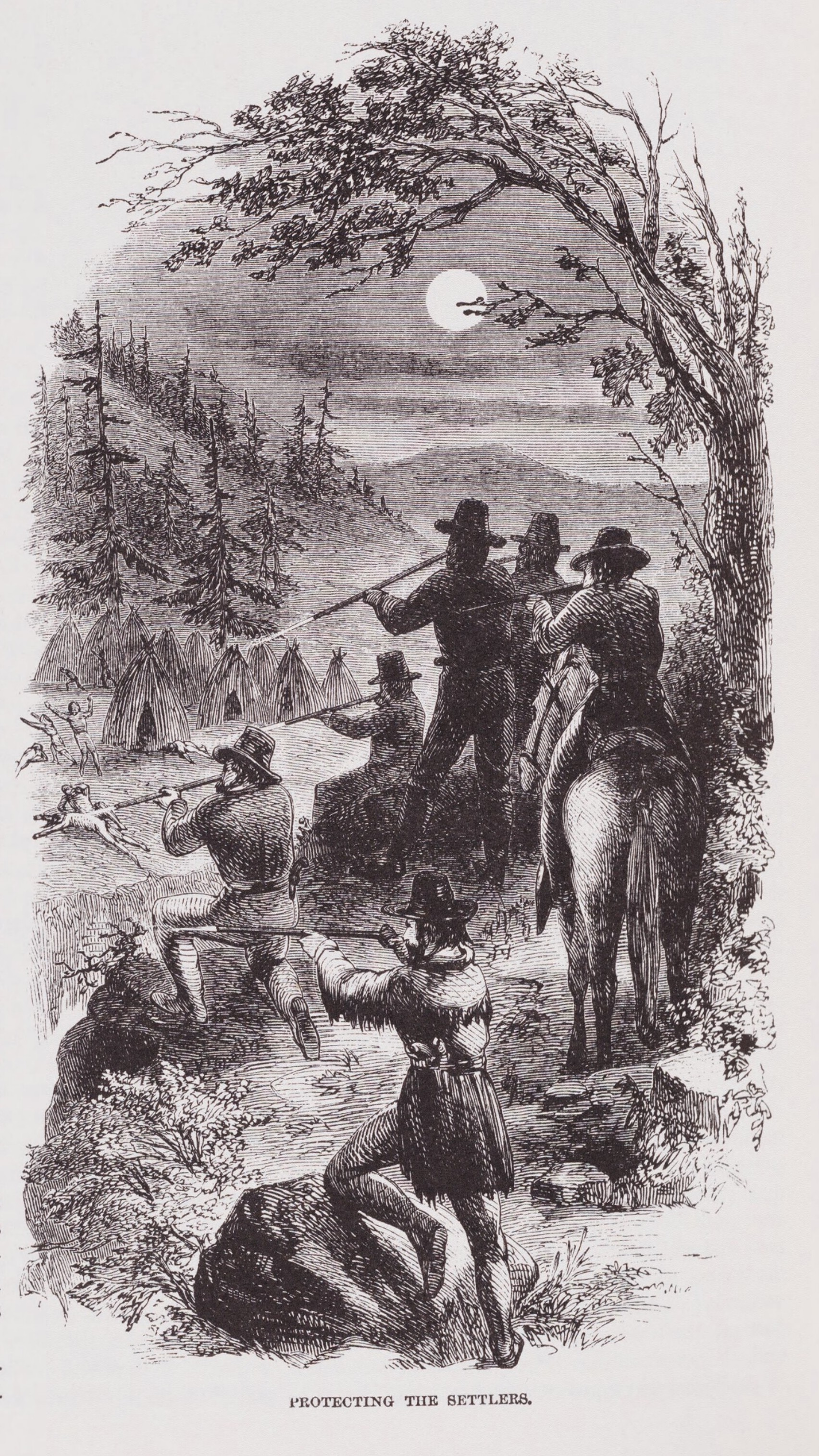
Protecting the Settlers, an illustration by J. R. Browne for his work The Indians of California (1864)

Urban indians had lived in California since Spanish times. The millrace where gold was first discovered had been dug by a crew of Indians hired by John Sutter.

The human and environmental costs of the Gold Rush were substantial. Native Americans, dependent on traditional hunting, gathering and agriculture, became the victims of starvation and disease, as gravel, silt and toxic chemicals from prospecting operations killed fish and destroyed habitats. The surge in the mining population also resulted in the disappearance of game and food gathering locales as gold camps and other settlements were built amidst them. Later farming spread to supply the settlers' camps, taking more land away from the Native Americans.

In some areas, systematic attacks against tribespeople in or near mining districts occurred. Various conflicts were fought between natives and settlers. Miners often saw Native Americans as impediments to their mining activities. Ed Allen, interpretive lead for Marshall Gold Discovery State Historic Park, reported that there were times when miners would kill up to 50 or more Natives in one day. Retribution attacks on solitary miners could result in larger scale attacks against Native populations, at times tribes or villages not involved in the original act. During the 1852 Bridge Gulch Massacre, a group of settlers attacked a band of Wintu Indians in response to the killing of a citizen named J. R. Anderson. After his killing, the sheriff led a group of men to track down the Indians, whom the men then attacked, killing more than 150 Wintu people. Only three children survived the massacre that was against a different band of Wintu than the one that had killed Anderson.

Historian Benjamin Madley in An American Genocide, recorded the numbers of killings of California Indians between 1846 and 1873 and estimated that during this period at least 9,400 to 16,000 California Indians were killed by non-Indians, mostly occurring in more than 370 massacres (defined as the "intentional killing of five or more disarmed combatants or largely unarmed noncombatants, including women, children, and prisoners, whether in the context of a battle or otherwise"). Furthermore, California stood in opposition to ratifying the eighteen treaties signed between tribal leaders and federal agents in 1851. The state government, in support of miner activities, funded and supported private militia groups, appropriating over $1 million towards the funding and operation of the paramilitary organizations. Peter Burnett, California's first governor, declared that California was a battleground between the races and that there were only two options towards California Indians: extermination or removal. "That a war of extermination will continue to be waged between the two races until the Indian race becomes extinct, must be expected. While we cannot anticipate the result with but painful regret, the inevitable destiny of the race is beyond the power and wisdom of man to avert." For Burnett, like many of his contemporaries, the genocide was part of God's plan, and it was necessary for Burnett's constituency to move forward in California. The Act for the Government and Protection of Indians, passed on April 22, 1850, by the California Legislature, allowed settlers to capture and use Native people as bonded workers, prohibited Native peoples' testimony against settlers, and allowed the adoption of Native children by settlers, often for labor purposes.

After the initial boom had ended, explicitly anti-foreign and racist attacks, laws, and confiscatory taxes sought to drive out foreigners—in addition to Native Americans—from the mines, especially the Chinese and Latin American immigrants mostly from Sonora, Mexico, and Chile. Spanish-speaking immigrants tended to group together and among these Chileans tended to assume leadership which made outsiders call all of them "Chilean". This leadership was particularly visible when Spanish-speaking miners had to confront "Anglo" miners. Chilean miners are known to have resisted eviction by various means, both legal and by the use of revenge attacks culminating in the Chile War of 1849.

The toll on the American immigrants was severe as well: one in twelve forty-niners perished, as the death and crime rates during the Gold Rush were extraordinarily high, and the resulting vigilantism also took its toll.

=== Worldwide economic stimulation ===
Chilean wheat exports to California from 1848 to 1854 (in qqm)
Year	Grains	Flour
1848	3000	n/a
1849	87,000	69,000
1850	277,000	221,000
1854	63,000	50,000

The gold rush stimulated economies around the world as well. Farmers in Chile, Australia, and Hawaii found a huge new market for their food; British manufactured goods were in high demand; clothing and even prefabricated houses arrived from China. The return of large amounts of California gold to pay for these goods raised prices and stimulated investment and the creation of jobs around the world. Australian prospector Edward Hargraves, noting similarities between the geography of California and his home country, returned to Australia to discover gold and spark the Australian gold rushes. Preceding the gold rush, the United States was on a bi-metallic standard, but the sudden increase in physical gold supply increased the relative value of physical silver and drove silver money from circulation. The increase in gold supply also created a monetary supply shock.

Within a few years after the end of the gold rush, in 1863, the groundbreaking ceremony for the western leg of the first transcontinental railroad was held in Sacramento. The line's completion, some six years later, financed in part with Gold Rush money, united California with the central and eastern United States. Travel that had taken weeks or even months could now be accomplished in days.

=== Gender practices ===
As the California gold rush brought a disproportionate population of men and set an environment of experimental lawlessness separate from the bounds of standard society, conventional American gender roles came into question. In the large absence of women, these migrant young men were made to reorganize their social and sexual practices, leading to cross-gender practices that most often took place as cross-dressing. Dance events were a notable social space for cross-dressing, where a piece of cloth (such as a handkerchief or sackcloth patch) would denote a 'woman.' Beyond social events, these subverted gender expectations continued into domestic duties as well. Though cross-dressing occurred most frequently with men as women, the reverse also applied.

These miners and merchants of various genders and gendered appearances, encouraged by the social fluidity and population limitations of the Wild West, shaped the beginnings of San Francisco's prominent queer history.

=== Longer-term ===
External videos
- Presentation by H. W. Brands on The Age of Gold: The California Gold Rush and the New American Dream, September 19, 2002, C-SPAN

California's name became indelibly connected with the gold rush, and fast success in a new world became known as the "California Dream". California was perceived as a place of new beginnings, where great wealth could reward hard work and good luck. Historian H. W. Brands noted that in the years after the Gold Rush, the California Dream spread across the nation:

The old American Dream ... was the dream of the Puritans, of Benjamin Franklin's "Poor Richard"... of men and women content to accumulate their modest fortunes a little at a time, year by year by year. The new dream was the dream of instant wealth, won in a twinkling by audacity and good luck. [This] golden dream ... became a prominent part of the American psyche only after Sutter's Mill.

Legacy
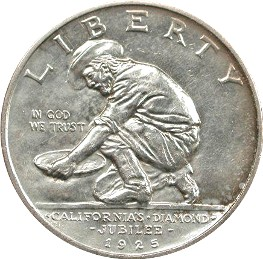
(1) State motto, "Eureka" on the Seal of California. (2) California state route shield, with the number 49 and shaped like a miner's spade. (3) The 1925 commemorative California Diamond Jubilee half dollar.

Overnight California gained the international reputation as the "golden state". Generations of immigrants have been attracted by the California Dream. California farmers, oil drillers, movie makers, airplane builders, computer and microchip makers, and "dot-com" entrepreneurs have each had their boom times in the decades after the gold rush.

In addition, the standard route shield of state highways in California is in the shape of a miner's spade to honor the California gold rush. Today, the aptly named State Route 49 travels through the Sierra Nevada foothills, connecting many Gold Rush-era towns such as Placerville, Auburn, Grass Valley, Nevada City, Coloma, Jackson, and Sonora. This state highway also passes very near Columbia State Historic Park, a protected area encompassing the historic business district of the town of Columbia; the park has preserved many gold rush–era buildings, which are presently occupied by tourist-oriented businesses.

== Cultural references ==
The literary history of the gold rush is reflected in the works of Mark Twain (The Celebrated Jumping Frog of Calaveras County), Bret Harte (A Millionaire of Rough-and-Ready), Joaquin Miller (Life Amongst the Modocs), and many others.

The San Francisco 49ers, a professional American football team based in the San Francisco Bay Area and competing in the National Football League, are named after miners.

== See also ==
- Barbary Coast
- California Mining and Mineral Museum
- Pike's Peak gold rush
- Doré bar
- Gold in California
- List of people associated with the California Gold Rush
