= Gold in California =

External videos
- Presentation by H.W. Brands on The Age of Gold, September 19, 2002, C-SPAN

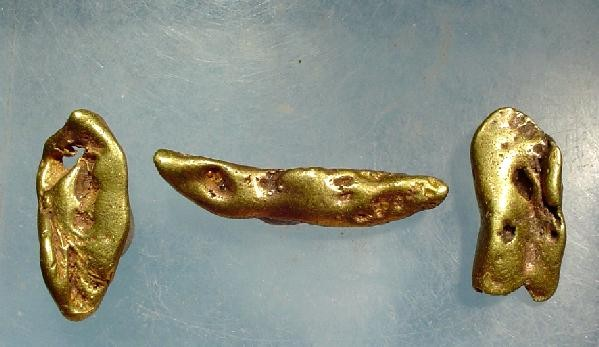
Three gold nuggets from Tuolumne County, California, similar to what the early miners would have found.

Gold became highly concentrated in California, United States as the result of global forces operating over hundreds of millions of years. Volcanoes, tectonic plates and erosion all combined to concentrate billions of dollars' worth of gold in the mountains of California. During the California Gold Rush, gold-seekers known as "Forty-Niners" retrieved this gold, at first using simple techniques, and then developing more sophisticated techniques, which spread around the world.

== Geology ==
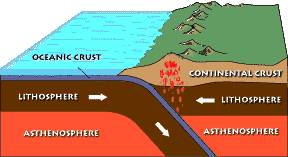
Gold-bearing magma rising after being subducted under the continental crust.

Geologic evidence indicates that over a span of at least 400 million years, gold that had been widely dispersed in the Earth's crust became more concentrated by geologic actions into the gold-bearing regions of California. Only gold that is concentrated can be economically recovered. Some 400 million years ago, rocks that would be accreted onto western North America to build California lay at the bottom of a large sea. Subsea volcanoes deposited lava and minerals (including gold) onto the sea floor; sometimes enough that islands were created. Between 400 million and 200 million years ago, geologic movement forced the sea floor and these volcanic islands and deposits eastwards, colliding with the North American Plate, which was moving westwards.

Beginning about 200 million years ago, tectonic pressure forced the sea floor beneath the American continental mass. As it sank, or subducted, beneath the western margin of the North American plate portions of the sea floor and overlying continental crust heated and melted, producing large molten masses (magma). Being lighter and hotter than the ancient continental crust above it, this magma forced its way upward, cooling as it rose to become the granite rock found throughout the Sierra Nevada and other mountains in California today. As the hot magma cooled, solidified, and came in contact with water, minerals with similar melting temperatures tended to concentrate together. As the magma solidified, gold became concentrated within hydrous silica solutions and was deposited within veins of quartz.

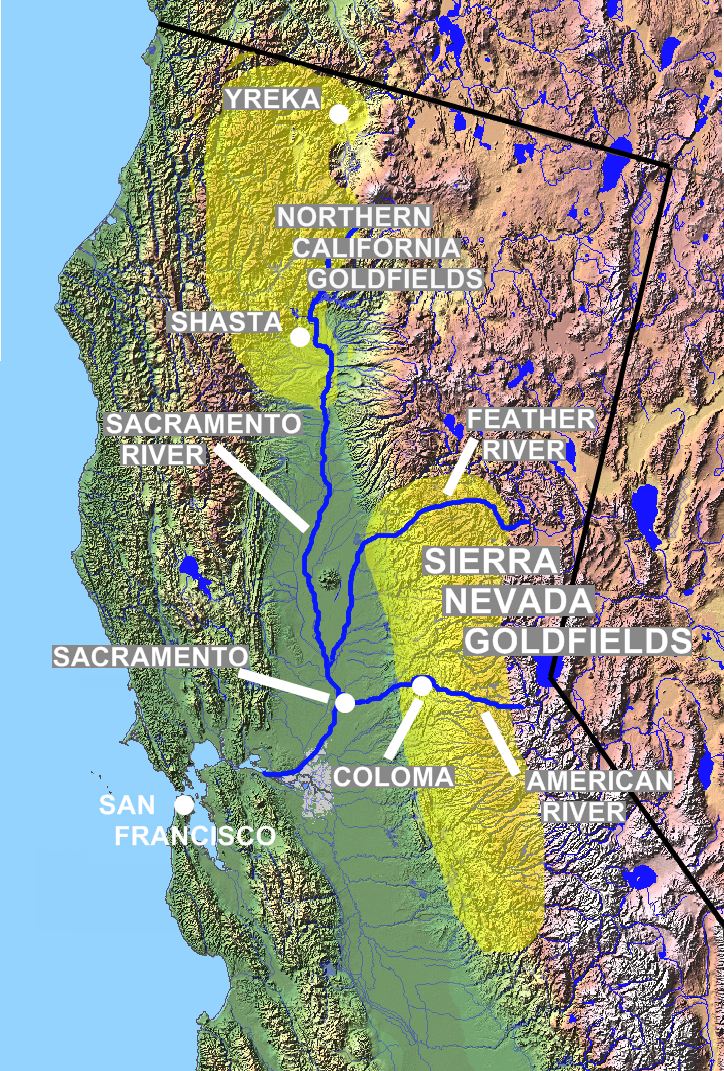
Goldfields in the mountains of northern and central California.

As the Sierra Nevada and other mountains in California were forced upwards by the actions of tectonic plates, the solidified minerals and rocks were raised to the surface and subjected to erosion. The surrounding rock then weathered and crumbled, and the exposed gold and other materials were carried downstream by water. Because gold is denser than almost all other minerals, this process further concentrated the gold as it sank, and pockets of gold gathered in quiet gravel beds along the sides of old rivers and streams.

The California mountains rose and shifted several times within the last fifty million years, and each time, old streambeds moved and were dried out, leaving the deposits of gold resting within the ancient gravel beds where the gold had been collecting. Newer rivers and streams then developed, and some of these cut through the old channels, carrying the gold into still larger concentrations.

The Forty-Niners of the California Gold Rush first focused their efforts on these deposits of gold, which had been gathered in the gravel beds by hundreds of millions of years of geologic action.

== Gold recovery ==
Because the gold in the California gravel beds was so richly concentrated, the early forty-niners simply panned for gold in California's rivers and streams, a form of placer mining. However, panning cannot take place on a large scale, and industrious miners and groups of miners graduated to placer mining "cradles" and "rockers" or "long-toms" to process larger volumes of gravel. Miners would also engage in "coyoteing". This method involved digging a shaft 6 to 13 meters (20 to 43 ft) deep into placer deposits along a stream. Tunnels were then dug in all directions to reach the richest veins of pay dirt. The largest single gold nugget found in California and in the United States is the Monumental Nugget discovered 1869.

In the most complex placer mining, groups of prospectors would divert the water from an entire river into a sluice alongside the river, and then dig for gold in the newly exposed river bottom. Modern estimates by the U.S. Geological Survey are that some 12 million ounces (370 t) of gold were removed in the first five years of the Gold Rush (worth over US$16 billion at December 2010 prices).

In the next stage, by 1853, hydraulic mining was used on ancient gold-bearing gravel beds on hillsides and bluffs in the goldfields. In a modern style of hydraulic mining first developed in California, a high-pressure hose directed a powerful stream or jet of water at gold-bearing gravel beds. The loosened gravel and gold would then pass over sluices, with the gold settling to the bottom where it was collected. By the mid-1880s, it is estimated that 11 million ounces (340 t) of gold (worth approximately US$15 billion at December 2010 prices) had been recovered by "hydraulicking". This style of hydraulic mining later spread around the world.

A byproduct of these extraction methods was that large amounts of gravel, silt, heavy metals, and other pollutants went into streams and rivers. As of 1999 many areas still bear the scars of hydraulic mining, since the resulting exposed earth and downstream gravel deposits do not support plant life.

After the Gold Rush had concluded, gold recovery operations continued. The final stage to recover loose gold was to prospect for gold that had slowly washed down into the flat river bottoms and sandbars of California's Central Valley and other gold-bearing areas of California (such as Scott Valley in Siskiyou County). By the late 1890s, dredging technology (also invented in California) had become economical, and it is estimated that more than 20 million ounces (620 t) were recovered by dredging (worth approximately US$28 billion at December 2010 prices).

Both during the Gold Rush and in the decades that followed, gold-seekers also engaged in "hard-rock" mining, that is, extracting the gold directly from the rock that contained it (typically quartz), usually by digging and blasting to follow and remove veins of the gold-bearing quartz. By 1851, quartz mining had become the major industry of Coloma. Once the gold-bearing rocks were brought to surface, the rocks were crushed and the gold separated, either using separation in water, using its density difference from quartz sand, or by washing the sand over copper plates coated with mercury (with which gold forms an amalgam). Loss of mercury in the amalgamation process was a source of environmental contamination. Eventually, hard-rock mining wound up becoming the single largest source of gold produced in the Gold Country. The total production of gold in California from then until now is estimated at 118 million ounces (3700 t).

== Geological after-effects ==
There were decades of minor earthquakes, more than at any other time in the historical record for Northern California, before the 1906 San Francisco earthquake. Previously interpreted as precursory activity to the 1906 earthquake, they have been found to have a strong seasonal pattern and due to large seasonal sediment loads in coastal bays that overlie faults as a result of mining of gold inland.
