= Boulder Creek (Lillooet River tributary) =

Coordinates: 50°40′01.1″N 123°27′36.3″W

Location
- Country: Canada
- Province: British Columbia
- District: Lillooet Land District

Physical characteristics
- Mouth
  - location: Lillooet River

Boulder Creek, originally Pebble Creek, is a stream in the southern Pacific Ranges of the Coast Mountains in British Columbia, Canada. It flows southwest into the Lillooet River approximately 95 km (59 mi) northwest of the village of Pemberton.

Boulder Creek was officially named Pebble Creek on September 6, 1951. This name remained official until June 22, 1979, when it was changed to Boulder Creek as the former name was understood to be a misnomer.

== Geology and hydrology ==
Boulder Creek is noted for a set of surface hot springs commonly known as the Pebble Creek Hot Springs and Keyhole Hot Springs and rarely Boulder Creek Hot Springs. They are related to volcanism of the Mount Meager massif which last erupted about 2,350 years ago. The hot springs issue from Mesozoic basement rocks near volcanic vents. Hot springs are also present at nearby Meager Creek.

Keyhole Hot Springs address: 42.5 km Upper Lillooet FSR. 1 hour West of Pemberton. The pools are made of local stone found en situ. Built by local & regional masons & other volunteers. The zone above the Hot Springs is a designated "Ungulate Area" for breeding & birthing of Mountain Sheep and Goats.

== See also ==
- List of hot springs
- Boulder Creek (disambiguation)
