= Wrights Creek =

Wrights Creek may refer to:

- Wrights Creek, New South Wales, a locality in the City of Hawkesbury, Sydney, New South Wales, Australia
- Wrights Creek, Queensland, a locality in the Cairns Region, Queensland, Australia

== See also ==
- Wright Creek (disambiguation)
