= Mercury contamination in California waterways =

Mercury contamination in California waterways poses a threat to both the environment and human health. This naturally occurring heavy metal may be released into the environment from natural geological sources, but most commonly occurs from anthropogenic mining operations. This metal poses a threat not only for its effects on organisms, but also for difficulty of removal from waterways and the trouble in efficiently detecting it. The roots of mercury poisoning in waterways began with the historic mining of gold within California's streambed and hillsides; since the California Gold Rush, mercury has been used for gold extraction for its ability as a catalyze with the precious metal. due to the process of extraction and washing, mercury used would either be burned away as a hazardous vapor, or washed away into waterflows, resulting in widespread contamination of river and lake sediments. Mercury continues to be released today through anthropogenic sources, though state and federal agencies work to manage and ban these practices and to mitigate its effect on the environmental and on people. Many water bodies in the state of California bear fish consumption advisories due to mercury content.

== Historical start of mercury pollution in California ==
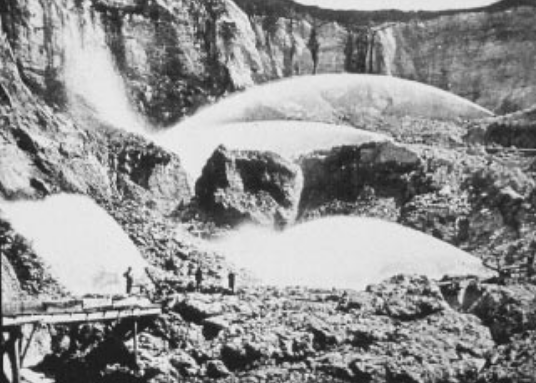
Monitors (water canons) in the placer mines used to break down sediment for gold exposure.

Historically the Gold rush represents the beginning of mercury pollution in California's waterways, as well as a plethora of water related issues. The California Gold Rush can be traced to James Marshall's January 24, 1848 discovery of gold on John Sutter's property. Marshall was a carpenter who helped construct the Sutter saw mill for Sutter, and the night before the iconic gold discovery Marshall diverted water from the American River through the lumber mill he was constructing tailrace to wash away loose gravel and dirt. The next morning (January 24, 1848) he discovered metallic flecks where the river water was flowing through the saw mill. He thought it was gold immediately, but didn't pursue it until the Sutter sawmill was completed.

By the time of the following spring Marshall's gold discovery, the largest Gold Rush in American history began. In this short year the non-Native American population raised from 14,000 to 100,000. The population increased again to 250,000 by the year of 1892.

While gold was initially easily extracted from the river soil and gravel by scooping and silling, the bottom trawler method was also developed to extract more gold at once. As the amount of miners and rate of mining increased, easily collected placer gold became scarcer, and new mining techniques were developed to extract gold more efficiently from rivers and the harder to reach lode gold. One of the main, and also most destructive methods was that of hydraulic mining. This involved the redirecting of water from the river into a narrow channel, into a large canvas hose, and iron nozzle. Then these water cannons, which were called monitors, would shoot a very high pressure stream that would break apart hillsides. The water, slurry, and debris, mostly gravel would flow over large sluices and drainage tunnels. One of the most useful tools for increasing gold collection was the use of mercury, which prompted the mass use and mining of mercury in response.

== Use of mercury in gold mining ==
Historically, mercury, also called "quicksilver," was used during the mining process of gold. During hydraulic mining, as the water, slurry, and debris flowed over the sluices and drainage tunnels, the particles were mixed with liquid mercury. The mercury was used to attract the gold and sometimes silver from the mining ore for extraction. The most common use of mercury for gold and silver extraction was a process called mercury amalgamation.

During this process, the miner mixes mercury with mining silt or ore and the mercury then sticks to the gold, thus separating from the ore and silt and forming one solid piece of mercury–gold amalgam. Additional separation from the silt and ore is done by washing away the ore with water until only the amalgam is left. The next step of the process involves separating the gold from the now useless mercury. To do so, miners heat up the mercury-gold amalgam to a high temperature to vaporize the mercury, leaving only the gold. The vaporization of mercury requires a temperature of at least 357 °C. In addition to the mercury-gold amalgam, some residue mercury is also still present in the silt and ore that was washed away, sometimes referred to as mine tailings. When these mine tailings are disposed of during the washing process, large amounts of the remaining mercury often pollutes and infiltrates the local ecosystems and especially waterways around and down steam from the mining sites. There was a loss of 10-30% of the mercury used during the extraction process, per season, which resulted in highly contaminated sediments at and down stream from mining sites. The highest mercury contamination levels are present and can be sourced back to the Placer area in California. Much of the mercury for mining was produced from deposits on the West side of California's central valley by the coast range, and it is estimated that 220,000,000 lb of mercury was procured from these deposits between 1850 and 1981.

== Primary sources of mercury ==
A large portion of currently known mercury contamination in California's waterways are the fault of not only unregulated mining methods of the gold rush, but also due to more modern mining practices of mining for mercury or gold. These sources of pollution are known as point sources (A localized and stationary pollution source), and often occur due to mercury being dispersed through mine tailings and wastewater during work, which infiltrates and brings mercury to water sources. While these point sources are the most visible of the pollutants, the mass majority of mercury contamination in waterbodies occurs through the deposition of gaseous mercury from the atmosphere. Mercury cycles around its environment naturally, and will cycle through periods of being vaporized and deposited back onto water or land from the atmosphere. Mercury may also be cycled more easily throughout the environment through the action of anaerobic sulfur-processing bacteria found in water. Mercury in its organic form will build up in biota (organisms like fish or plants) and through natural processes will eventually be contained within organisms which die and decompose, locking mercury into the sediment of waterbodies. Mercury naturally cycles itself in this manner, but the human release of vaporous mercury through gold and mercury industries has greatly increased the amount available in the environment, creating far more organic mercury pollution than is natural for our environment.

Mercury additionally may be released in large quantities into waterways through natural geothermal means. The sediment samples taken from Clear Lake was found to have a high amount of mercury concentration, which was believed to have come about from opening of geothermal fissures during seismic activity, which released a mass of stored mercury rich elements into the lake. A sample core study of the lakebed sediments determined the amount of mercury released into the water to be around 2,400 tons.

== Environmental impacts ==
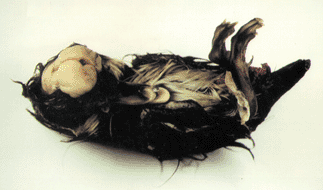
Mercury caused birth and developmental deformities in waterfowl.

Mercury caused birth and developmental deformities in waterfowl.

When mercury first enters into waterways and ecosystems, it is considered elemental inorganic mercury. While this heavy metal is highly toxic in its elemental form, it can become more-so through it being manipulated into a biologically accessible form known as methylmercury. While the full process of how the methylation process and trophic magnification function or vary in different circumstances is not fully understood, it is known that bacteria play a primary role in mercury's inclusion into the ecosystem by absorbing elemental mercury, methylating it into an organically accessible form, and either releasing the methylmercury into the environment where it is absorbed by plankton, or by being consumed by another organism that feeds on the bacteria. These bacteria are known as anaerobic bacteria species, which convert elemental mercury into methylmercury by methylating oxidized mercury to methylmercury.

This newly transformed form of mercury (methylmercury) then begins to bio-accumulate in the many species inhabiting the contaminated waterways and ecosystems. Many plants and autotrophic organism passively absorb Methylmercury throughout their life, and even under long-term exposure with methylmercury, their fitness is not significantly reduced. Autotrophs like animals on the other hand accumulate methylmercury in their body's faster as they consume other mercury-containing organisms, resulting in the process of each successive level in the food chain consuming higher levels of methylmercury (Biomagnification). The bio-accumulation levels of toxic methylmercury are found to be the highest by larger predator fish species, fish eating animals, and humans for whom fish is a prominent food source. Though methylmercury traces have also been found in reptiles, amphibians, invertebrates, flora, birds, and even the surrounding soil.

The environments that methylmercury levels are most commonly found in at high levels are wetlands, newly flooded reservoirs, aquatic areas close to mining sites or factories, bays, and waterways with low pH levels, as this is strongly correlated with rate of bacteria methylmercury production. mercury release sites from anthropomorphic and natural sources can pollute waterways for great distances should they be uphill of a watershed.

The many health effects of methylmercury has on wildlife include reproductive problems and reductions, enzyme and immune system problems, developmental issues, and genetic alterations. These problems have had the greatest effects on waterfowl because of their high fish diets. Some of the waterfowl experiencing the most problems with methylmercury are the Great Egret, Diving Duck, Herons, and Loons. Research and scientific surveys have shown a dramatic reduction in Loon chicks and a change in juvenile Great Egrets with a direct correlation with high levels of methylmercury. Ecosystems with both methylmercury and the element selenium can produce an even more toxic and potentially deadly mixture for wildlife.

== Human health impacts ==
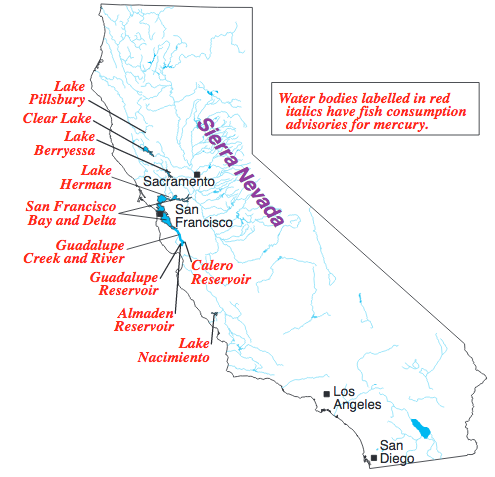
Areas in California with fish consumption advisories due to mercury contamination.

There have been many studies and negative health impacts, directly relating to mercury contamination in both food sources and the environment. One of the main sources of mercury contamination and over consumption is through fish, already contaminated with high levels of mercury. Mercury can impair, damage, and even destroy functioning nerve tissue-much like lead. The over consumption of methylmercury can also reduce immune system response, damage the nervous system, including coordination, sense of touch, taste, and sight.

One of the major health threats presented from the over consumption of these high mercury levels is the development of learning disabilities and developmental problems in children. This is the result of over mercury exposure after birth, and/or over consumption of high mercury levels of the mother during pregnancy. The high concern is because mercury can be passed between the pregnant mother through the placenta to the unborn fetus. The form that mercury that is being consumed is Methylmercury, which the federal government has classified as a neurotoxin, which is described as a poisonous substance that attacks the nervous system, and impairs the function of the nerve and nerve tissue. Even small amounts of this neurotoxin can cause brain and nervous system development problems. The effects of this utero (before birth in the uterus) transfer can also take between a number of months or even years before signs appear, making it difficult to trace back. The forms that methylmercury exposure will show itself is that the child will have shorter attention spans, poor fine motor skills, slow language development, visual-spatial abilities (like drawing), and memory. A mothers exposure and consumption of methylmercury prior to pregnancy can also be just as serious as exposure during pregnancy, because methylmercury is slowly excreted from the body, sometimes taking months to fully leave an individual's system. This can greatly effect the fetuses development, as many important developmental stages of the nervous systems and brain occur during the first two months of pregnancy. Health experts suspect that children are more susceptible to methylmercury than adults, because they eat more food relative to their total body weight causing a higher contamination percentage. It has been concluded that 60,000 children born each year are at risk for neuro-developmental effects, due to in utero exposure to methylmercury.

Another form of human exposure to elemental mercury is the inhalation of the vaporized form of the element directly from its source in the environment. This form of exposure is especially common in and around old mining sites. This form of exposure can cause gingivitis, tremors, damages to the gastrointestinal tract, less efficient enzyme productivity, and in rare cases kidney failure.

== Removal from water ==
There have been many studies on the purification and extraction of mercury from water sources and sometimes even the affected soils around the contaminated water sources. Some of these methods that are continuously being researched and sampled are the use of high-performance liquid chromatography (HPLC) combined with inductively-coupled plasma mass spectrometry (ICP-MS). Because the different forms of mercury have different forms of toxicity, this method allows for the removal of each form and a thorough study of the toxicity and potential harm of each separate form. This is because the typical concentration of methylmercury in water sources and Methylmercury is below detection rates, but it doesn't necessarily mean the continuous buildup in the consumers body's, or the environment will have any symptoms. The most common method of speciation for the removal, is gas chromatography or high-pressure liquid chromatography paired with fluorescence, natural elements, and photometry detectors. The downside of this form of detection is that it requires very large numbers of samples to test the concentration and toxicity levels. Other methods include the charging of ions to separate the toxic elements and toxins from the water for extraction. These methods are currently most common for use in China, for the removal of these toxic heavy metals for the use of drinking water. One theory that is being tested by the federal government to clean methylmercury out of waterways, is to find a bacterium that transforms methylmercury back into elemental mercury. With this process of transformation, the elemental mercury can vaporize and evaporate out of the waterways naturally.

== See also ==
- Mercury in fish
- Methylmercury
- Mercury poisoning
- Mercury (element)
- Mercury pollution in the ocean
