= Boulder Creek (British Columbia) =

Coordinates: 59°38′17″N 133°24′05″W

Boulder Creek is a creek located in the Atlin Country region of British Columbia.

The creek flows into Lake Surprise from the north side just west of Ruby Creek. Boulder Creek was discovered in 1898. The creek had rich mining content for one mile of its length. Of all Atlin Placer Creeks, Boulder ranks third in total gold production. Consolidated Mining and Smelting Company have worked the creek. The creek has been hydraulicked. The largest gold nugget recovered from the creek weighed just over 19 ounces and was found in 1899.
