= Wright Creek (British Columbia) =

Coordinates: 59.653°N 133.236°W

Wright Creek is a creek located in the Atlin Country region of British Columbia. The creek flows into the south side of Lake Surprise. It is located 2 miles to east of Otter Creek. The creek was mined for gold.

The largest nugget recovered from the creek weighed just over 25 ounces in 1899. The nugget was exhibited at the Paris Exposition in 1900. The creek has been mined using drifting, shovelling-in, sluicing, and hydraulicking.
