= Wright Creek (Missouri) =

Stream in the American state of Missouri

Wright Creek is a stream in St. Clair County in the U.S. state of Missouri. It is a tributary to the Osage River within the Truman Reservoir.

The stream headwaters arise north of Missouri Route Z about two miles north of Iconium (at 38°07′58″N 93°31′48″W). The stream flows to the west passing under Route Z twice. It continues west then turns north to flow past east of the old Valhalia site to enter the waters of the Truman Reservoir within the Valhalia State Wildlife Area and its original confluence with the Osage (at 38°09′56″N 93°34′23″W).

Wright Creek has the name of William P. Wright, a pioneer citizen. A variant name was "Buckeye Creek".

== See also ==
- List of rivers of Missouri
