= Boulder Creek Provincial Park =

Provincial park in British Columbia, Canada

- IUCN category II (national park)
- Location within British Columbia
- Interactive map of Boulder Creek Provincial Park
- Location: Cassiar Land District, British Columbia, Canada
- Nearest city: Smithers, BC
- Coordinates: 55°06′26″N 127°25′52″W
- Area: 53 ha (130 acres)
- Established: June 28, 1999
- Governing body: BC Parks

Boulder Creek Provincial Park is a provincial park in British Columbia, Canada, located to the west of BC Highway 16 near Smithers, in the Bulkley Valley.
