= Boulder Creek (South Dakota) =

Stream in South Dakota, United States of America

Coordinates: 44°23′02″N 103°35′55″W

Boulder Creek is a stream in the U.S. state of South Dakota.

Boulder Creek derives its name from a nearby canyon noted for the boulders it contains.

== See also ==
- List of rivers of South Dakota
