= Henry Raschen =

American painter (1854–1937)

- Born: October 2, 1856; Oldenburg, Grand Duchy of Oldenburg
- Died: August 24, 1937 (aged 80); Oakland, California, U.S.
- Education: San Francisco Art Association
- Occupation: Painter
- Children: 1 daughter

Henry Raschen (October 2, 1856 – August 24, 1937) was a German-born American painter. He did paintings of California landscapes and Native Americans.

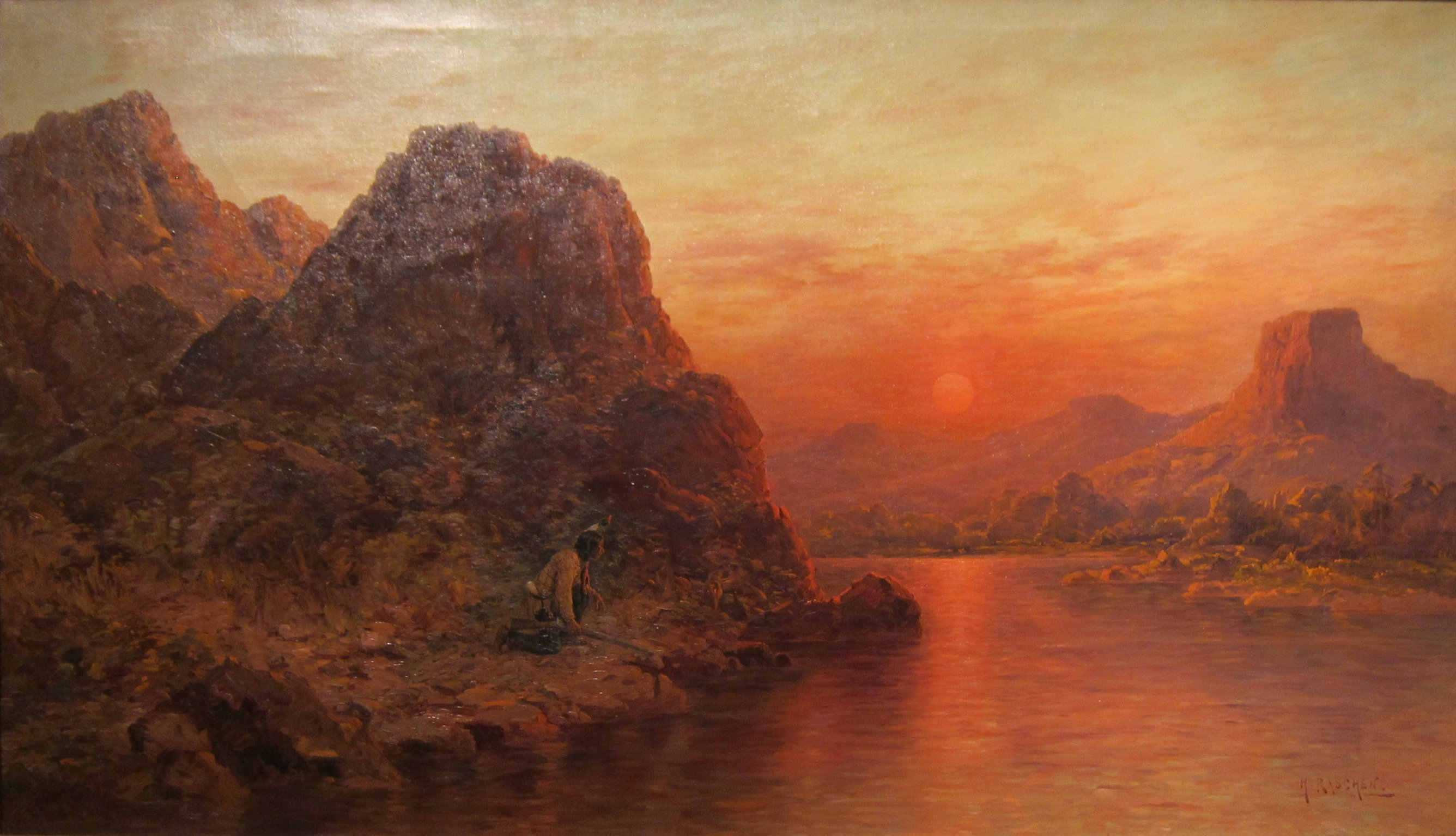
Indian Hunter at Sunset by Raschen, c. 1885.

== Early life ==
Raschen was born on October 2, 1856, in Germany. He emigrated to the United States with his family in 1868, and he grew up in Fort Ross, California.

Raschen attended the San Francisco Art Association, and he studied under Charles Christian Nahl in California. From 1875 to 1883, he studied in Germany.

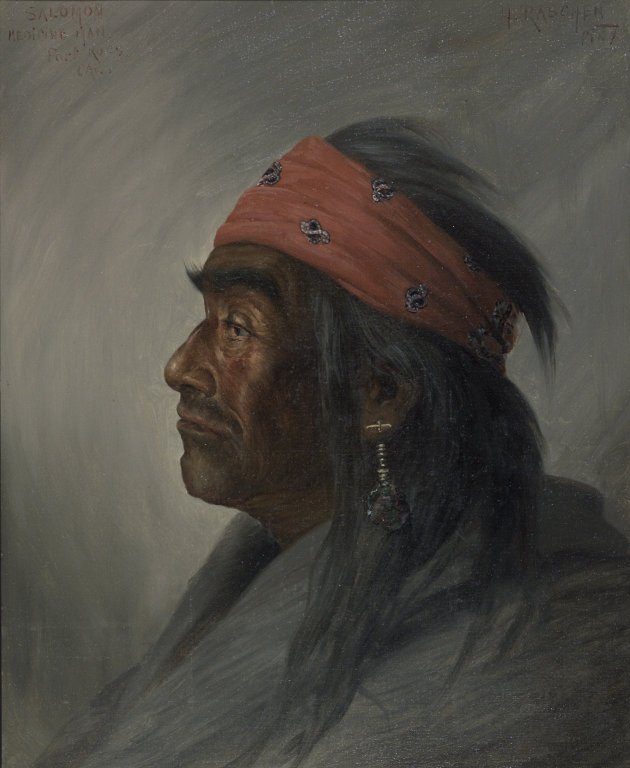
'Solomon, Medecine Man' by Rachen, c. 1894.

== Career ==
Raschen maintained a studio on Montgomery Street in San Francisco, where he painted Native Americans and California landscapes. Notable patrons included Richard T. Crane, King C. Gillette, E. H. Harriman, James Stillman, Isidor Straus, Charles Lee Tilden, and William Wrigley Jr. Another collector, Harry Flayderman, self-published a catalog of his work in 1958.

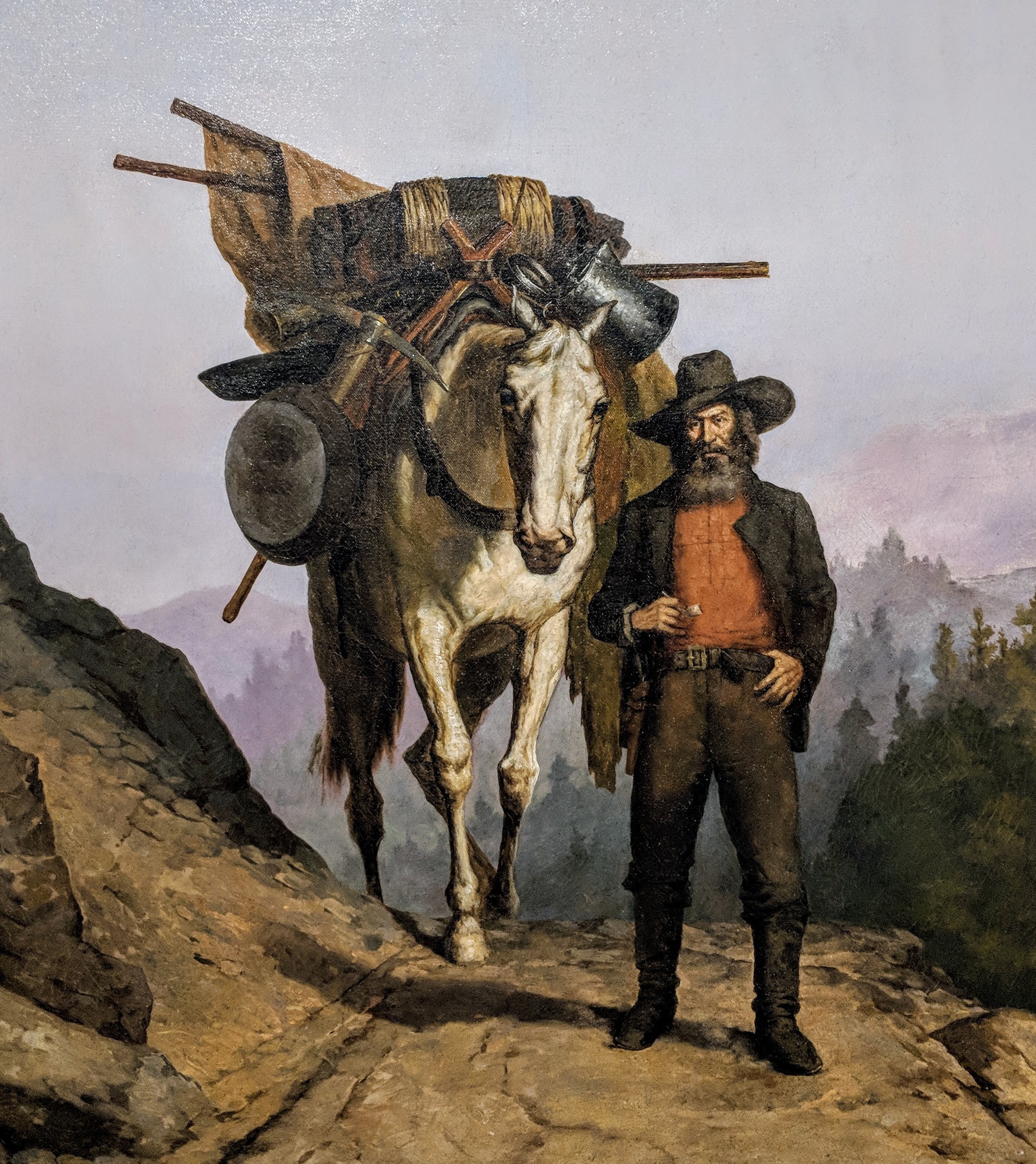
Detail of California Miner with Pack Horse, 1887, in the Oakland Museum of California

His artwork can be seen at the Brooklyn Museum in New York City, the Oakland Museum of California, the American Museum of Western Art – The Anschutz Collection in Denver, Colorado.

== Personal life and death ==
Raschen resided in San Francisco until 1906, when he moved to 1307 16th Avenue in Oakland, California. He had a daughter, Mary Coburn.

Raschen died on August 24, 1937, in Oakland, at age 82.
