= Ruby Creek (Lake Surprise) =

Creek in British Columbia, Canada

Coordinates: 59°39′10″N 133°19′54″W

Ruby Creek is a creek located in the Atlin Country region of British Columbia. This creek flows into the north side of Surprise Lake about 3 miles to the east of Boulder Creek. The creek has been mined and was discovered in 1898. The largest nugget recovered from the creek weighed just over 47 ounces on July 3, 1931.
