= Rocker box =

Gold mining implement

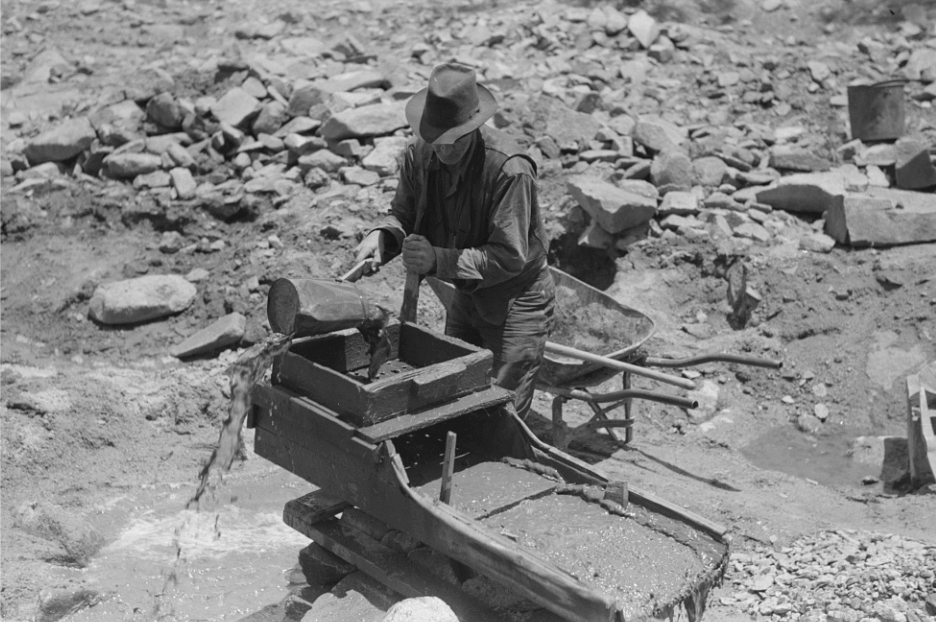
Gold prospector pouring water through his rocker box, Pinos Altos, New Mexico (1940).

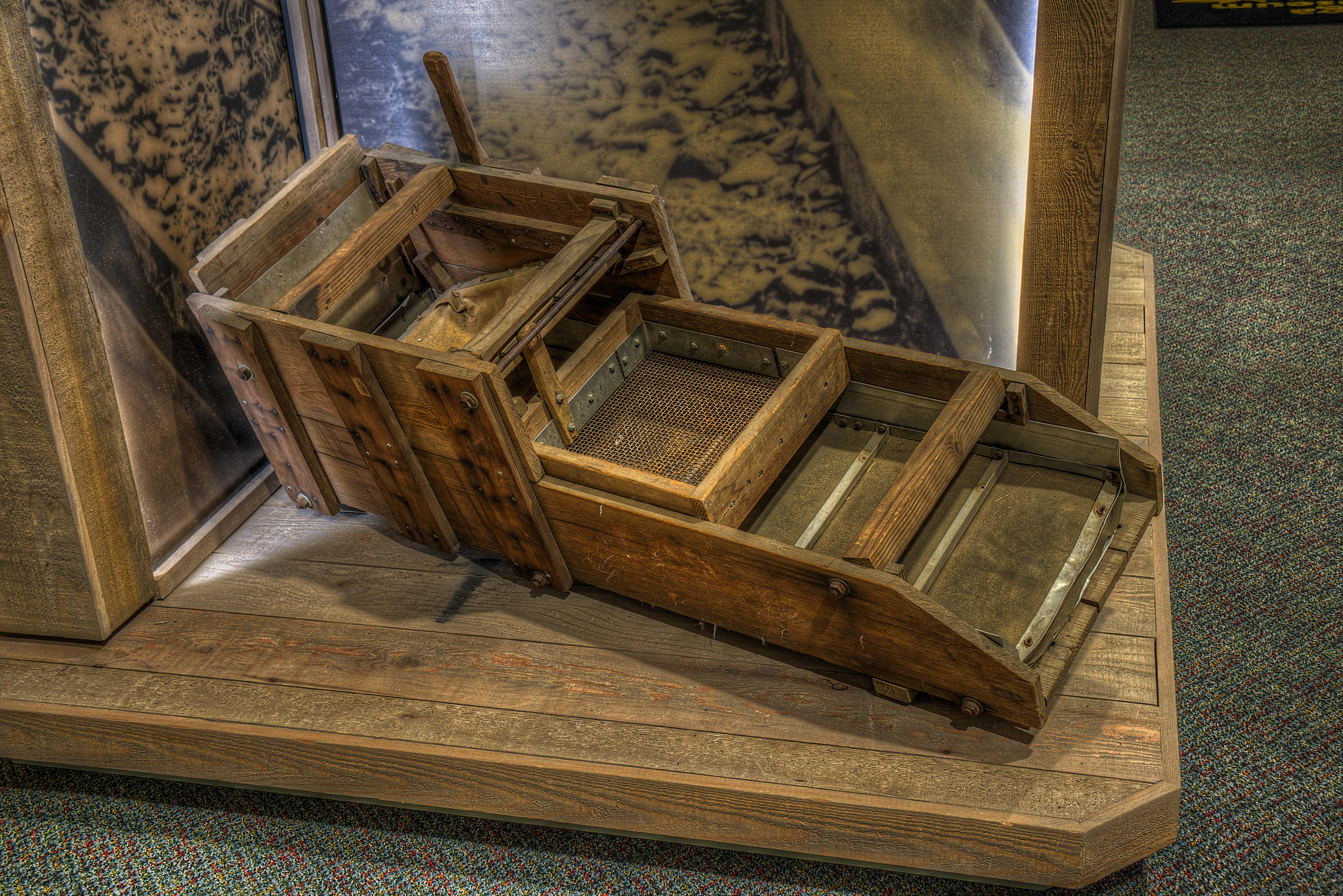
Rocker box exhibit at Dahlonega Gold Museum

A rocker box (also known as a cradle or a big box) is a gold mining implement for separating alluvial placer gold from sand and gravel which was used in placer mining in the 19th century. It consists of a high-sided box, which is open on one end and on top, and was placed on rockers.

== Design ==
The inside bottom of the box is lined with riffles and usually a carpet (called Miner's Moss) similar to a sluice box. On top of the box is a classifier sieve (usually with half-inch or quarter-inch openings) which screens-out larger pieces of rock and other material, allowing only finer sand and gravel through. Between the sieve and the lower sluice section is a baffle, which acts as another trap for fine gold and also ensures that the aggregate material being processed is evenly distributed before it enters the sluice section. It sits at an angle and points towards the closed back of the box. Traditionally, the baffle consisted of a flexible apron made of canvas or a similar material, which had a sag of about an inch and a half in the center, to act as a collection pocket for fine gold. Later rockers (including most modern ones) dispensed with the flexible apron and used a pair of solid wood or metal baffle boards. These are sometimes covered with carpet to trap fine gold. The entire device sits on rockers at a slight gradient, which allows it to be rocked side to side.

Rockers are usually homemade and display a variety of designs. A favorite design consists essentially of a combination washing box and screen, a canvas or carpet apron under the screen, a short sluice with two or more riffles, and rockers under the sluice. The bottom of the washing box consists of sheet metal with holes about a half an inch in diameter punched in it, or a half-inch mesh screen can be used. Dimensions shown are satisfactory, but variations are possible. The bottom of the rocker should be made of a single wide, smooth board, which will greatly facilitate cleanups. The materials for building a rocker cost only a few dollars, depending mainly on the source of lumber.

== Use ==
Today, the rocker box is not used as extensively as the sluice, but still is an effective method of recovering gold in areas where there is not enough available water to operate a sluice effectively. Like a sluice box, the rocker box has riffles and a carpet in it to trap gold. It was designed to be used in areas with less water than a sluice box. The mineral processing involves pouring water out of a small cup and then rocking the small sluice box like a cradle, thus the name rocker box or cradle.

Rocker boxes must be manipulated carefully, to prevent losing the gold. Although big, and difficult to move, the rocker can pick up twice the amount of the gravel, and therefore more gold in one day than an ordinary gold mining pan. The rocker, like the pan, is used extensively in small-scale placer work, in sampling, and for washing sluice concentrates and material cleaned by hand from bedrock in other placer operations. One to three cubic yards, bank measure, can be dug and washed in a rocker per man-shift, depending upon the distance the gravel or water has to be carried, the character of the gravel, and the size of the rocker.
