= Atlin District =

Historic region in British Columbia

The Atlin District, also known as the Atlin Country, is a historical region located in the far northwestern corner of the Canadian province of British Columbia, centered on Atlin Lake and the gold-rush capital of the region, the town of Atlin. The term "Atlin District" was also used synonymously with the official administrative area named the Atlin Mining District, established during the gold-mining heyday contemporaneous with the Klondike Gold Rush. The region also includes adjoining Teslin and Tagish lakes and the Bennett Lake area in the narrow strip of BC separating the Alaska Panhandle from the Yukon. The Atlin District is currently part of the Stikine Region in the regional district system (although it is not itself a regional district). The communities of the Atlin Lakes district, as the area is casually called, are referred to in national weather reports as "the Southern Lakes", as in "Whitehorse and the Southern Lakes", although this also includes towns on the Yukon end of the lakes.

== Atlin Mining District ==
The Atlin Mining District, also known as the Atlin District, was described as follows:

The Atlin District proper embraces the Atlin and Bennett Lake Mining Divisions; these take up the Eastern and Western halves of the District, respectively, and they extend from the Dalton Trail on the West to the watershed between Surprise and Glady Lakes on the East. The North boundary is the Sixtieth Parallel of Latitude; on the south is United States territory.

== See also ==
- Birch Creek
- Wright Creek
