= Bridge River Vent =

Volcanic crater in Canada

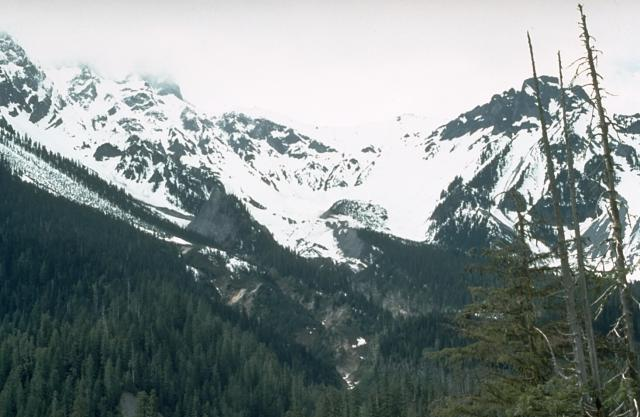
- A photo of the northern flank of the Mount Meager massif. The Bridge River Vent is the bowl-shaped depression in the middle of this image.

Highest point
- Elevation: 1,524 m (5,000 ft)
- Coordinates: 50°39′22.64″N 123°30′06.36″W

Geography
- Location within British Columbia
- Location: British Columbia, Canada
- Parent range: Pacific Ranges
- Topo map: NTS 92J12 Mount Dalgleish

Geology
- Mountain type: Volcanic crater
- Volcanic arc: Canadian Cascade Arc Garibaldi Volcanic Belt
- Last eruption: 410 BC ± 200 years

The Bridge River Vent is a volcanic crater in the Pacific Ranges of the Coast Mountains in southwestern British Columbia, Canada. It is located 51 km (32 mi) west of Bralorne on the northeastern flank of the Mount Meager massif. With an elevation of 1,524 m (5,000 ft), it lies on the steep northern face of Plinth Peak, a 2,677 m (8,783 ft) high volcanic peak comprising the northern portion of Meager. The vent rises above the western shoulder of the Pemberton Valley and represents the northernmost volcanic feature of the Mount Meager massif.

At least eight volcanic vents compose the Meager massif, with the Bridge River Vent being the most recent to form. It is the only vent of the massif to exhibit volcanic activity in the past 10,000 years and one of the several vents in the Garibaldi Volcanic Belt to erupt since the end of the last glacial period. The crater constitutes a bowl-shaped depression overlain by glacial ice and volcanic debris that were deposited during volcanic activity. Its breached northern rim has been a pathway for lava and ash flows that have traveled throughout the nearby Pemberton Valley.

== Eruptive history ==
=== Background ===
Volcanic activity of the Mount Meager massif is caused by subduction of the Juan de Fuca Plate under the North American Plate at the Cascadia subduction zone. This is a 1,094 km (680 mi) long fault zone running 80 km (50 mi) off the Pacific Northwest from Northern California to southwestern British Columbia. The plates move at a relative rate of over 10 mm (0.39 in) per year at an oblique angle to the subduction zone. Because of the very large fault area, the Cascadia subduction zone can produce large earthquakes of magnitude 7.0 or greater. The interface between the Juan de Fuca and North American plates remains locked for periods of roughly 500 years. During these periods, stress builds up on the interface between the plates and causes uplift of the North American margin. When the plate finally slips, the 500 years of stored energy are released in a massive earthquake.

=== Bridge River eruption ===
Bridge River eruption
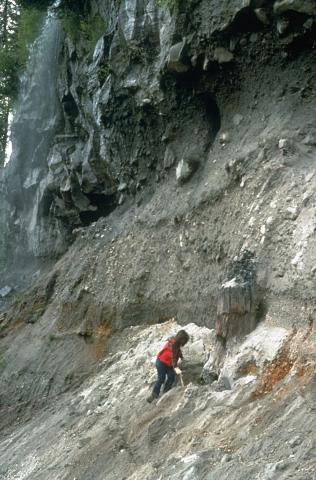
- A geologist next to a tree trunk that was buried by pyroclastic fall deposits from the Plinian phase of the eruption and then overrun by a pyroclastic flow.
- Volcano: Mount Meager massif
- Date: 410 BC ± 200 years
- Type: Plinian, Peléan
- Location: British Columbia, Canada
- VEI: 5

The Bridge River Vent was formed during an onset of eruptive activity about 2,350 years ago that ended a long period of dormancy at the Mount Meager massif. Substantially, the Bridge River event was explosive in nature, ranging from Plinian to Peléan activity. This is one of the most recent eruptions in the Garibaldi Volcanic Belt and the largest known explosive eruption in Canada in the past 10,000 years. It had similarities to the 1980 eruption of Mount St. Helens in the U.S. state of Washington and the continuous eruption of Soufrière Hills on the island of Montserrat in the Caribbean. The eruption, which was likely VEI-5 in nature, included a series of eruptive episodes that created a variety of volcanic deposits. They are exposed in cliff sections near the 209 km (130 mi) long Lillooet River and comprise the Pebble Creek Formation.

==== Plinian phase ====
At the start of the eruption, a large Plinian column rose above the Bridge River Vent, creating its bowl-shaped volcanic crater. This explosive eruption might have been followed by the collapse of a former lava dome based on the existence of a thick cover of welded vitrophyric breccia. The Plinian column is estimated to have had a height of 15 km (9.3 mi) to 17 km (11 mi). Its height has been calculated by comparing the size and density of rugged pumice fragments away from the vent area. However, the eruption column was likely higher than the estimated data indicates because it does not include the highest portions of the column. During this time of the eruption, tephra spread into the stratosphere and parts of the mushroom-shaped ash column collapsed, devastating nearby areas with heavy pyroclastic fall which deposited tephra on Meager's steep flanks. A pyroclastic fall deposit up to 80 m (260 ft) thick consists largely of light grey pumice grains that range in diameter from 1 cm (0.39 in) to 50 cm (20 in). About 1–5% of the pumice grains contain white to dark grey bands.

About 1–2% of the grains comprising the 80 m (260 ft) thick pyroclastic fall deposit were derived from the older Plinth Assemblage as the energetic Plinian column blasted the surrounding rock of Plinth Peak. These clasts are relatively minor to the abundant pumice grains. At least four other minor grain types make up less than 1% of the pyroclastic fall deposit. The most common is a somewhat inflated grey grain petrographically similar to the grey pumice grains. Ignimbrite forms a less common, but significant genetic grain. It includes level to extremely rounded pieces of white pumice that are normally 1 cm (0.39 in) to 10 cm (3.9 inches) in diameter and are enclosed by a red to pink, fine-grained, consistent matrix. Another grain, consisting of extremely rounded but glacially dissected quartz monzonite, is another small but widespread element of the pyroclastic fall deposit. The most infrequent of the four minor grain types is interpreted to be heated and burnt clay-rich soil. All four minor grain types are widespread in the pyroclastic fall deposit and are not restricted to any one portion or extent.

Strong high-altitude winds carried material east-northeasterly from the Plinian column to as far as Alberta, 530 km (330 mi) away from the vent to produce a large volcanic ash deposit. This widespread ash deposit, known as the Bridge River Ash, overlies older ash deposits from other large explosive eruptions in the Cascade Volcanic Arc, such as the 3,400-year-old Yn Ash from Mount St. Helens and the 6,800-year-old Mazama Ash from the catastrophic collapse of Mount Mazama. After this took place, a major pyroclastic flow deposited blocks of rounded pumice 5 cm (2.0 in) to 1 m (3.3 ft) in diameter on pyroclastic fall deposits of the collapsed Plinian column. The pyroclastic flow burnt and buried Meager's forested slopes in place. Remnants of this catastrophe are exposed south and east of the Bridge River Vent along the Lillooet River. At the vent area, the thickness of this pyroclastic flow ranges from 3 m (9.8 ft) to 10 m (33 ft).

==== Peléan phase ====
After the first major pyroclastic flow, a hot block and ash flow was erupted off the face of an advancing lava dome. This deposited 5 m (16 ft) of brittlely jointed welded breccia on top of the first major pyroclastic flow deposit. The slightly divided joints associated with the block and ash flow deposit range in a pattern from irregular to radial, indicating that the block and ash flow was rapidly quenched by water. These features might represent the first evidence of water reaction during the eruption and are mainly located near the 23 m (75 ft) high Keyhole Falls along the Lillooet River. The welded block and ash flow deposit is enclosed by a grey weathering glassy matrix.

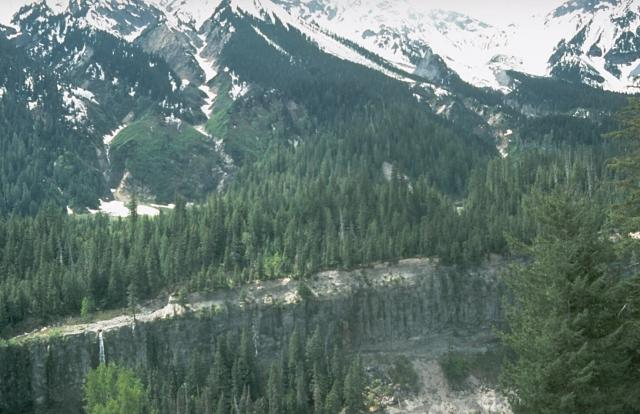
A pyroclastic flow deposit forming the foreground canyon wall on the Lillooet River. The Bridge River Vent is at the upper right corner.

The second and final major pyroclastic flow occurred when another pulse of gas-rich magma was erupted. This deposited 7 m (23 ft) of tephra on the earlier block and ash flow. In contrast to the first major pyroclastic flow, this pyroclastic flow was smaller and less energetic. Also, no burnt wood has been observed. Fine-grained volcanic ash, crystal and rock fragments comprise the matrix of the second major pyroclastic flow deposit.

A second hot welded block and ash flow erupted off the face of an advancing lava dome into the Lillooet River valley, forming a pyroclastic dam at least 100 m (330 ft) high. This block and ash flow deposited irregularly welded, monolithologic and vitrophyric breccia that ranges from 100 m (330 ft) thick at Keyhole Falls to 15 m (49 ft) thick between two creeks further downstream. About 50% of the breccia consists of thick black glassy angular blocks of porphyritic lava, some of which are flow banded. The breccia grains range in size from a few centimetres to about 1 m (3.3 ft) in length. Infrequent welded breccia grains in the thickest portion of the block and ash flow deposit adjacent to Keyhole Falls include grey spherulites and lithophysae.

The third and final block and ash flow deposited breccia more than 50 m (160 ft) thick. It was also erupted off the face of an advancing lava dome. In most locations the deposit is deeply eroded and forms recessively weathered slopes covered with vegetation.

==== Failure of volcanic dam ====
Damming of the Lillooet River from the second block and ash flow resulted in the creation of a lake just upstream. This lake continued to fill when the third block-and-ash flow was erupted, eventually reaching a maximum elevation of 810 m (2,660 ft) and a depth of at least 50 m (160 ft). As the lake continued to rise from inflow of the Lillooet River, the variably welded, poorly indurated pyroclastic dam failed catastrophically, releasing lake water down the Pemberton Valley to produce an outburst flood. Large volcanic blocks derived from the pyroclastic dam were carried downstream for 3.5 km (2.2 mi) where they were deposited in the water-saturated debris.

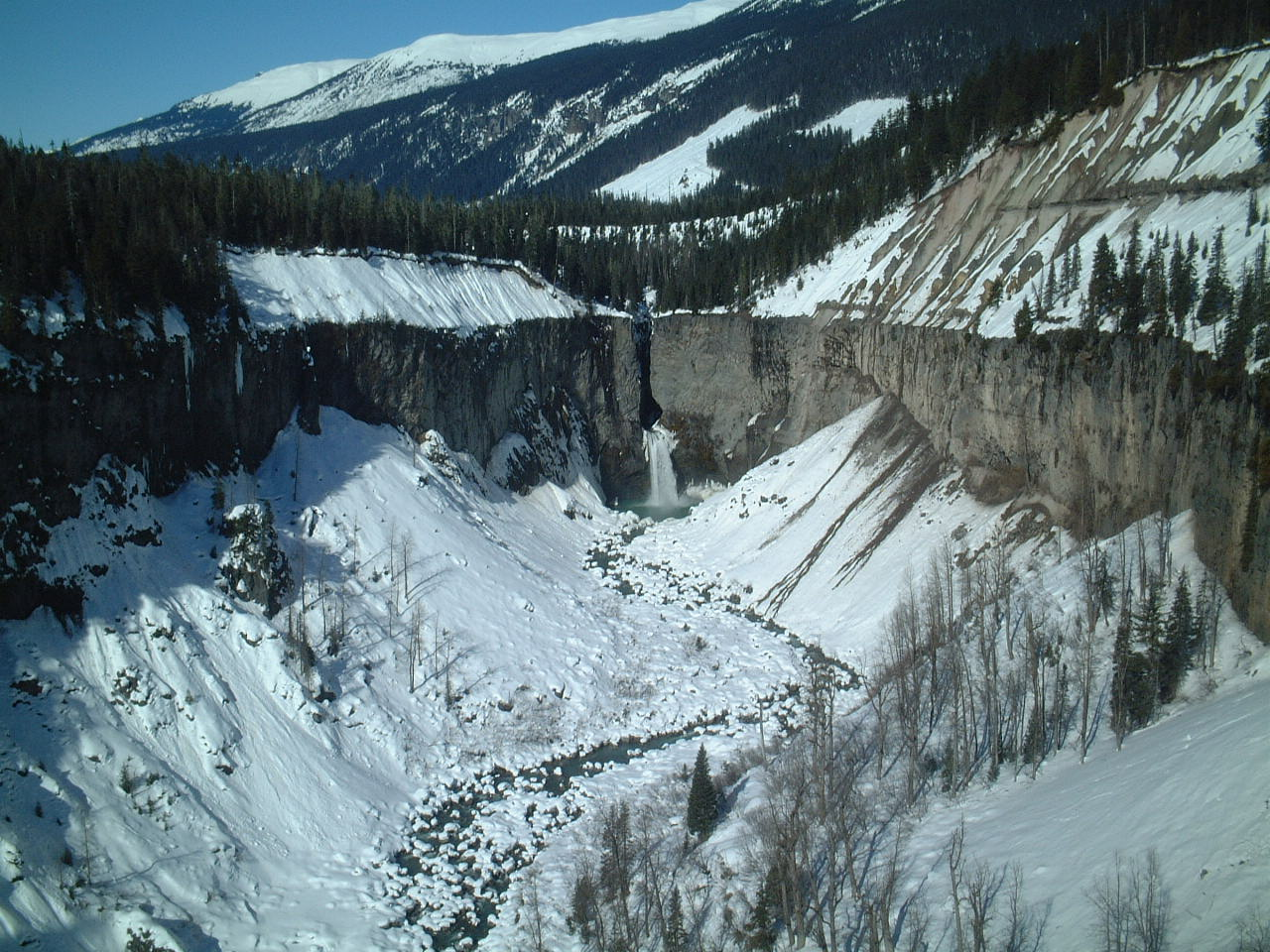
An image of Keyhole Falls. The foreground cliff consists of welded breccia that formed the competent portion of the pyroclastic dam but was eroded by the flood waters during the eruption about 2,350 years ago.

Additionally, the pyroclastic dam was still hot and poorly indurated when the flood waters rapidly cut through the pyroclastic material. Headward erosion of the dam created a 0.5 km (0.31 mi) wide and 2 km (1.2 mi) long canyon. The flood was significant enough to leave volcanic blocks 30 m (98 ft) above the pre-existing valley floor 5.5 km (3.4 mi) downstream of the dam failure. However, the flood was not long or large enough to complete headward erosion through the entire sequence of pyroclastic material. Subsequent erosion by the Lillooet River has created a 10 m (33 ft) wide and 30 m (98 ft) deep gorge in the competent portion of the pyroclastic dam from which Keyhole Falls cascades down.

==== Extrusion of lava flow ====
The final event of the eruption was the extrusion of a small thick glassy dacite lava flow. Although it has been heavily overgrown by vegetation, its original form is still well preserved. This lava flow was poor in volcanic gas, indicating that minor or no explosivity occurred when it was erupted. It is 2 km (1.2 mi) long and varies in thickness from 15 m (49 ft) to 20 m (66 ft). The southern margin of the lava flow cooled into well preserved columnar joints. Subsequent erosion of the lava flow by Fall Creek has created a waterfall.

=== Later eruptions ===
In 1977, J. A. Westgate of the University of Toronto suggested that a smaller eruption may have occurred at the Bridge River Vent after the eruption 2,350 years ago, sending tephra to the southeast. A tephra deposit overlying the Bridge River Ash at Otter Creek shows strong genetic relationships with the Bridge River Ash, differing only by its absence of biotite. In earlier publications, this tephra is classified as part of the Bridge River Ash. However, it has been dated to be about 2,000 radiocarbon years old, indicating that this tephra is a few hundred years younger than the Bridge River Ash. Apparent absence of biotite and occurrence well to the south of the Bridge River Ash likewise favour a separate identity.

== See also ==
- Capricorn Mountain
- Devastator Peak
- List of Cascade volcanoes
- List of volcanoes in Canada
- Mount Job
- Pylon Peak
- Volcanology of Western Canada
