= Monmouth Creek complex =

Volcanic complex in British Columbia, Canada

- Location within British Columbia

Highest point
- Elevation: 510 m (1,670 ft)
- Coordinates: 49°41′38″N 123°11′49″W

Geography
- Location: British Columbia, Canada
- District: New Westminster Land District
- Parent range: Pacific Ranges
- Topo map: NTS 92G11 Squamish

Geology
- Rock age: Unknown
- Volcanic arc: Cascade Volcanic Arc
- Volcanic belt: Garibaldi Volcanic Belt
- Volcanic field: Squamish volcanic field

The Monmouth Creek complex is a volcanic complex in southwestern British Columbia, Canada, located 4 km (2.5 mi) southwest of the community of Squamish on the west side of the Squamish River mouth. It lies in the southern Pacific Ranges of the Coast Mountains and is part of the Squamish volcanic field in the southern Garibaldi Volcanic Belt, which represents the northernmost extension of the Cascade Volcanic Arc.

Its prominent and enigmatic edifice is composed of basaltic andesite to dacite of unknown age and may represent a group of dikes and lava domes that formed subglacially. At least four dikes protrude its summit. These form the ribs of 60 m (200 ft) to 180 m (590 ft) high lava spines, the tallest being The Castle, which contains horizontal and radiating columnar joints. The spines are covered by welded breccia close to their bases and columnar jointing extends into the welded sequence. The most elevated lava flows and spines are composed of dacite.
