= Bridge River Ash =

Coordinates: 52.151°N 118.722°W

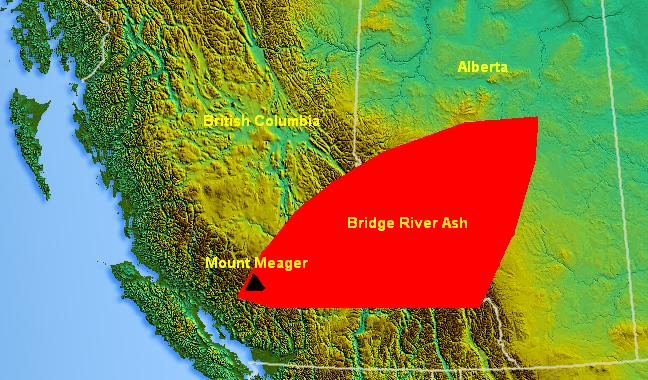
Map of the Bridge River Ash

The Bridge River Ash is a large geologically recent volcanic ash deposit that spans from southwestern British Columbia to central Alberta, Canada. The ash consists of dust-sized shards ellipsoidal fragments of pumice. It overlaps the Mount St. Helens Yn Ash and the Mazama Ash which were erupted from Mount St. Helens and Mount Mazama about 3,400 and 6,800 years ago.

Even though the name Bridge River Ash is consistent with the Bridge River Cones, the ash did not originate from these volcanoes. The Bridge River Ash was created by the Bridge River eruption of the Mount Meager massif about 2,350 years ago as prevailing winds carried the ash eastward during eruption. This is the most recent major eruption in Canada.

== See also ==
- Volcanism of Western Canada
