= Squamish volcanic field =

Volcanic field in Canada

- The extent of the Garibaldi Volcanic Belt showing the location of the Squamish field volcanoes.
- Country: Canada
- Province: British Columbia
- Region: Garibaldi Volcanic Belt
- Coordinates: 50°07′13″N 123°17′26″W
- Length: 3 km (1.9 mi)
- Width: 1 km (0.62 mi)

The Squamish volcanic field is a small north–south trending volcanic field on the South Coast of British Columbia, Canada. It extends for only about 3 km (1.9 mi) from the eastern side of Howe Sound northeast of Britannia Beach to the heavily forested slope on the western side of the Squamish River mouth. It forms the southernmost end of the Garibaldi Volcanic Belt, which comprises part of the Canadian Cascade Arc. Its volcanoes are relatively minor to the more voluminous stratovolcanoes found throughout the Garibaldi Belt and are composed of dacite and lesser basaltic andesite. The field gets its name from the nearby community of Squamish at the north end of Howe Sound on the Sea to Sky Highway.

Volcanism in the Squamish field has constructed at least two volcanic zones known as the Watts Point volcanic centre and Monmouth Creek complex. The most recent eruptive activity at these volcanoes is likely Pleistocene in age and are both likely products of glaciovolcanism during the last glacial period.

== See also ==
- Bridge River Cones
- Mount Cayley volcanic field
- List of volcanic fields
