= The Castle (volcano) =

Lava spine in British Columbia, Canada

- Location within British Columbia

Highest point
- Elevation: 510 m (1,670 ft)
- Prominence: 40 m (130 ft)
- Listing: Mountains of British Columbia
- Coordinates: 49°41′N 123°11′W

Geography
- Location: British Columbia, Canada
- District: New Westminster Land District
- Parent range: Pacific Ranges
- Topo map: NTS 92G11 Squamish

Geology
- Rock age: Pleistocene
- Mountain type: Lava spine
- Volcanic arc: Canadian Cascade Arc
- Volcanic belt: Garibaldi Volcanic Belt
- Last eruption: Pleistocene

The Castle is a lava spine located west of Squamish in southwestern British Columbia, Canada. Volcanism at The Castle is controlled by north–south structures and there are no hot springs known in the area. It forms part of the Monmouth Creek complex and is part of the Garibaldi Volcanic Belt which is a segment of the Cascade Volcanic Arc.

== See also ==
- Cascade Volcanoes
- Garibaldi Volcanic Belt
- Mount Garibaldi
- List of volcanoes in Canada
- Volcanism of Canada
- Volcanism of Western Canada
