= List of Cascade volcanoes =

This is a list of Cascade volcanoes, i.e. volcanoes formed as a result of subduction along the Cascadia subduction zone in the Pacific Northwest of North America. The volcanoes are listed from north to south, by province or state: British Columbia, Washington, Oregon, and California.

== British Columbia ==
Name	Type	Elevation (m)	Elevation (ft)	Last eruption date	Last eruption VEI	Location
Silverthrone Caldera (Note: The relationship of the Silverthrone complex with other volcanoes in the Cascade Volcanic Arc is not clear and remains uncertain. However, it is still considered to be a member of the Garibaldi Volcanic Belt, the Canadian portion of the Cascade Volcanic Arc formed by subduction of the Juan de Fuca Plate.)	Caldera	2,865	9,400	Unknown		51.43°N 126.30°W
Franklin Glacier Complex (Note: Like Silverthrone, the relationship of the Franklin Glacier Complex with other volcanoes in the Cascade Volcanic Arc is not clear and remains uncertain. But it is still considered to be a member of the Garibaldi Volcanic Belt, the Canadian portion of the Cascade Volcanic Arc formed by subduction of the Juan de Fuca Plate.)	Caldera	2,252	7,388	Pleistocene		51.33°N 125.04°W
Bridge River Cones	Volcanic field	2,500	8,500	Unknown		50.80°N 123.40°W
Mount Meager massif	Complex volcano	2,645	8,678	2,350 BP	5	50.63°N 123.50°W
Ring Mountain	Tuya	2,192	7,192	Unknown		50.22°N 123.30°W
Mount Cayley	Stratovolcano	2,385	7,825	Pleistocene		50.12°N 123.28°W
Mount Fee	Volcanic plug	2,162	7,093	Pleistocene		50.08°N 123.24°W
Mount Brew	Subglacial volcano	1,757	5,764	Pleistocene		50.04°N 123.19°W
The Black Tusk	Stratovolcano	2,319	7,608	Pleistocene		49.97°N 123.04°W
Cinder Cone	Cinder cone	1,910	6,266	Holocene		49.97°N 123.01°W
Clinker Peak	Stratovolcano	1,992	6,535	9,000 BP		49.93°N 123.04°W
Mount Price	Stratovolcano	2,052	6,732	9,000 BP		49.92°N 123.03°W
Garibaldi Lake	Volcanic field	2,316	7,598	Unknown		49.92°N 123.03°W
The Table	Tuya	2,021	6,631	Pleistocene		49.90°N 123.01°W
Mount Garibaldi	Stratovolcano	2,678	8,786	10,700-9,300	3?	49.84°N 123.00°W
Opal Cone	Cinder cone	1,736	5,696	9,300 BP		49.83°N 123.97°W
The Castle	Subglacial volcano	-	-	Pleistocene		49.69°N 123.02°W
Coquihalla Mountain	Stratovolcano	2,157	7,077	Miocene		-
Watts Point	Subglacial volcano	240	800	90,000 BP		49.39°N 123.13°W

== Washington ==
Name	Type	Elevation (m)	Elevation (ft)	Last eruption date	Last eruption VEI	Location
Mount Baker	Stratovolcano	3,286	10,781	1880	2	48.777°N 121.813°W
Sherman Crater	Volcanic crater	2,885	9,465	1880	2	48.46°N 121.48°W
Black Buttes	Stratovolcano	2,891	9,485	288,000 years ago		48.46°N 121.50°W
Schriebers Meadow Cone	Cinder cone	1,110	3,640	9,800 BP		48.699°N 121.817°W
Glacier Peak	Stratovolcano	3,213	10,541	1700 ± 100 years	2	48.112°N 121.113°W
White Chuck Cinder Cone	Cinder cone	1,835	6,020	Holocene-Pleistocene (2,000-17,000 years ago)		48.053°N 121.167°W
Dishpan Gap	Cinder cone	1,707	5,600	Unknown		47.977°N 121.149°W
Mount Rainier	Stratovolcano	4,392	14,411	1894	1?	46.853°N 121.760°W
Little Tahoma Peak	Stratovolcanic remnant	3,395	11,138	Less than 500,000 years ago		46.50°N 121.42°W
Mount Aix	Stratovolcano, caldera, complex volcano	2,367	7,766			46.47°N 121.15°W
Goat Rocks	Stratovolcano	2,494	8,184	500,000 BP		46.29°N 121.24°W
Mount Adams	Stratovolcano	3,742	12,277	950	2	46.206°N 121.490°W
Mount St. Helens	Stratovolcano	2,549	8,363	2008	2	46.20°N 122.18°W
Indian Heaven	Shield volcano	1,806	5,925	6250 BP ± 100 years		45.93°N 121.82°W
Sawtooth Mountain	Shield volcano	1,632	5,354	Pleistocene		46.07°N 121.771°W
Tumtum Mountain	Lava dome	611	2,004	70,000 BP		45.93°N 122.34°W
West Crater	Lava dome	1,329	4,360	7767 BP	2?	45.88°N 122.08°W
Trout Creek Hill	Shield volcano	893	2,930	340,000 BP		45.83°N 122.00°W
Silver Star Mountain	Shield volcano?, uplifited volcano	1,330	4,364	Miocene		45.75°N 122.24°W

== Oregon ==
Name	Type	Elevation (m)	Elevation (ft)	Last eruption date	Last eruption VEI	Location
Boring Lava Field	Volcanic field	1,236	4,055	Pleistocene		45.66°N 122.68°W
Rocky Butte	Cinder cone	174	571	Pleistocene		45.547°N 122.565°W
Powell Butte	Cinder cone	191	627	Pleistocene		45.487°N 122.504°W
Mount Sylvania	Cinder cone	292	958	Pleistocene		45.438°N 122.721°W
Mount Hood	Stratovolcano	3,426	11,240	1866 (major), 1907 (minor)	2	45.374°N 121.695°W
Olallie Butte	Shield volcano	2,199	7,215	Pleistocene		44.820°N 121.764°W
Mount Jefferson	Stratovolcano	3,199	10,495	950 AD?		44.674°N 121.799°W
Three Fingered Jack	Shield volcano	2,390	7,841	Pleistocene		44.478°N 121.845°W
Hogg Rock	Tuya	1,548	5,080	Pleistocene		44.422°N 121.877°W
Blue Lake Crater	Maar	1,230+	4,035	680 AD ± 200 years		44.411°N 121.774°W
Hoodoo Butte	Cinder cone	1,738	5,702	Holocene		44.402°N 121.884°W
Sand Mountain Field	Cinder cones	1,664	5,459	70 AD ± 150 years		44.38°N 121.93°W
Hayrick Butte	Tuya	1,683	5,523	Pleistocene		44.399°N 121.871°W
Castle Rocks	Stratovolcano	1,246	4,088	Meiocene		44°38′14″N 121°34′31″W
Black Butte	Stratovolcano	1,937	6,355	1,430,000 years ago (Pleistocene)		44.399°N 121.634°W
Mount Washington	Shield volcano	2,376	7,795	1,330 BP (flank eruption), 250,000 years ago (main)		44.332°N 121.838°W
Belknap Crater	Shield volcanoes	2,095	6,873	480 AD?	2?	44.285°N 121.843°W
Black Crater	Shield volcano	2,210	7,251	-		44.266°N 121.748°W
Three Sisters	Complex volcano	3,157	10,358	1,600 BP		44.10°N 121.77°W
Broken Top	Stratovolcano	2,797	9,055	100,000 BP		44.083°N 121.699°W
Pilot Butte	Cinder cone, lava dome	1,261	4,138	Pleistocene		44.061°N 121.283°W
Tumalo Mountain	Shield volcano	2,370	7,775	Pleistocene		44.005°N 121.642°W
Mount Bachelor	Stratovolcano	2,764	9,068	5800 BC		43.979°N 121.688°W
Lava Butte	Cinder cone	1,529	5,016	7,000 BP		43.918°N 121.356°W
Newberry Volcano	Shield volcano	2,435	7,989	690 AD	4	43.722°N 121.229°W
Maiden Peak	Shield volcano	2,383	7,818	-		43.626°N 121.925°W
Davis Lake	Volcanic field	2,163	7,096	2,790 BC?		43.57°N 121.82°W
Diamond Peak	Shield volcano, stratovolcano	2,665	8,744	Less than 100,000 BP (most likely 11,000 years ago)		43.520°N 122.149°W
Devils Garden	Volcanic field	1,698+	5,571	Unknown		43.512°N 120.861°W
Squaw Ridge	Volcanic field	1,711	5,613	Unknown		43.472°N 120.754°W
Four Craters	Volcanic field	1,501	4,924	Unknown		43.361°N 120.669°W
Cinnamon Butte	Cinder cones	1,956	6,417	Unknown		43.241°N 122.108°W
Howlock Mountain	Shield volcano	2,545	8,351	Pleistocene		43.192°N 122.039°W
Mount Bailey	Shield volcano	2,551	8,368	Less than 100,000 BP		43.155°N 122.221°W
Mount Thielsen	Shield volcano	2,799	9,184	Pleistocene		43.153°N 122.067°W
Yamsay Mountain	Shield volcano	2,498	8,196	Pleistocene		42.931°N 121.364°W
Mount Mazama	Stratovolcano, Shield volcano, Caldera, lava domes	2,487	8,159	2250 BC ± 300 years		42.93°N 122.12°W
Mount Scott	Stratovolcano	2,722	8,929	Pleistocene (400,000 years ago)		42.923°N 122.018°W
Hillman Peak	Stratovolcano	2,484	8,157	Pleistocene		42.57°N 122.10°W
Union Peak	Shield volcano	2,350	7,709	Pleistocene		42.831°N 122.224°W
Pelican Butte	Shield volcano	2,450	8,037	300,000 BP		42.513°N 122.146°W
Mount McLoughlin	Stratovolcano with a cinder cone and underlay by a shield volcano	2,894	9,495	20,000 BP		42.445°N 122.315°W
Brown Mountain	Shield volcano with a cinder cone	2,238+	7,344+	12,000 years ago (main), 2,000 years ago (flank)		42.21°N 122.16°W
Aspen Butte	Shield volcano	2,502	8,208	Less than 3.5 ma		42.315°N 122.088°W

== California ==
Name	Type	Elevation (m)	Elevation (ft)	Last eruption date	Last eruption VEI	Location
Medicine Lake Volcano	Shield volcano	2,412	7,913	1260 ± 40 years	3?	41.363°N 121.33°W
Rainbow Mountain	Stratovolcano	2,322	7,619	Pleistocene		41.474°N 121.956°W
Mount Shasta	Stratovolcano	4,317	14,163	1250 ±	3	41.409°N 122.193°W
Shastina	Stratovolcano	3,758	12,330	7420 BC		41.40°N 122.22°W
Black Butte	Lava dome	1,902	6,242	9,000-10,000 BP		41.363°N 122.348°W
Brushy Butte	Shield volcano	1,174	3,852	Unknown		41.178°N 121.443°W
Burney Mountain	Lava dome complex, stratovolcano	2,397	7,864	230,000 years ago		40.48°N 121.37°W
Magee Peak	Stratovolcano	2,647	8,684	1 million years ago		40.41°N 121.37°W
Big Cave	Shield volcano	1,259	4,131	Unknown		40.955°N 121.365°W
Twin Buttes	Cinder cones	1,631	5,351	Unknown		40.777°N 121.591°W
Tumble Buttes	Cinder cones	2,191	7,188	Unknown		40.68°N 121.55°W
Eagle Lake Field	Fissure vents	1,652	5,420	Unknown		40.63°N 120.83°W
Cinder Cone	Cinder cone	2,105	6,907	350 BP		40.53°N 121.32°W
Chaos Crags	Lava domes	2,592	8,503	1,000 BP		40.53°N 121.52°W
Lassen Peak	Lava dome	3,189	10,462	1921	3	40.492°N 121.508°W
Mount Tehama	Stratovolcano	2,815	9,235	600,000 BP		40.43°N 121.55°W

== See also ==
- List of volcanoes in the United States
- List of volcanoes in Canada
- Volcanology of Canada
- Volcanology of Western Canada
- List of Northern Cordilleran volcanoes
- Lists of volcanoes
