= Sham Hill =

Mountain in British Columbia, Canada

Highest point
- Elevation: 1,900 m (6,200 ft)
- Coordinates: 50.90°N 123.51°W

Geography
- Location: British Columbia, Canada
- Parent range: Pacific Ranges

Geology
- Rock age: 1,000,000 years
- Mountain type: Volcanic plug
- Volcanic arc: Canadian Cascade Arc
- Volcanic belt: Garibaldi Volcanic Belt
- Volcanic field: Bridge River Cones

Sham Hill is a volcanic plug in the Pacific Ranges of the Coast Mountains in southwestern British Columbia, Canada, located near the upper Bridge River. It is part of a volcanic group called the Bridge River Cones which in turn is part of the Garibaldi Volcanic Belt of the Canadian Cascade Arc.

== See also ==
- Volcanism of Canada
- List of volcanoes in Canada
- List of Cascade volcanoes
