= Garibaldi Volcanic Belt =

Volcanic chain in southwestern British Columbia, Canada

- Volcanic area
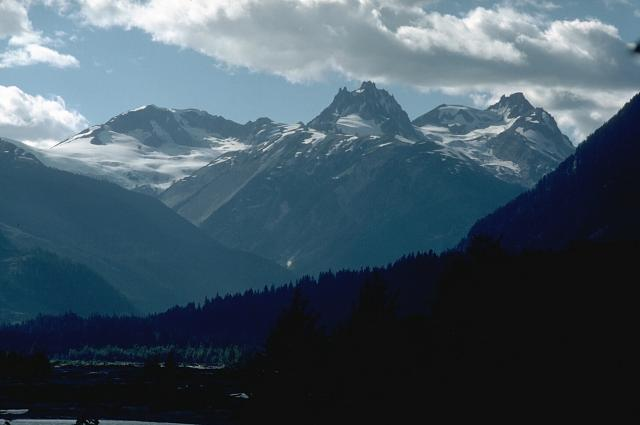
- The Mount Meager massif in 1987. Summits left to right are Capricorn Mountain, Mount Meager and Plinth Peak.

- The location and extent of the Garibaldi Volcanic Belt, showing its isolated volcanoes and related volcanic features.
- Location: British Columbia, Canada
- Geology: Lava flows; lava domes; cinder cones; stratovolcanoes; subglacial volcanoes; volcanic plugs; calderas

The Garibaldi Volcanic Belt is a northwest–southeast trending volcanic chain in the Pacific Ranges of the Coast Mountains that extends from Watts Point in the south to the Ha-Iltzuk Icefield in the north. This chain of volcanoes is located in southwestern British Columbia, Canada. It forms the northernmost segment of the Cascade Volcanic Arc, which includes Mount St. Helens and Mount Baker. Most volcanoes of the Garibaldi chain are dormant stratovolcanoes and subglacial volcanoes that have been eroded by glacial ice. Less common volcanic landforms include cinder cones, volcanic plugs, lava domes and calderas. These diverse formations were created by different styles of volcanic activity, including Peléan and Plinian eruptions.

Eruptions along the length of the chain have created at least three major volcanic zones. The first began in the Powder Mountain Icefield 4.0 million years ago. Mount Cayley began its formation during this period. Multiple eruptions from 2.2 million to 2,350 years ago created the Mount Meager massif, and eruptions 1.3 million to 9,300 years ago formed Mount Garibaldi and other volcanoes in the Garibaldi Lake area. These major volcanic zones lie in three echelon segments, referred to as the northern, central, and southern segments. Each segment contains one of the three major volcanic zones. Apart from these large volcanic zones, two large poorly studied volcanic complexes lie at the northern end of the Pacific Ranges, namely Silverthrone Caldera and Franklin Glacier Complex. They are considered to be part of the Garibaldi Volcanic Belt, but their tectonic relationships to other volcanoes in the Garibaldi chain are unclear because of minimal studies.

== Geology ==
=== Background ===
Prior to Garibaldi Belt formation, a number of older, but related volcanic belts were constructed along the Southern Coast of British Columbia. This includes the east–west trending Alert Bay Volcanic Belt on northern Vancouver Island and the Pemberton Volcanic Belt along the coastal mainland. The Pemberton Belt began its formation when the former Farallon Plate was subducting under the British Columbia Coast 29 million years ago during the Oligocene epoch. At this time, the north-central portion of the Farallon Plate was just starting to subduct under the U.S. state of California, splitting it into northern and southern sections. Between 18 and five million years ago during the Miocene period, the northern remnant of the Farallon Plate fractured into two tectonic plates, known as the Gorda and Juan de Fuca plates. After this breakup, subduction of the Juan de Fuca Plate might have been coincident with the northern end of Vancouver Island eight million years ago during the late Miocene period. This is when the Alert Bay Belt became active. A brief interval of plate motion adjustment about 3.5 million years ago may have triggered the generation of basaltic magma along the descending plate edge. This eruptive period postdates the formation of the Garibaldi Belt and evidence for more recent volcanism in the Alert Bay Belt has not been found, indicating that volcanism in the Alert Bay Belt is likely extinct.

Bedrock under the Garibaldi chain consists of granitic and dioritic rocks of the Coast Plutonic Complex, which makes up much of the Coast Mountains. This is a large batholith complex that was formed when the Farallon and Kula plates were subducting along the western margin of the North American Plate during the Jurassic and Tertiary periods. It lies on island arc remnants, oceanic plateaus and clustered continental margins that were added along the western margin of North America between the Triassic and Cretaceous periods.

=== Formation ===
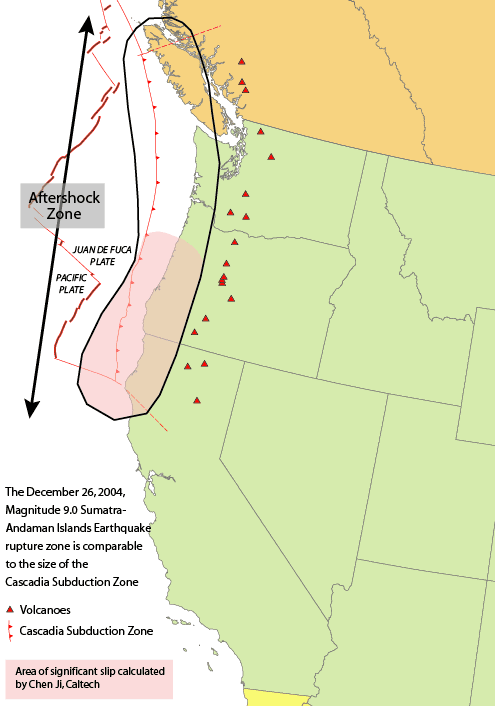
Area of the Cascadia subduction zone, including the Cascade Volcanic Arc (red triangles). The Garibaldi Volcanic Belt is shown here as three red triangles at the northernmost end of the arc.

The Garibaldi Belt has formed in response to ongoing subduction of the Juan de Fuca Plate under the North American Plate at the Cascadia subduction zone along the British Columbia Coast. This is a 1,094 km (680 mi) long fault zone running 80 km (50 mi) off the Pacific Northwest from Northern California to southwestern British Columbia. The plates move at a relative rate of over 10 mm (0.39 in) per year at a somewhat oblique angle to the subduction zone. Because of the very large fault area, the Cascadia subduction zone can produce large earthquakes of magnitude 7.0 or greater. The interface between the Juan de Fuca and North American plates remains locked for periods of roughly 500 years. During these periods, stress builds up on the interface between the plates and causes uplift of the North American margin. When the plate finally slips, the 500 years of stored energy are released in a mega-earthquake.

Unlike most subduction zones worldwide, there is no deep oceanic trench present in the bathymetry of the continental margin in Cascadia. This is because the mouth of the Columbia River empties directly into the subduction zone and deposits silt at the bottom of the Pacific Ocean to bury the oceanic trench. Massive floods from prehistoric Glacial Lake Missoula during the Late Pleistocene also deposited massive amounts of sediment into the trench. However, in common with other subduction zones, the outer margin is slowly being compressed, similar to a giant spring. When the stored energy is suddenly released by slippage across the fault at irregular intervals, the Cascadia subduction zone can create very large earthquakes, such as the magnitude 9.0 Cascadia earthquake on January 26, 1700. However, earthquakes along the Cascadia subduction zone are fewer than expected and there is evidence of a decline in volcanic activity over the past few million years. The probable explanation lies in the rate of convergence between the Juan de Fuca and North American plates. These two tectonic plates currently converge 3 cm (1.2 in) to 4 cm (1.6 in) per year. This is only about half the rate of convergence of seven million years ago.

Scientists have estimated that there have been at least 13 significant earthquakes along the Cascadia subduction zone in the past 6,000 years. The most recent, the 1700 Cascadia earthquake, was recorded in the oral traditions of the First Nations people on Vancouver Island. It caused considerable tremors and a massive tsunami that traveled across the Pacific Ocean. The significant shaking associated with this earthquake demolished houses of the Cowichan Tribes on Vancouver Island and caused several landslides. Shaking due to this earthquake made it too difficult for the Cowichan people to stand, and the tremors were so lengthy that they were sickened. The tsunami created by the earthquake ultimately devastated a winter village at Pachena Bay, killing all the people that lived there. The 1700 Cascadia earthquake caused near-shore subsidence, submerging marshes and forests on the coast that were later buried under more recent debris.

Many thousand years of dormancy are expected between large explosive eruptions of volcanoes in the Garibaldi Belt. A possible explanation for the lower rates of volcanism in the Garibaldi chain is that the associated terrain is being compressed in contrast to the more southern portions of the Cascade Arc. In continental rift zones, magma is able to push its way up through the Earth's crust rapidly along faults, providing less chance for differentiation. This is likely the case south of Mount Hood to the California border and east-southeast of the massive Newberry shield volcano adjacent to the Cascade Range in central Oregon because the Brothers Fault Zone lies in this region. This rift zone might explain the massive amounts of basaltic lava in this part of the central Cascade Arc. A low convergence rate in a compressional setting with massive stationary bodies of magma under the surface could explain the low volume and differentiated magmas throughout the Garibaldi Volcanic Belt. In 1958, Canadian volcanologist Bill Mathews proposed there could be a connection between regional glaciation of the North American continent during glacial periods and higher rates of volcanic activity during regional glacial unload of the continent. However, this is hard to predict due to the infrequent geological record in this region. But there is specific data, including the temporal grouping of eruptions synglacially or just postglacial within the Garibaldi Belt, that suggests this could be probable.

=== Glaciovolcanism ===
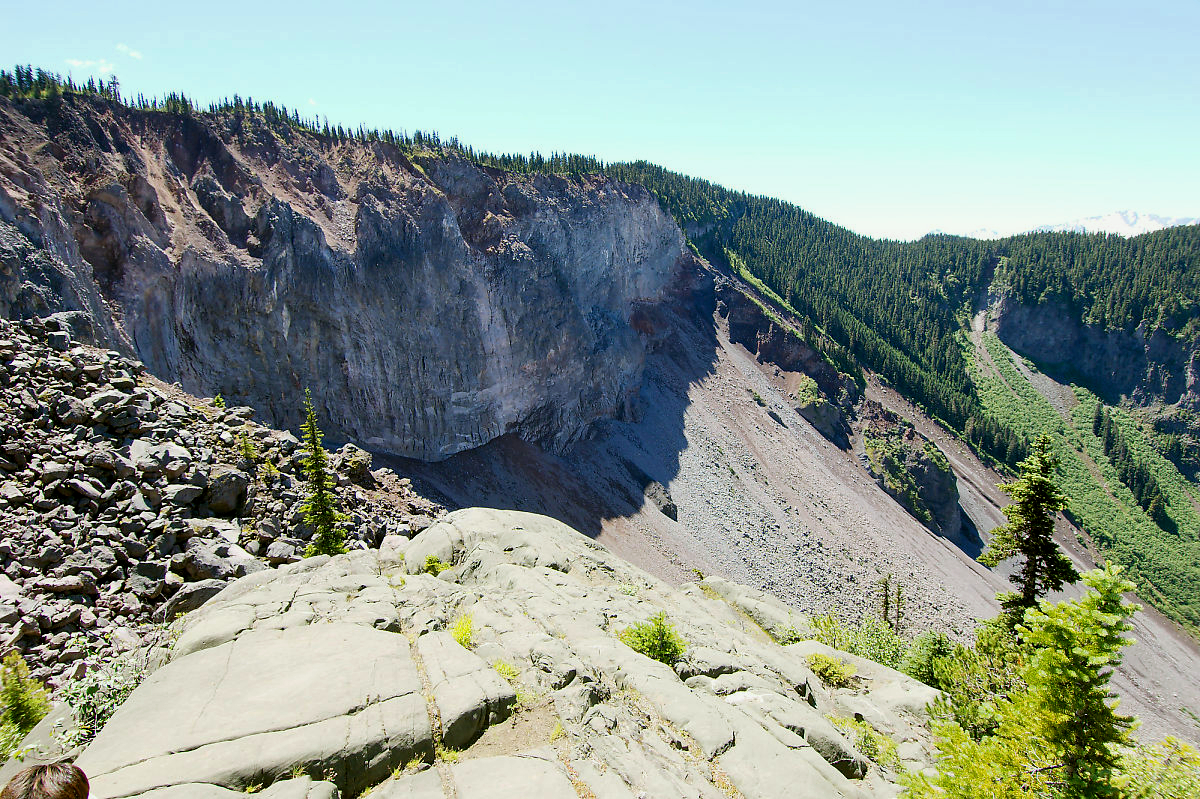
The edge of The Barrier ice-marginal lava flow. Debris extending down the edge of The Barrier is where historical landslides have occurred.

Dominating the Garibaldi chain are volcanoes and other volcanic formations that formed during periods of intense glaciation. This includes flow-dominated tuyas, subglacial lava domes and ice-marginal lava flows. Flow-dominated tuyas differ from the typical basaltic tuyas throughout British Columbia in that they are composed of piles of flat-lying lava flows and lack hyaloclastite and pillow lava. They are interpreted to have formed as a result of magma intruding into and melting a vertical hole through adjacent glacial ice that eventually breached the surface of the glacier. As this magma ascends, it ponds and spreads into horizontal layers. Lava domes that were formed mainly during subglacial activity comprise steep flanks made of intense columnar joints and volcanic glass. Ice-marginal lava flows form when lava erupts from a subaerial vent and ponds against glacial ice. The Barrier, a lava dam impounding Garibaldi Lake in the southern segment, is the best represented ice-marginal lava flow in the Garibaldi Belt.

Flow-dominated tuyas and the absence of subglacial fragmental deposits are two uncommon glaciovolcanic features in the Garibaldi chain. This is due to their different lava compositions and decline of direct lava-water contact during volcanic activity. The lava composition of these volcanic edifies changes their structure because eruption temperatures are lower than those associated with basaltic activity and lava containing silica increases thickness and glass differentiation temperatures. As a result, subglacial volcanoes that erupt silicic content melt less qualities of ice and are not as likely to contain water close to the volcanic vent. This forms volcanoes with structures that display their relationship with the regional glaciation. The surrounding landscape also changes the flow of meltwater, favouring lava to pond within valleys dominated by glacial ice. And if the edifice is eroded, it could change the prominence of fragmental glaciovolcanic deposits as well.

=== Southern segment ===
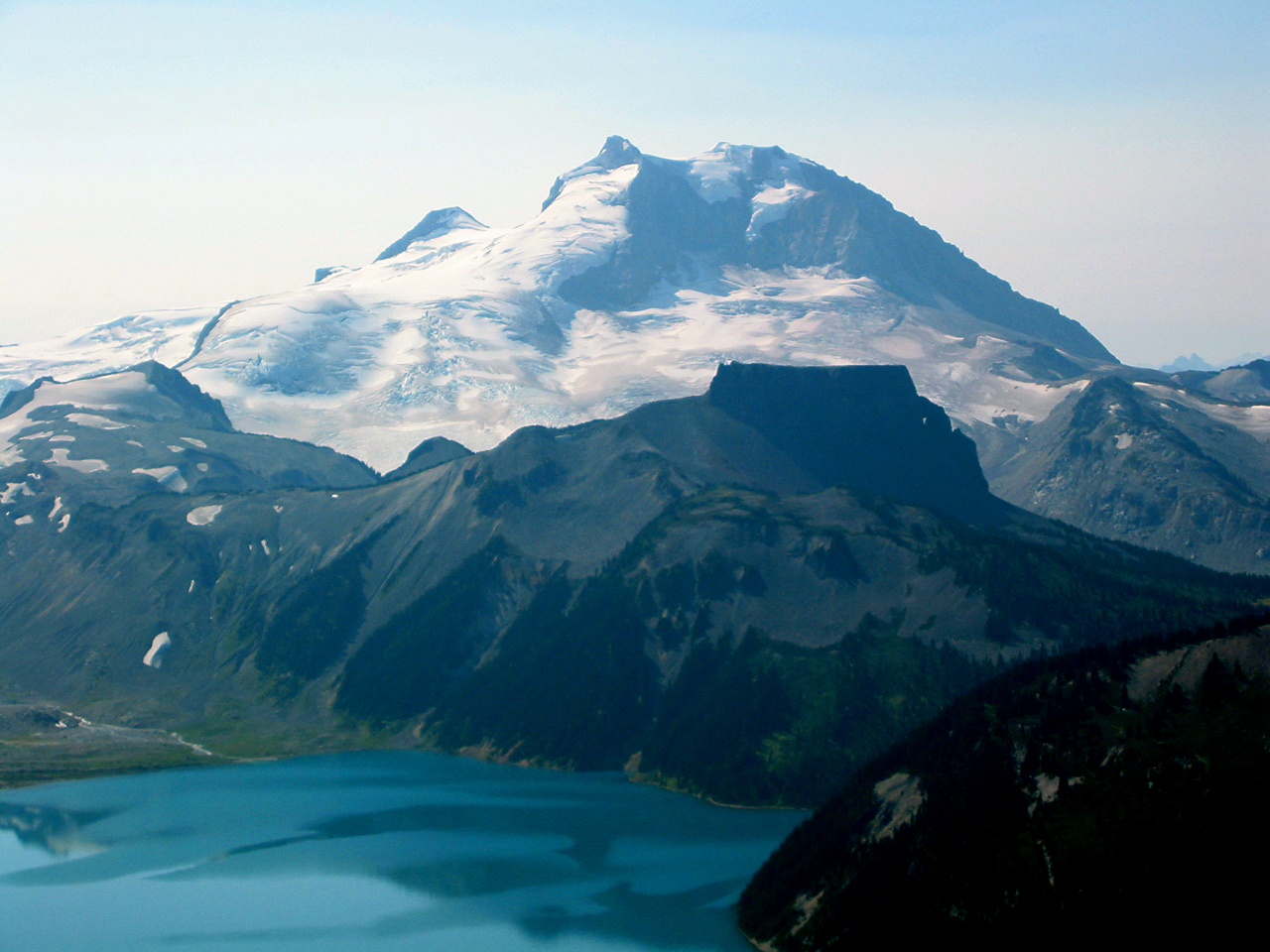
North face of Mount Garibaldi. The Table is the flat-topped steep-sided edifice in the foreground rising above Garibaldi Lake.

On the eastern side of Howe Sound lies the southernmost zone of volcanic activity in the Garibaldi chain. This zone, known as the Watts Point volcanic centre, is a small outcrop of volcanic rock that is a portion of a subglacial volcano. The outcrop covers an area of about 0.2 km^{2} (0.077 mi^{2}) and an eruptive volume of roughly 0.02 km^{3} (0.0048 mi^{3}). The location is heavily forested and the BC Rail mainline passes through the lower portion of the outcrop about 40 m (130 ft) above sea level. It represents a feature in the Squamish volcanic field.

Mount Garibaldi, one of the larger volcanoes in the southern Garibaldi Belt with a volume of 6.5 km^{3} (1.6 mi^{3}), is composed of dacite lavas that were erupted in the past 300,000 years. It was constructed when volcanic material erupted onto a portion of the Cordilleran Ice Sheet during the Pleistocene period. This created the unique asymmetrical shape of the mountain. Successive landslides on Garibaldi's flanks occurred after glacial ice of the Cordilleran Ice Sheet retreated. Subsequent volcanism about 9,300 years ago produced a 15 km (9.3 mi) long dacite lava flow from Opal Cone on Garibaldi's southeastern flank. This is unusually long for a dacite flow, which commonly travel only short distances from a volcanic vent due to their high viscosity. The Opal Cone lava flow represents one of the most recent volcanic features at Mount Garibaldi.

On the western shore of Garibaldi Lake, Mount Price represents a stratovolcano with an elevation of 2,050 m (6,730 ft). It was constructed during three periods of activity. The first phase 1.2 million years ago formed a hornblende andesite stratovolcano on the drift-covered floor of a circular basin. After this stratovolcano was constructed, volcanism moved to the west where a series of andesite-dacite lava flows and pyroclastic flows were extruded during a period of Peléan activity 300,000 years ago. This created the 2,050 m (6,730 ft) high cone of Mount Price, which was later buried under glacial ice. Before Mount Price was overridden by glacial ice, volcanic activity took place on its northern flank where a satellite vent is present. Renewed activity took place at Clinker Peak on the western flank of Mount Price around 13,000 years ago. This produced the Rubble Creek and Clinker Ridge andesite lava flows that extend 6 km (3.7 mi) to the northwest and southwest. After these flows traveled 6 km (3.7 mi), they were dammed against glacial ice to form an ice-marginal lava flow more than 250 m (820 ft) thick known as The Barrier.

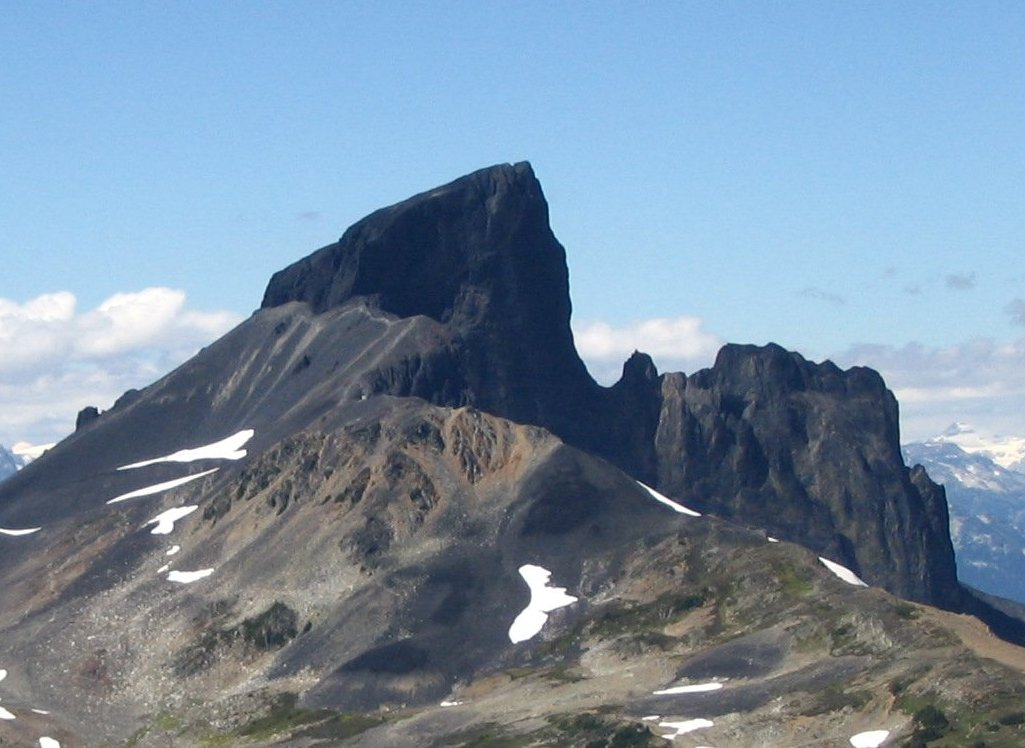
The Black Tusk viewed from the southeast. Its craggy edifice is the result of prolonged erosion.

Cinder Cone on the north shore of Garibaldi Lake is a cinder cone partly engulfed by the Helmet Glacier. It consists of volcanic ash, lapilli and dispersed ropy and lava bomb segments that bring the cone's prominence to 500 m (1,600 ft). Its minimal degree of erosion indicates that it might have erupted in the past 1,000 years. A series of basaltic andesite flows were erupted from Cinder Cone about 11,000 years ago that traveled into a deep north trending U-shaped valley on the eastern flank of The Black Tusk. Subsequent volcanism produced another sequence of basaltic lava flows 4,000 years ago that flowed in the same glacial valley.

The Black Tusk, a black pinnacle of volcanic rock on the northwestern shore of Garibaldi Lake, is the glacially eroded remnant of a much larger volcano that formed during two periods of volcanic activity. The first between 1.1 and 1.3 million years ago erupted hornblende andesite lava flows and tuffs. These volcanics compose mountain ridges southwest, southeast and northwest of the prime volcanic structure. Subsequent erosion demolished the newly formed volcano. This ultimately exposed the roots of the cone, which currently form the rugged edifice of The Black Tusk. After the cone was eroded, a series of hypersthene andesite lava flows were erupted between 0.17 and 0.21 million years ago. These end at adjacent ice-marginal lava flows that form 100 m (330 ft) cliffs. This eruptive phase also produced a lava dome that comprises the current 2,316 m (7,598 ft) high pinnacle. Consequently, the regional Late Pleistocene ice sheet carved a deep north-trending U-shaped valley into the eastern flank of the second-stage cone. Here, subsequent lava flows from Cinder Cone filled the valley.

=== Central segment ===
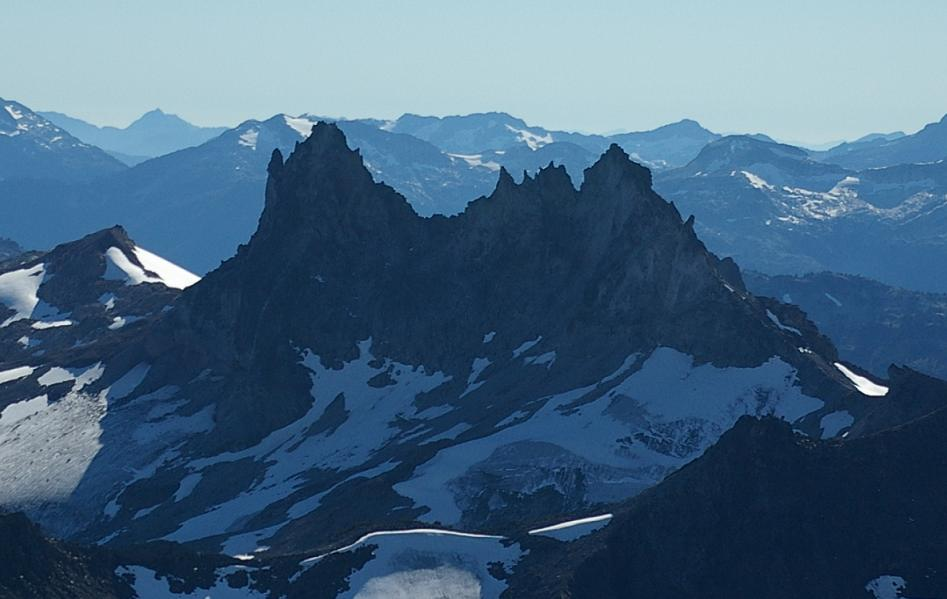
Mount Fee and its jagged ridge

Immediately southeast of Mount Cayley lies Mount Fee, an extensively eroded volcano containing a north–south trending ridge. It is one of the older volcanic features in the central Garibaldi chain. Its volcanics are undated, but its large amount of dissection and evidence of glacial ice overriding the volcano indicates that it formed more than 75,000 years ago before the Wisconsinan Glaciation. Therefore, volcanism at Mount Fee does not display evidence of interaction with glacial ice. The remaining product from Fee's earliest volcanic activity is a minor portion of pyroclastic rock. This is evidence of explosive volcanism from Fee's eruptive history, as well as its first volcanic event. The second volcanic event produced a sequence of lavas and breccias on the eastern flank of the main ridge. These volcanics were likely placed when a sequence of lava flows and broken lava fragments erupted from a volcanic vent and moved down the flanks during the construction of a large volcano. Following extensive dissection, renewed volcanism produced a viscous series of lava flows forming its narrow, flat-topped, steep-sided northern limit and the northern end of the main ridge. The conduit for which these lava flows originated from was likely vertical in structure and intruded through older volcanics deposited during Fee's earlier volcanic events. This volcanic event was also followed by a period of erosion, and likely one or more glacial periods. Extensive erosion following the last volcanic event at Mount Fee has created the rugged north–south trending ridge that currently forms a prominent landmark.

Ember Ridge, a volcanic mountain ridge between Tricouni Peak and Mount Fee, consists of at least eight lava domes composed of andesite. They were likely formed between 25,000 and 10,000 years ago when lava erupted beneath glacial ice of the Fraser Glaciation. Their current structures are comparable to their original forms due to the minimal degree of erosion. As a result, the domes display the shaps and columnar joints typical of subglacial volcanoes. The random shaps of the Ember Ridge domes are the result of erupted lava taking advantage of former ice pockets, eruptions taking place on uneven surfaces, subsidence of the domes during volcanic activity to create rubble and separation of older columnar units during more recent eruptions. The northern dome, known as Ember Ridge North, covers the summit and eastern flank of a mountain ridge. It comprises at least one lava flow that reaches a thickness of 100 m (330 ft), as well as the thinnest columnar units in the Mount Cayley volcanic field. The small size of the columnar joints indicates that the erupted lava was cooled immediately and are mainly located on the dome's summit. Ember Ridge Northeast, the smallest subglacial dome of Ember Ridge, comprises one lava flow that has a thickness no more than 40 m (130 ft). Ember Ridge Northwest, the most roughly circular subglacial dome, comprises at least one lava flow. Ember Ridge Southeast is the most complex of the Ember Ridge domes, consisting of a series of lava flows with a thickness of 60 m (200 ft). It is also the only Ember Ridge dome that contains large amounts of rubble. Ember Ridge Southwest comprises at least one lava flow that reaches a thickness of 80 m (260 ft). It is the only subglacial dome of Ember Ridge that contains hyaloclastite. Ember Ridge West comprises only one lava flow that reaches a thickness of 60 m (200 ft).

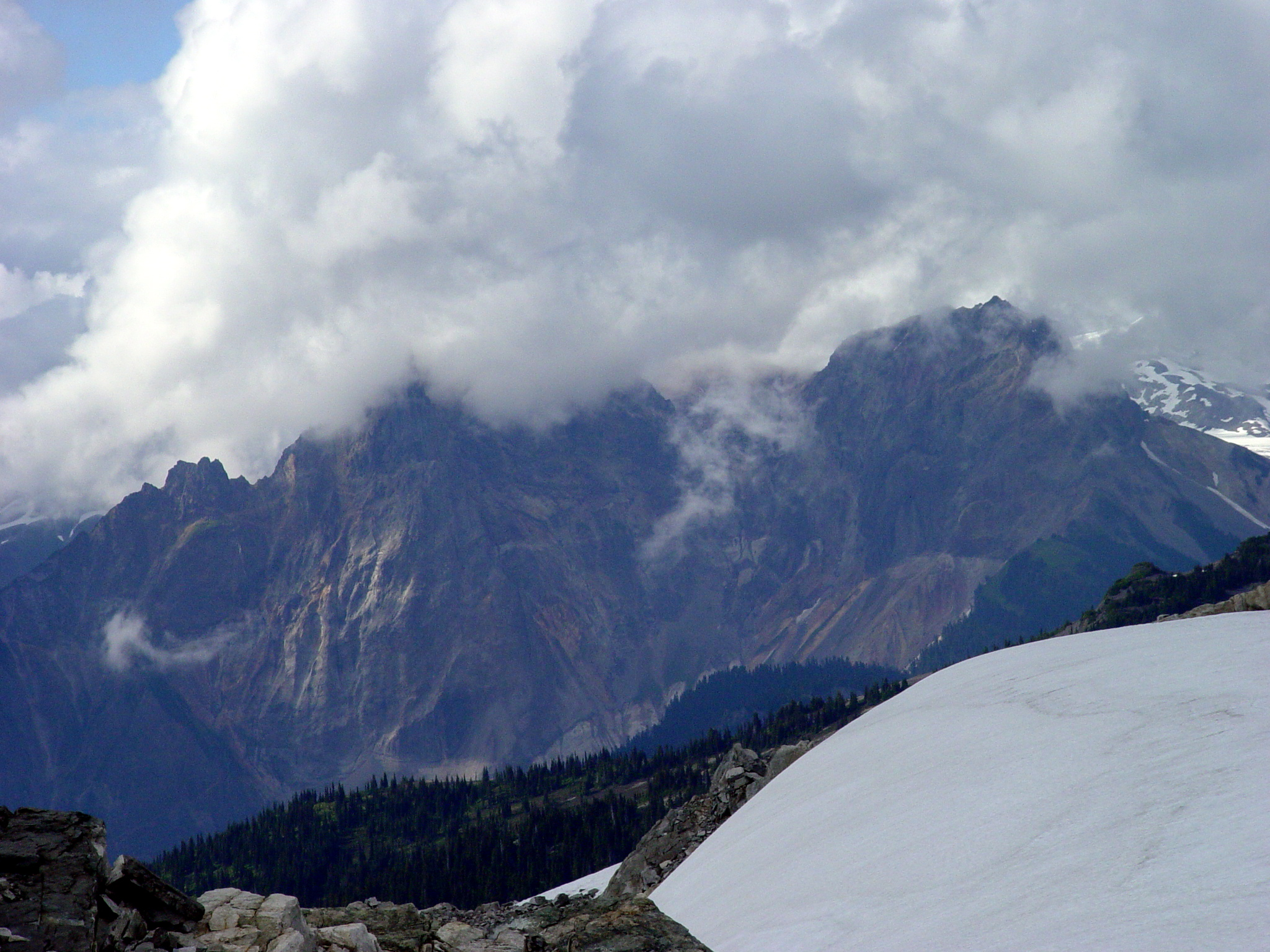
South face of Pyroclastic Peak, the second highest peak of the Mount Cayley massif.

To the northwest, Mount Cayley constitutes the largest and most persistent volcano in the central Garibaldi Belt. It is a highly eroded stratovolcano composed of dacite and rhyodacite lava that was deposited during three phases of volcanic activity. The first eruptive phase started about four million years ago with the eruption of dacite lava flows and pyroclastic rock. This resulted in the creation of Mount Cayley itself. Subsequent volcanism during this volcanic phase constructed a significant lava dome. This acts like a volcanic plug and composes the lava spines that currently form pinnacles on Cayley's rugged summit. After Mount Cayley was constructed, lava flows, tephra and welded dacite rubble were erupted. This second phase of activity 2.7 ± 0.7 million years ago resulted in the creation of the Vulcan's Thumb, a craggy volcanic ridge on the southern flank of Mount Cayley. Lengthy dissection from an extended period of erosion demolished much of the original stratovolcano. Volcanic activity after this prolonged period of erosion produced thick dacite lava flows from parasitic vents 300,000 years ago that extended into the Turbid and Shovelnose Creek valleys near the Squamish River. This subsequently created two minor parasitic lava domes 200,000 years ago. These three volcanic events are in contrast to several others around Cayley in that they do not show signs of interaction with glacial ice.

Pali Dome, an eroded volcano north of Mount Cayley, consists of two geological units. Pail Dome East is composed of a mass of andesite lava flows and small amounts of pyroclastic material. It lies on the eastern portion of the large glacial icefield that covers much of the Mount Cayley volcanic field. Much of the lava flows form gentle topography at high elevations but terminate in finely jointed vertical cliffs at low elevations. The first volcanic activity likely occurred about 25,000 years ago, but it could also be significantly older. The most recent volcanic activity produced a series of lava flows that were erupted when the vent area was not covered by glacial ice. However, the flows show evidence of interaction with glacial ice in their lower units. This indicates that the lavas were erupted about 10,000 years ago during the waning stages of the Fraser Glaciation. The ice-marginal lava flows reach thicknesses of up to 100 m (330 ft). Pali Dome West consists of at least three andesite lava flows and small amounts of pyroclastic material; its vent is presently buried under glacial ice. At least three eruptions have occurred at Pali Dome East. The age of the first volcanic eruption is unknown, but it could have occurred in the past 10,000 years. The second eruption produced a lava flow that was erupted when the vent area was not buried under glacial ice. However, the flow does show evidence of interaction with glacial ice at its lower unit. This indicates that the lavas were erupted during the waning stages of the Fraser Glaciation. The third and most recent eruption produced another lava flow that was largely erupted above glacial ice, but was probably constrained on its northern margin by a small glacier. Unlike the lava flow that was erupted during the second eruption, this lava flow was not impounded by glacial ice at its lower unit. This suggests that it erupted less than 10,000 years ago when the regional Fraser Glaciation retreated.

Cauldron Dome, a subglacial volcano north of Mount Cayley, lies west of the massive glacier covering much the region. Like Pali Dome, it is composed of two geological units. Upper Cauldron Dome is a flat-topped, oval-shaped pile of at least five andesite lava flows that resembles a tuya. The five andesite flows are columnar jointed and were likely extruded through glacial ice. The latest volcanic activity might have occurred between 10,000 and 25,000 years ago when this area was still influenced by glacial ice of the Fraser Glaciation. Lower Cauldron Dome, the youngest unit comprising the entire Cauldron Dome subglacial volcano, consists of a flat-topped, steep-sided pile of andesite lava flows 1,800 m (5,900 ft) long and a maximum thickness of 220 m (720 ft). These volcanics were extruded about 10,000 years ago during the waning stages of the Fraser Glaciation from a vent adjacent to upper Cauldron Dome that is currently buried under glacial ice.

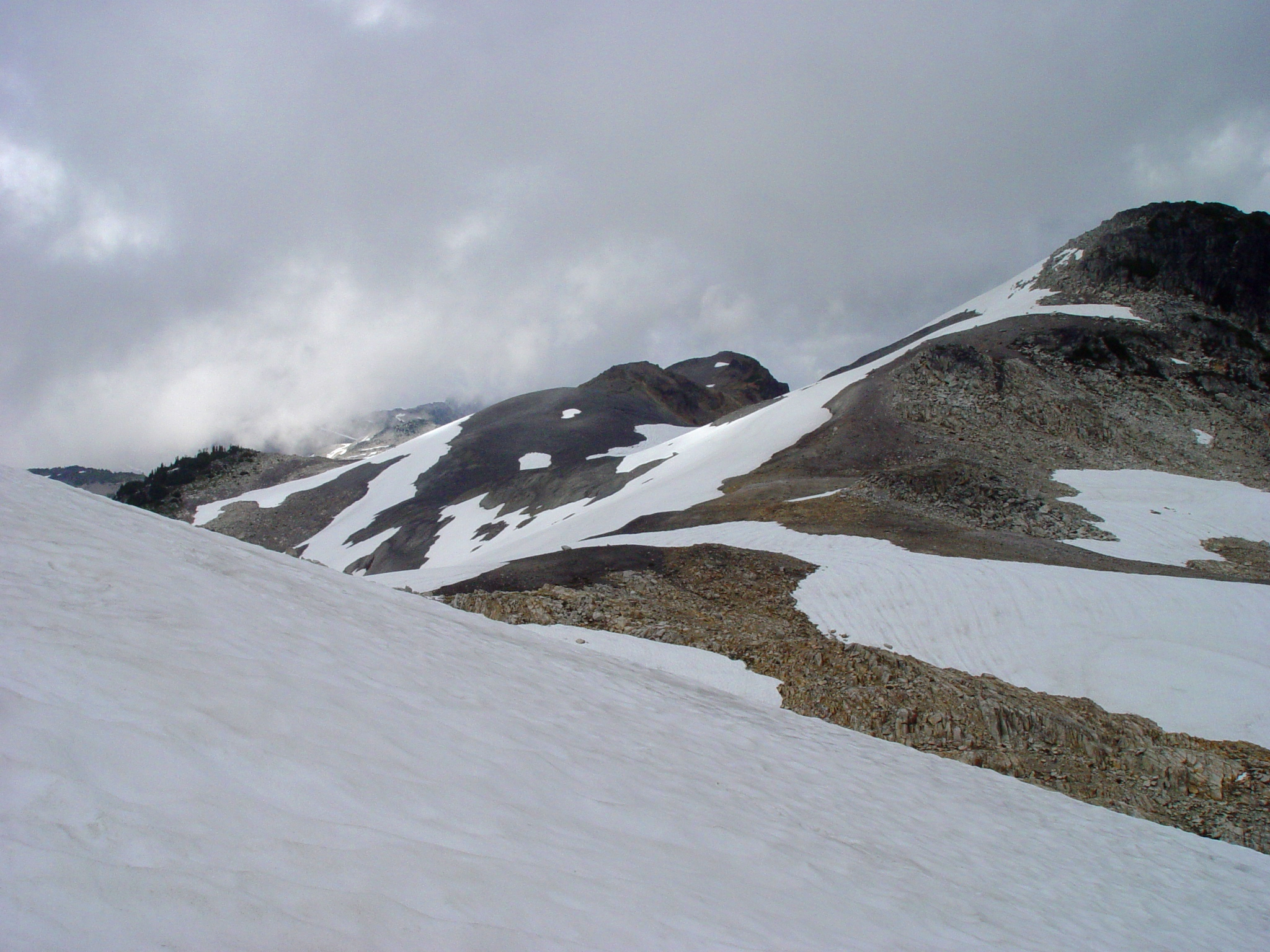
Volcanic rubble in the Mount Cayley area. Its ridge-like structure provides easy travel to the north towards Mount Fee.

Lying at the northern portion of the Mount Cayley volcanic field is a subglacial volcano named Slag Hill. At least two geologic units compose the edifice. Slag Hill proper consists of andesite lava flows and small amounts of pyroclastic rock. Lying on the western portion of Slag Hill is a lava flow that likely erupted less than 10,000 years ago due to the lack of features indicating volcano-ice interactions. The Slag Hill flow-dominated tuya 900 m (3,000 ft) northeast of Slag Hill proper consists of a flat-topped, steep-sided pile of andesite. It protrudes through remnants of volcanic material erupted from the Slag Hill proper, but it represents a separate volcanic vent due to its geographical appearance. This small subglacial volcano possibly formed between 25,000 and 10,000 years ago throughout the waning stages of the Fraser Glaciation.

Ring Mountain, a flow-dominated tuya lying at the northern portion of the Mount Cayley volcanic field, consists of a pile of at least five andesite lava flows lying on a mountain ridge. Its steep-sided flanks reach heights of 500 m (1,600 ft) and are composed of volcanic rubble. This makes it impossible to measure its exact base elevation or how many lava flows constitute the edifice. With a summit elevation of 2,192 m (7,192 ft), Ring Mountain had its last volcanic activity between 25,000 and 10,000 years ago when the Fraser Glaciation was close to its maximum. Northwest of Ring Mountain lies a minor andesite lava flow. Its chemistry is somewhat unlike other andesite flows comprising Ring Mountain, but it probably erupted from a volcanic vent adjacent to or at Ring Mountain. The part of it that lies higher in elevation contains some features that indicate lava-ice interactions, while the lower-elevation portion of it does not. Therefore, this minor lava flow was likely extruded after Ring Mountain formed but when glacial ice covered a broader area than it does currently, and that the lava flow extends beyond the region in which glacial ice existed at that time.

=== Northern segment ===
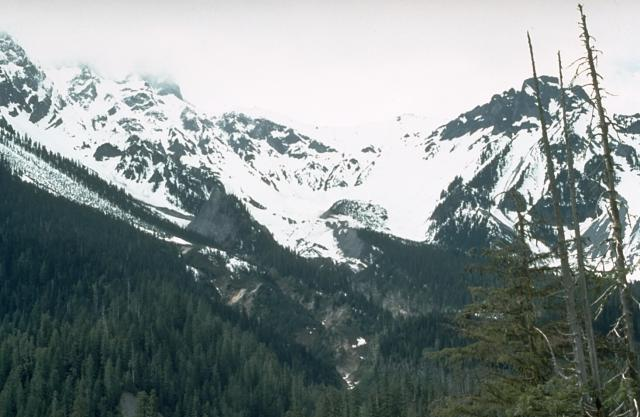
Northern flank of the Mount Meager massif. The volcanic vent that produced its latest eruption 2,350 years ago is the bowl-shaped depression in the middle of this image.

The Mount Meager massif is the most voluminous composite volcano in the Garibaldi chain and British Columbia, as well as the most recent to erupt. It has a volume of 20 km^{3} (4.8 mi^{3}) and consists of an eroded stratovolcano, ranging in composition from andesite to rhyodacite. Several dissected lava domes and volcanic plugs are present on its glaciated summit, as well as a clearly defined volcanic crater with a lava dome placed within it. At least eight volcanic vents compose the complex and have been the sources for volcanic activity throughout massif's 2.2 million year history. A well-documented history of volcanism is present at the Mount Meager massif, with its most recent eruption about 2,350 years ago that was similar in character to the 1980 eruption of Mount St. Helens and the continuous eruption of Soufrière Hills on the island of Montserrat. This is the largest recorded Holocene explosive eruption in Canada, originating from a volcanic vent on the northeastern flank of Plinth Peak. It was Plinian in nature, sending an eruption column at least 20 km (12 mi) high into the stratosphere. As prevailing winds carried ash of the column eastwards, it deposited across British Columbia and Alberta. Subsequent pyroclastic flows were sent down the flanks of Plinth Peak for 7 km (4.3 mi) and were later succeeded by the eruption of a lava flow that demolished many times. This created thick agglutinated rubble that successfully blocked the adjacent Lillooet River to form a lake. Subsequently, the breccia dam collapsed to produce a catastrophic flood that deposited house-sized boulders more than 1 km (0.62 mi) downstream. After the flood took place, a small dacite lava flow was erupted that later solidified to form a series of well-preserved columnar joints. This is the last phase of the 2350 BP eruption, and subsequent stream erosion has cut through this lava flow to form a waterfall.

A group of small volcanoes on the upper Bridge River, known as the Bridge River Cones, includes stratovolcanoes, volcanic plugs and lava flows. These volcanoes are unlike others throughout the Garibaldi Volcanic Belt in that they are mainly composed of volcanic rocks with mafic compositions, including alkaline basalt and hawaiite. The different magma compositions might be related to a smaller degree of partial melting in the Earth's mantle or a descending plate edge effect. The oldest volcano in the group, known as Sham Hill, is a 60 m (200 ft) high volcanic plug with a potassium-argon date of one million years. It is about 300 m (980 ft) wide and its uncovered glaciated surface is strewn with glacial erratics. Its massive level rock columns were constructed inside the main volcanic vent of a stratovolcano that has since been reduced by erosion. To the southeast, the Salal Glacier volcanic complex was constructed between 970,000 and 590,000 years ago. It consists of subaerial tephra and thin lava flow deposits that are surrounded by 100 m (330 ft) thick ice-ponded lava flows. These ice-marginal lava flows were created when lava ponded against glacial ice in the nearby valleys before the Wisconsin Glaciation. North of the Salal Glacier complex lies a small basaltic stratovolcano named Tuber Hill. It began to form about 600,000 years ago when adjacent valleys were filled by glacial ice. When lava flows were erupted from Tuber Hill, they interacted with the valley-filling glaciers on its southern flank and produced a glacial meltwater lake. Here, more than 150 m (490 ft) of stacked hyaloclastite, lahars and lacustrine tuff were deposited. A series of pillow lavas were also deposited during this eruptive period. The most recent volcanic activity in the Bridge River volcanic field produced a series of basaltic lava flows in the regional valleys that overlie till of the last glacial period. The age of these valley-filling lava flows is unknown but the presence of unconsolidated glacial till under the flows suggests that they are less than 1,500 years old.

To the northwest, the Franklin Glacier Complex is a set of volcanic bedrock that encompasses an area 20 km (12 mi) long and 6 km (3.7 mi) wide. It has an elevation of over 2,000 m (6,600 ft) and is largely destroyed by erosion. A series of dikes and subvolcanic intrusions compose the complex, a few of which seem to represent vents for the overlying sequence of volcanic deposits. Volcanics include dacite breccia and small remnants of hornblende andesite lava flows associated with tuffs that reach 450 m (1,480 ft) thick. The complex is poorly known due to minimal studies, but potassium-argon dates obtained from some of the subvolcanic intrusions indicate that Franklin formed during two volcanic events, each separated by about five million years of dormancy. The first event occurred between six and eight million years ago when volcanic activity in the Garibaldi Belt had not moved to its current location, but was becoming more aerially restricted within a large band to the east and west. During this period, volcanic activity in the Garibaldi Belt and other portions of the northern Cascade Arc took place mainly at the Franklin Glacier Complex and in the Intermontane Belt further east. When the Garibaldi Belt moved to its current location five million years ago, another volcanic event occurred at the Franklin complex. This final and most recent volcanic event occurred between two and three million years ago, about a million years after Mount Cayley to the south began its formation.

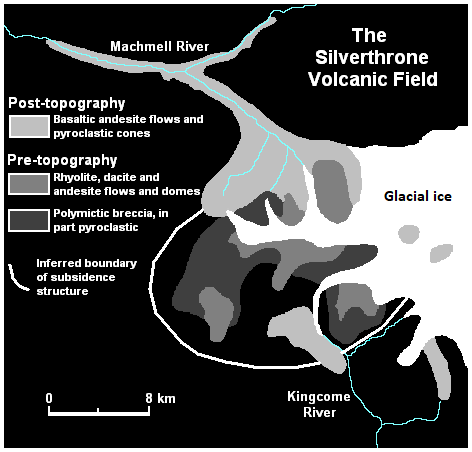
Geologic map of the Silverthrone volcanic field and nearby rivers. The white circular feature is the inferred boundary of the Silverthrone Caldera.

Silverthrone Caldera is the largest and best-preserved of the two caldera complexes in the northern Garibaldi chain, the other being the Franklin Glacier Complex 55 km (34 mi) to the east-southeast. The caldera has a diameter of 20 km (12 mi) and contains breccia, lava flows and lava domes. Like Franklin to the east-southeast, the geology of Silverthrone is poorly known due to minimal studies. The region surrounding the Silverthrone complex is significantly jagged due to the mountainous terrain of the Coast Mountains. Near vertical flanks extend from near sea level to more than 3,000 m (9,800 ft) in elevation. Silverthrone is significantly younger than the Franklin Glacier Complex to the east-southeast and its volcanics likely have ages comparable to other volcanics throughout the Garibaldi chain. The oldest volcanics at the Silverthrone Caldera complex are composed of volcanic breccias, some of which became fused together by intense volcanic heat from when the deposits were first erupted. After these volcanics were deposited, a series of dacite, andesite and rhyolite lava flows were erupted upon volcanic breccia from the first volcanic phase. These eroded lava flows in total are 900 m (3,000 ft) thick. Volcanics in the lower portion of this series of lava flows give a potassium-argon date of 750,000 years while volcanics slightly above the lava flows are 400,000 years old. The most recent volcanic activity produced a series of andesite and basaltic andesite lava flows down Pashleth Creek and the Machmell and Kingcome river valleys. The lava flow extending from near Pashleth Creek to down the Machmell River valley is over 25 km (16 mi) in length. Its small amount of erosion indicates that it could be 1,000 years old or younger.

=== Geothermal and seismic activity ===
At least four volcanoes have had seismic activity since 1985, including Mount Garibaldi (three events), Mount Cayley (four events), Mount Meager massif (seventeen events) and the Silverthrone Caldera (two events). Seismic data suggest that these volcanoes still contain active magma chambers, indicating that some Garibaldi Belt volcanoes are likely active, with significant potential hazards. The seismic activity corresponds with some of Canada's recently formed volcanoes and with persistent volcanoes that have had major explosive activity throughout their history, such as Mount Garibaldi and the Mount Cayley and Mount Meager massifs.

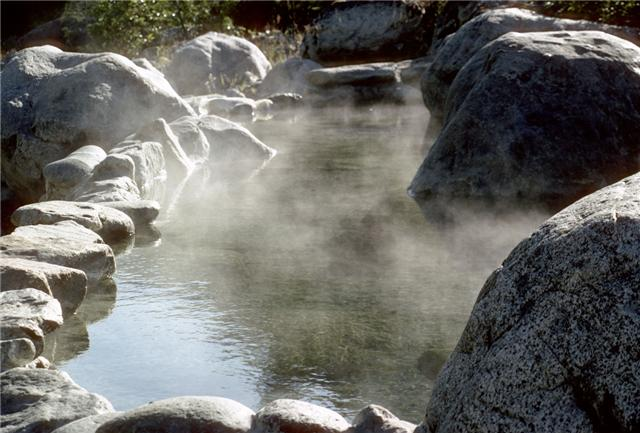
A volcanic hot spring near Meager Creek related to volcanism at the Mount Meager massif. This hot spring lies in one of the few hot spring clusters near Meager.

A series of hot springs adjacent to the Lillooet River valley, such as the Harrison, Sloquet, Clear Creek and Skookumchuck springs, are not known to occur near areas with recent volcanic activity. Instead, many are located close to 16–26 million year old intrusions that are interpreted to be the roots of heavily eroded volcanoes. These volcanoes formed part of the Cascade Volcanic Arc during the Miocene period and their intrusive roots extend from the Fraser Valley in the south to Salal Creek in the north. The relationship of these hot springs to the Garibaldi Belt is not clear. However, a few hot springs are known to exist in areas that have experienced relatively recent volcanic activity. About five hot springs exist in valleys near Mount Cayley and two small groups of hot springs are present at the Mount Meager massif. The springs at Meager massif might be evidence of a shallow magma chamber beneath the surface. No hot springs are known to exist at Mount Garibaldi like those found at Mount Meager and Mount Cayley, although there is evidence of abnormal high heat flow at the adjacent Table Meadows and other locations. Abnormal warm water adjacent to Britannia Beach could be geothermal activity linked to the Watts Point volcanic zone.

== History ==
=== Human occupation ===
People have used resources in and around the Garibaldi Volcanic Belt for centuries. Obsidian was collected by the Squamish Nation for making knives, chisels, adzes and other sharp tools in pre-contact times. This material appears in sites dated 10,000 years old up to protohistoric time periods. The source for this material is found in upper parts of the mountainous terrain that surround Mount Garibaldi. At Opal Cone, lava of the Ring Creek flow was normally heated to cook food because its pumice-like texture is able to maintain heat. It also did not break after it was used for a long period of time.

A large pumice outcrop adjacent to the Mount Meager massif has been mined several times in the past, and extends more than 2,000 m (6,600 ft) in length and 1,000 m (3,300 ft) in width with a thickness of about 300 m (980 ft). The deposit was first hired by J. MacIsaac, who died in the late 1970s. In the mid-1970s the second hirer, W.H. Willes, investigated and mined the pumice. It was crushed, removed then stored close to the village of Pemberton. Later, the bridge that was used to access the pumice deposit was washed out. Mining operations resumed in 1988 when the deposit was staked by L.B. Bustin. In 1990, the pumice outcrop was bought by D.R. Carefoot from the owners B. Chore and M. Beaupre. In a program from 1991 to 1992, workers evaluated the deposit for its properties as a construction material, absorber of oil and stonewash. About 7,500 m^{3} (260,000 ft^{3}) of pumice was mined in 1998 by the Great Pacific Pumice Incorporation.

The hot springs associated with Meager and Cayley have made these two volcanoes targets for geothermal explorations. At Mount Cayley, temperatures of 50 °C (122 °F) to more than 100 °C (212 °F) have been measured in shallow boreholes on its southwestern flank. Further north, geothermal exploration at the Mount Meager massif has been undertaken by BC Hydro since the late 1970s. Bottom hole temperatures have been calculated at an average of 220 °C (428 °F) to 240 °C (464 °F), with 275 °C (527 °F) being the highest recorded temperature. This indicates that the area around Meager is a major geothermal site. The geothermal power is expected to run throughout Western Canada and the likelihood of it extending into the western United States is probable.

=== Early impressions ===
The belt of volcanoes has been the subject of myths and legends by First Nations. To the Squamish Nation, Mount Garibaldi is called Nch'kay. In their language it means "Dirty Place". This name of the mountain refers to the volcanic rubble in the area. This mountain, like others located in the area, is considered sacred as it plays an important part of their history. In their oral history, they passed down a story of the flood covering the land. During this time, only two mountains peaked over the water, and Garibaldi was one of them. It was here that the remaining survivors of the flood latched their canoes to the peak and waited for the waters to subside. The Black Tusk on the northwestern end of Garibaldi Lake and Mount Cayley northwest of Mount Garibaldi are called tak'takmu'yin tl'a in7in'axa7en in the Squamish language, which means "Landing Place of the Thunderbird". The Thunderbird is a legendary creature in North American indigenous peoples' history and culture. The rocks that make up The Black Tusk and Mount Cayley were said to have been burnt black by the Thunderbird's lightning.

=== Protection and monitoring ===
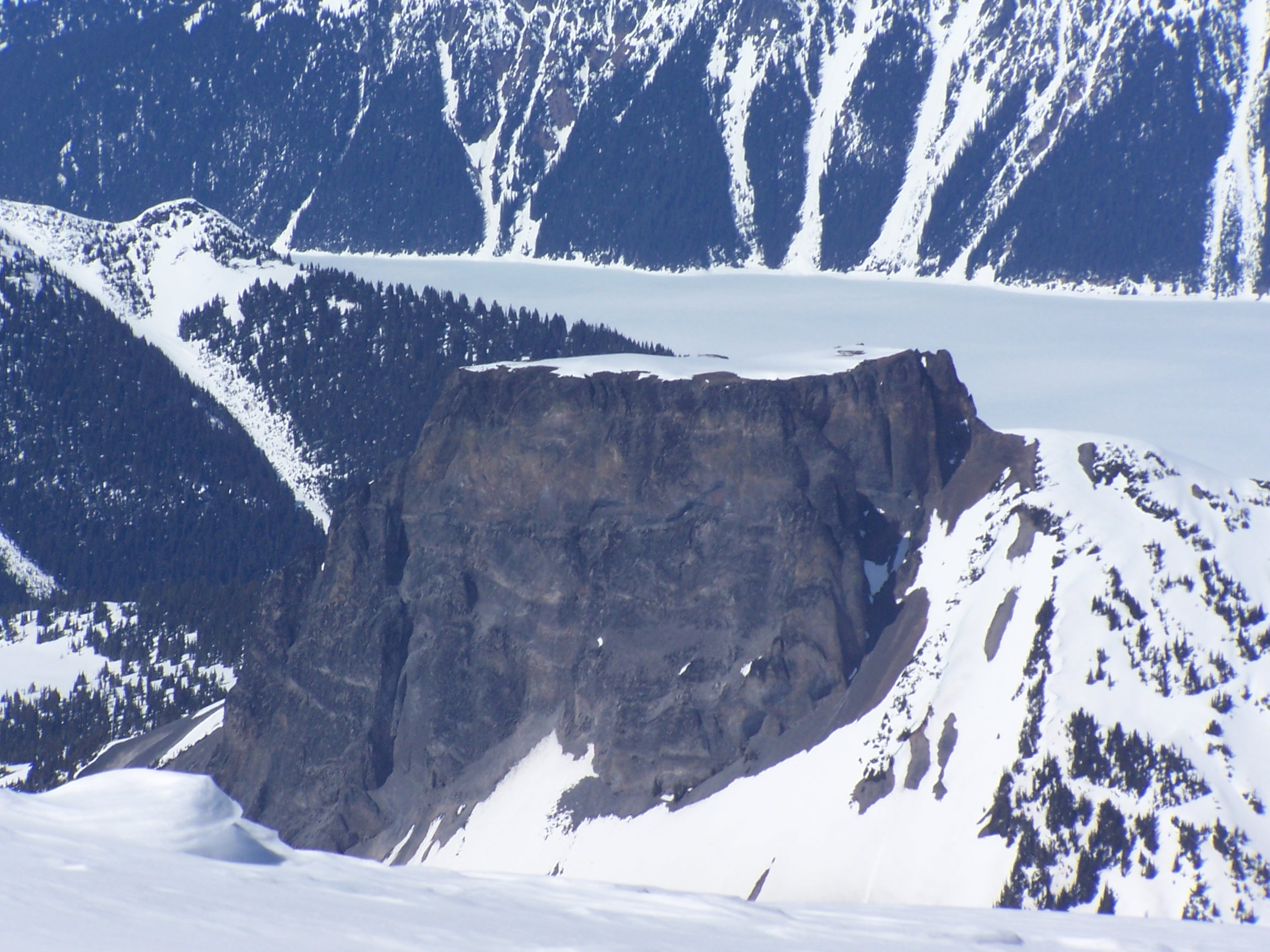
The Table, a flow-dominated tuya rising above the southwestern side of Garibaldi Lake.

A number of volcanic features in the Garibaldi Belt are protected by provincial parks. Garibaldi Provincial Park at the southern end of the chain was established in 1927 to protect the abundant geological history, glaciated mountains and other natural resources in the region. It was named after the 2,678 m (8,786 ft) stratovolcano Mount Garibaldi, which in turn was named after the Italian military and political leader Giuseppe Garibaldi in 1860. To the northwest, Brandywine Falls Provincial Park protects Brandywine Falls, a 70 m (230 ft) high waterfall composed of at least four basaltic lava flows with columnar joints. Its name origin is unclear, but it may have originated from two surveyors named Jack Nelson and Bob Mollison.

Like other volcanic zones in Canada, the Garibaldi Volcanic Belt is not monitored closely enough by the Geological Survey of Canada to ascertain how active its magma system is. This is partly because several volcanoes in the chain are located in remote regions and no major eruptions have occurred in Canada in the past few hundred years. As a result, volcano monitoring is less important than dealing with other natural processes, including tsunamis, earthquakes and landslides. However, with the existence of earthquakes, further volcanism is expected and would probably have considerable effects, particularly in a region like southwestern British Columbia where the Garibaldi volcanoes are located in a highly populated area.

== Volcanic hazards ==
The volcanoes comprising the Garibaldi chain are adjacent to the highly populated southwest portion of British Columbia. Unlike the central Cascade Arc, renewed volcanic activity in the Garibaldi Belt at a single feeder to create stratovolcanoes is not typical. Instead, volcanic activity results in the formation of volcanic fields. Of the entire Cascade Arc, the Garibaldi chain has the lowest rate of volcanic activity. In the past two million years, the volume of erupted material in the Garibaldi Belt has been less than 10% of that in the U.S. states of California and Oregon and about 20% of that within the U.S. state of Washington. As a result, the risk of eruptions throughout this part of the Cascade Arc is minor. Individual volcanoes and volcanic fields remain quiet for a long period of time and certain vents may never erupt again. However, considerable volcanic activity has taken place in the geologically recent past, most notably the explosive eruption that occurred at the Mount Meager massif 2,350 years ago.

Jack Souther, a leading authority on geothermal resources and volcanism in the Canadian Cordillera has stated, "at present the volcanoes of the Garibaldi Belt are quiet, presumed dead but still not completely cold. But the flare-up of Meager Mountain 2,500 years ago raises the question, 'Could it happen again?' Was the explosive eruption of Meager Mountain the last gasp of the Garibaldi Volcanic Belt or only the most recent event in its on-going life? The short answer is nobody really knows for sure ... So just in case I sometimes do a quick check of the old hot-spots when I get off the Peak Chair ..." Recent seismic imaging from Geological Survey of Canada employees supported lithoprobe studies in the region of Mount Cayley in which scientists found a large reflector interpreted to be a pool of molten rock roughly 15 km (9.3 mi) below the surface. The existence of hot springs at the Mount Meager massif and Mount Cayley indicates that magmatic heat is still present beneath or near these volcanoes. This long history of volcanic activity along a still active plate boundary indicates that volcanic eruptions in the Garibaldi Belt have not ended and risks for future eruptions remain.

=== Tephra ===
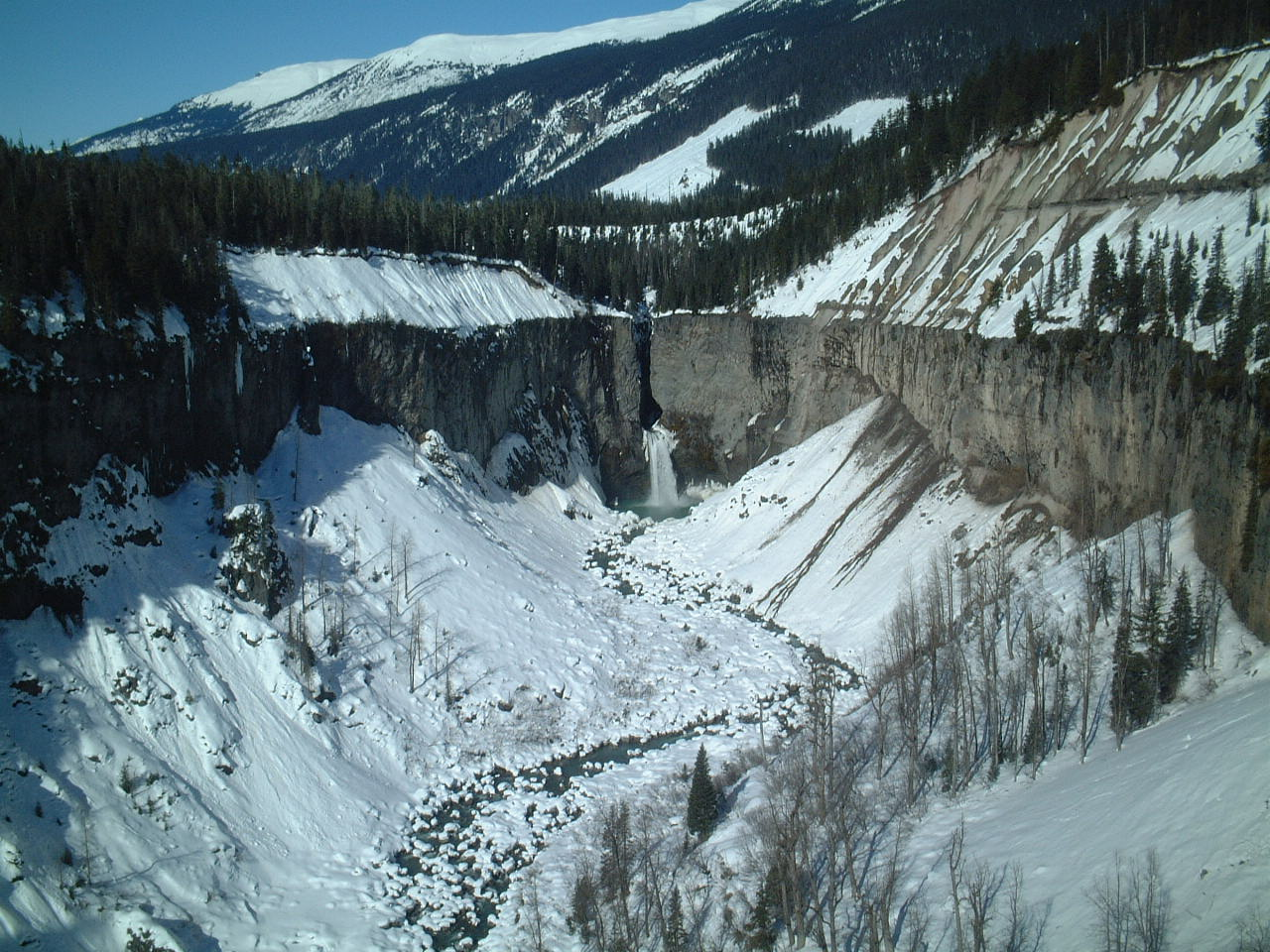
Keyhole Falls, the largest waterfall along the Lillooet River. The solid-looking rock cliffs formed when a lava flow front repeatedly collapsed and collected downslope from the vent associated with the eruption of Plinth Peak 2,350 years ago.

The largest threat from volcanoes in the Garibaldi chain would likely be due to tephra released during explosive eruptions. Mount Meager massif in particular poses a major long-distance threat to communities throughout southern British Columbia and Alberta because of its explosive history. It is estimated that over 200 eruptions have occurred throughout the entire Cascade Volcanic Arc in the past 12,000 years, many of them in the United States. Many eruptions in the western United States have sent large amounts of tephra in southern British Columbia. However, all major cities in southwestern British Columbia with populations more than 100,000 are located west of the Garibaldi Volcanic Belt and prevailing winds travel eastwards. Therefore, these communities are less likely to have large amounts of tephra. In the Lower Mainland, a 10 cm (3.9 in) thick layer of volcanic ash can deposit once every 10,000 years and 1 cm (0.39 in) once every 1,000 years. More minor amounts of volcanic ash can be expected more commonly. During Mount St. Helens' eruption in 1980, 1 mm (0.039 in) of tephra was deposited from southeastern British Columbia to Manitoba.

Even though all major cities in southwestern British Columbia are located west of the Garibaldi chain, future eruptions are expected to have significant impacts on the adjacent townships of Squamish and Whistler. An eruption column released during Peléan activity would discharge large amounts of tephra that would endanger aircraft. Tephra may also melt the large sheets of glacial ice east of Garibaldi and cause floods. This could later endanger water supplies from Pitt Lake and fisheries on the Pitt River. An explosive eruption and the associated tephra may also create temporary or longer-term water supply difficulties for Vancouver and most of southern British Columbia. The water reservoir for the Greater Vancouver drainage area is south of Mount Garibaldi.

=== Landslides and lahars ===
Several landslides and lahars have occurred throughout the Garibaldi Belt. At the Mount Meager massif, considerable landslides have occurred from Pylon Peak and Devastator Peak in the past 10,000 years that have reached more than 10 km (6.2 mi) downstream in the Lillooet River valley. At least two significant landslides from the southern flank of Pylon Peak 8,700 and 4,400 years ago dumped volcanic debris into the adjacent valley of Meager Creek. More recently, a large landslide from Devastation Glacier buried and killed a group of four geologists on July 22, 1975. The estimated volume of this landslide is 13,000,000 m^{3} (460,000,000 ft^{3}). A considerable landslide as large as Meager's largest throughout the Holocene would likely produce a lahar that would devastate most of the growth in the Lillooet River valley. If such an event would occur without it being identified by authorities who would send out a public warning, it would kill hundreds or even thousands of residents. Because of this, computer programs would be able to identify the approaching information and activate an automatic notice when a large lahar is identified. A similar system for identifying such lahars exists at Mount Rainier in the U.S. state of Washington.

Large landslides from Mount Cayley have occurred on its western flank, including a major debris avalanche about 4,800 years ago that dumped an areal extent of 8 km^{2} (3.1 mi^{2}) of volcanic material into the adjacent valley bottom. This blocked the Squamish River for a long period of time. Although there are no known eruptions from the massif in the past 10,000 years, it is associated with a group of hot springs. Evans (1990) has indicated that a number of landslides and debris flows at Mount Cayley in the past 10,000 years might have been caused by volcanic activity. Since the 4,800 BP landslide, a number of more minor landslides have occurred at it. In 1968 and 1983, a series of landslides took place that caused considerable damage to logging roads and forest stands, but did not result in any casualties.

=== Lava flows ===
The threat from lava flows in the Garibaldi Belt is minor unless an eruption takes place in winter or under or adjacent to areas of glacial ice, such as ice fields. When lava flows over large areas of snow, it creates meltwater. This can produce lahars that could flow further than the associated lavas. If water were to enter a volcanic vent that is erupting basaltic lava, it may create a massive explosive eruption. These explosions are generally more extreme than those during normal basaltic eruptions. Therefore, the existence of water, snow, or glacial ice at a volcanic vent would increase the risk of an eruption having a large impact on the surrounding region. Subglacial eruptions have also caused catastrophic glacial outburst floods.

== See also ==
- Anahim Volcanic Belt
- Geology of British Columbia
- Geology of the Pacific Northwest
- List of Cascade volcanoes
- List of volcanoes in Canada
- Milbanke Sound Group
- Northern Cordilleran Volcanic Province
- Volcanism of Canada
- Volcanism of Western Canada
- Wells Gray-Clearwater volcanic field
