= Rainbow Mountain (California) =

Stratovolcano in Siskiyou County, California, United States

- Location within California Location within the United States

Highest point
- Elevation: 7,619 ft (2,322 m)
- Coordinates: 41°28′25″N 121°57′22″W

Geography
- Location: Siskiyou County, California, U.S.
- Parent range: Cascade Range
- Topo map: USGS Rainbow Mountain

Geology
- Mountain type: Stratovolcano
- Volcanic arc: Cascade Volcanic Arc
- Last eruption: Pleistocene age

Rainbow Mountain is a stratovolcano at the southern end of the Cascade Range in Siskiyou County, California. It is located between Mount Shasta and the Medicine Lake Volcano, consisting of andesitic and dacitic rocks that were produced during the Early Pleistocene subepoch. Its last known eruption is also of Pleistocene age.

== See also ==
- List of Cascade volcanoes
