= Tuber Hill =

Volcano in British Columbia, Canada

- Location within British Columbia

Highest point
- Elevation: 2,500 m (8,200 ft)
- Coordinates: 50°54′N 123°24′W

Geography
- Location: Upper Bridge River, British Columbia, Canada
- Parent range: Pacific Ranges
- Topo map: NTS 92J14 Dickson Range

Geology
- Rock age: Pleistocene
- Mountain type: Stratovolcano
- Volcanic arc: Canadian Cascade Arc
- Volcanic belt: Garibaldi Volcanic Belt
- Volcanic field: Bridge River Cones
- Last eruption: Pleistocene

Tuber Hill is a small 600,000-year-old basaltic stratovolcano that was constructed on the Bridge River highlands when nearby valleys were packed with ice. Tuber Hill is part of the Garibaldi segment of the Canadian Cascade Arc, but is not in the geographic Cascade Range.

== See also ==
- Bridge River Cones
- Garibaldi Volcanic Belt
- Bridge River
- List of volcanoes in Canada
- Volcanism of Canada
- Volcanism of Western Canada
- Cascade Volcanic Arc
