= Castle Rocks (Oregon) =

Extinct Miocene-age volcano

Coordinates: 44°38′14″N 121°34′31″W

Highest point
- Elevation: 4,088 ft (1,246 m)

Geology
- Mountain type: Stratovolcano
- Last eruption: Miocene

Castle Rocks, located in Jefferson County, Oregon, is an extinct stratovolcano in the Cascade Range.

== Geography ==
Castle Rocks is located east of Mount Jefferson, north of Green Ridge, northeast of Black Butte, and west of Madras, Oregon.

== Geology ==
Castle Rocks is an extinct volcanic center that last erupted in the Miocene.
