= Watts Point =

Coordinates: 49.64704°N 123.22343°W

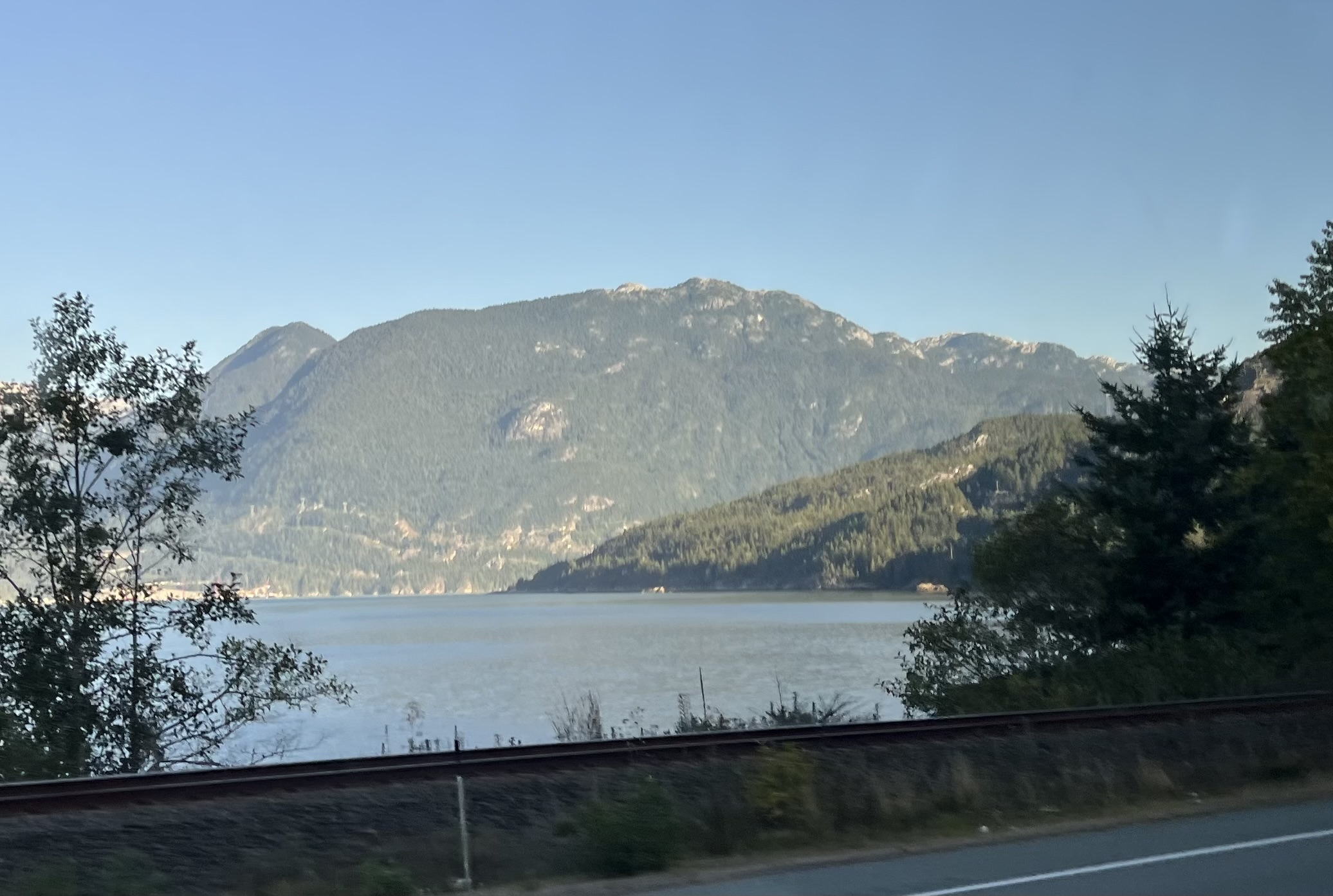
Watts Point

Watts Point is a point in southwestern British Columbia, Canada, located on the eastern side of Howe Sound northwest of Britannia Beach.

== See also ==
- Watts Point volcanic centre
