= Tumble Buttes =

Coordinates: 40°40′50″N 121°33′10″W

The Tumble Buttes are a group of cinder cone volcanoes in the US state of California.

== Geography ==
The Tumble Buttes are formed by three pyroclastic cinder cones: Bear Wallow Butte, Eiler Butte, and Hall Butte. They range in elevation from 6,391 feet (1,948 m) to 7,188 feet (2,191 m). The volcanoes trend north-northwest to south-southeast along a fissure. Eiler Butte marks the northern end, while Bear Wallow Butte is the southernmost cone. Eiler Butte is small with a flat top; it lies within the Thousand Lake Wilderness Area.

== Geology ==
The Tumble Buttes form part of the volcanic region near Lassen Volcanic Center, characterized by calc-alkaline eruptions over the last 3 million years. Eruptive activity has largely consisted of shield volcanoes, lava cones, and cinder cones, the products of which to the north of Lassen are bounded by faults. The Tumble Buttes represent one focus of volcanic activity that started about 75,000 years ago and concurrently produced the Sugarloaf chain.

Tumble Buttes consists of a chain of 13 monogenetic cinder cones with lava flows and volcanic cones. It runs for about 9.3 miles (15 km) in length and trends north–west 15 degrees; the linear structure parallel to regional fault zones likely reflects a single common fault that funneled magma to each of the cones. Eruptive material consists of olivine as well as pyroxene basaltic andesite and andesite. Units of erupted material in the chain range from 10,000 to 75,000 years old and exhibit similar lithology and composition.

Bear Wallow Butte has unvegetated lava flows on both its eastern and western flanks; Eiler Butte has produced blocky lava.

== Eruptive history ==
The Tumble Buttes last erupted between 10,000 and 15,000 years ago, making them either Pleistocene or Holocene in age. The cinder cones have erupted lava flows. According to the Global Volcanism Program, the Tumble Buttes mark some of the most recent volcanic activity north of the Mount Lassen area.

== Sources ==
- Clynne, Mike; Muffler, Patrick (2010). Geologic Map of Lassen Volcanic National Park and Vicinity, California. Reston, Virginia: United States Geological Survey.
