= Watts Point volcanic centre =

Volcano in British Columbia, Canada

- Location within British Columbia

Highest point
- Elevation: ~ 240 m (800 ft)
- Coordinates: 49°39′10″N 123°12′30″W

Geography
- Location: British Columbia, Canada
- Parent range: Britannia Range (North Shore Mountains)
- Topo map: NTS 92G11 Squamish

Geology
- Formed by: Subduction zone volcanism
- Rock age: ~ 90,000–130,000 years
- Mountain type: Subglacial mound
- Volcanic arc: Canadian Cascade Arc
- Volcanic belt: Garibaldi Volcanic Belt
- Volcanic field: Squamish volcanic field
- Last eruption: ~ 90,000 years

The Watts Point volcanic centre is a small outcrop of Pleistocene age volcanic rock at Watts Point in British Columbia, Canada, about 10 kilometres (6 mi) south of Squamish and 40 kilometres (25 mi) north of Vancouver, and just north of Britannia Beach. It is the southernmost volcanic zone in the Squamish volcanic field and of the Garibaldi segment of the Cascade Volcanic Arc. The latest research indicates that it is most likely a subglacial mound. It comprises a continuous mass of sparsely porphyritic highly jointed dacitic lava overlying the mid-Cretaceous Coast Plutonic Complex and overlain locally by clay and of glacial till.

The volcanic outcrop at Watts Point extends from below the present sea level up the side of a steep slope over 240 metres (800 ft). The outcrop is less than 1 kilometre (0.6 mi) long, with an area of about 0.4 square kilometres (0.2 sq mi) and an eruptive volume of roughly 0.02 cubic kilometres (0.0048 cu mi). The location is heavily forested, and the BC Rail mainline passes through the lower portion of the outcrop about 40 m (130 ft) above sea level. Two railroad track ballast quarries, one near the middle and the other near the upper edge, provide the best exposure of the interior of the lava mass. BC Highway 99 climbs over the eastern shoulder of the complex before descending to the area of the Stawamus Chief and Murrin Park, south southeast of Squamish.

== See also ==
- Cascade Volcanoes
- Garibaldi Volcanic Belt
- Volcanism of Canada
- Volcanism of Western Canada
- List of volcanoes in Canada
- Geology of the Pacific Northwest
