= Shovelnose Creek =

Creek in British Columbia, Canada

Coordinates: 50°04′06″N 123°20′36″W

Shovelnose Creek is a creek in the Pacific Ranges of the Coast Mountains in southwestern British Columbia, Canada. It flows southwest into the Squamish River and south of the Elaho River.

The location was used in the filming of the film Revenant, for a scene where an attempt is made by fur trappers to carry frontiersman Glass over a sandbank.
