= Yn tephra =

Tephra deposit in Washington, United States

Yn tephra eruption
- Volcano: Mount St. Helens
- Date: 1860 BCE (?)
- Type: Plinian
- Location: Washington, United States; 46°11′28″N 122°11′40″W
- VEI: 6

The Yn tephra is a geologically recent tephra deposit that covers portions of the U.S. state of Washington and the Canadian provinces of British Columbia and Alberta. It was created by the largest known volcanic eruption from Mount St. Helens, having taken place in possibly 1860 BCE as part of the Smith Creek eruptive period. The tephra consists of pumiceous dacite.
