= Keyhole Falls =

Waterfall on the Lillooet River in British Columbia, Canada

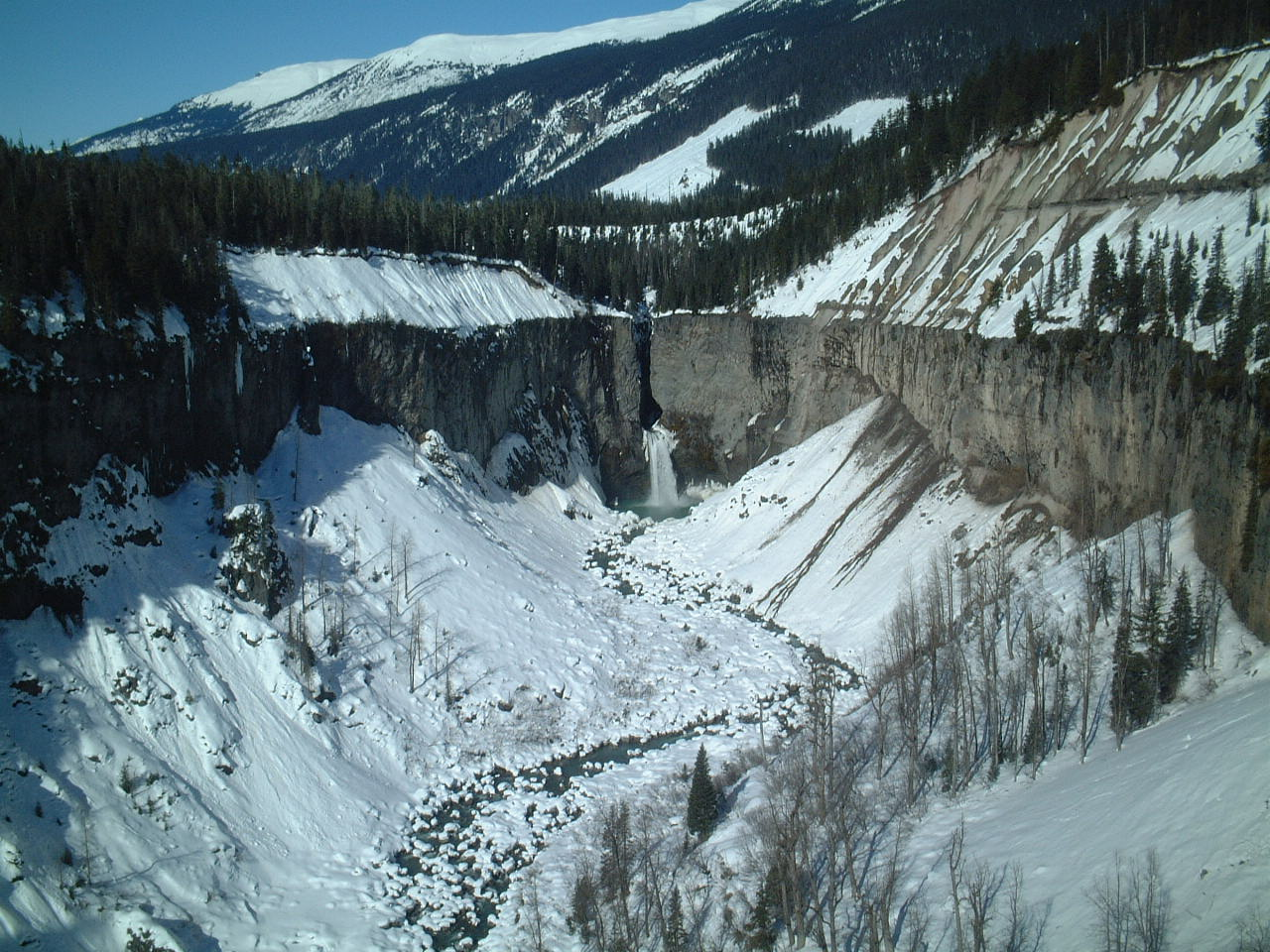
- Interactive map of Keyhole Falls
- Location: Near the mouth of Salal Creek
- Coordinates: 50°40′34″N 123°28′18″W
- Type: Plunging Punchbowl
- Total height: 37 metres (121 ft)
- Number of drops: 1
- Longest drop: 37 metres (121 ft)
- Total width: 30 metres (98 ft)
- Average width: 15 metres (49 ft)
- Run: 6 metres (20 ft)
- Watercourse: Lillooet River
- Average flow rate: 48 m^{3}/s (1,700 cu ft/s)

Keyhole Falls is the unofficial name for the largest waterfall along the Lillooet River in British Columbia, Canada. The falls are 115 feet (35 m) high and are a punchbowl type of waterfall.

It is called Keyhole Falls because it resembles a giant old-fashioned keyhole.

== Formation ==
Keyhole Falls was formed when the Lillooet River was dammed with breccia from a Plinian eruption at the Mount Meager massif about 2350 years ago. The thick breccia soon eroded from water activity, forming Keyhole Falls. There was a massive flood when the water first broke through the breccia. The flood was big enough that small house-sized blocks of breccia were carried away during the flood.

== Access ==
There are no developed trails leading to any clear view of the falls. Due to how undercut the cliff is, one cannot see the falls by looking down into the canyon from the cliff's edge.

== See also ==
- List of waterfalls
- List of waterfalls of Canada
- List of waterfalls in British Columbia
