= Bridge River Cones =

Volcanic field in Canada

Highest point
- Elevation: 2,500 m (8,200 ft)
- Coordinates: 50°51′30″N 123°24′00″W

Geography
- Location: Upper Bridge River, British Columbia, Canada
- Parent range: Pacific Ranges

Geology
- Rock age: Holocene
- Mountain type: Volcanic field
- Volcanic arc: Canadian Cascade Arc
- Volcanic belt: Garibaldi Volcanic Belt
- Last eruption: Unknown, possibly after 500 CE

The Bridge River Cones, sometimes referred to as the Lillooet Cones and Salal Creek Cones, is the name given to a volcanic field located on the north flank of the upper Bridge River, about 40 km (25 mi) west of the town of Gold Bridge. The cones are in the lee of the Lillooet Icecap and sit astride a group of passes between the Bridge River, which flows W-E to their south, and the Lord River, which flows north to the Taseko Lakes in the Chilcotin District.

== Geology ==
The Bridge River Cones consist of small trachybasaltic and basaltic eruptive centers. Sham Hill (50.90°N 123.51°W), a 60 m (197 ft) high steep-sided volcanic plug, is the oldest volcano in the field with a potassium-argon date of one million years. The plug is approximately 300 m (984 ft) wide and its bare glaciated surface, strewn with glacial erratics, consists of large subhorizontal columns formed within the central conduit of an eroded stratovolcano.

The Salal Glacier volcanic complex (50.79°N 123.38°W), with a potassium-argon date of 0.97 to 0.59 million years, contains subaerial tephra and thin scoriaceous flows in the upper part of the pile are surrounded by ice-ponded flows up to 100 m (328 ft) thick.

Tuber Hill (50.93°N 123.44°W), a small basaltic stratovolcano with a potassium-argon date of 0.6 million years, was constructed on the Bridge River upland when neighboring valleys were filled by ice. Where distal flows violated on the glaciers a marginal meltwater lake was created in which less than 150 m (492 ft) of interbedded hyaloclastite, debris flows, and lacustrine tuff were deposited.

The youngest volcanic rocks in the Bridge River volcanic field lie east of Tuber Hill and are remnants of valley-filling basalt flows. The age of these valley-filling basalt flows is unknown but the presence of unconsolidated glacial until under the flows suggest they are less than 1,500 years old.

== See also ==
Map of the Garibaldi Volcanic Belt volcanoes, including the Bridge River Cones area.

- Bridge River Power Project
- Bridge River, British Columbia
- Bridge River Indian Band
- Bridge River Canyon
- Bridge River Country
- Garibaldi Volcanic Belt
- Cascade Volcanoes
- Cascade Range
- Spruce Lake Protected Area
- Tsʼilʔos Provincial Park
- Lillooet Icecap
- List of volcanoes in Canada
- List of volcanic fields
- Volcanism of Canada
- Volcanism of Western Canada
