= Lava spine =

Vertical growth of solid volcanic lava

A lava spine (or lava spire) is a vertical growth of solid lava that is forced from a volcanic vent. A lava spine can either be formed by viscous lava slowly being pushed out of the vent, or by magma that has solidified within the vent before being pushed out.

In February 1983, the dome activity of Mount St. Helens culminated in a spine that reached a height of about 30 metres (100 ft) before collapsing after two weeks, but in 2005 another lava spine (called the Whaleback) lasted until it collapsed in July 2005. In November 2005, a new spine, called "the slab" grew continuously until late 2006, though it continually collapsed under its own weight; the growth finally stopped in January 2008, when Mount St. Helens' eruption ended. Another example is a spine that appeared on the lava dome of the Soufrière Hills Volcano in Montserrat prior to the volcano's eruption in 1997.

== Gallery ==
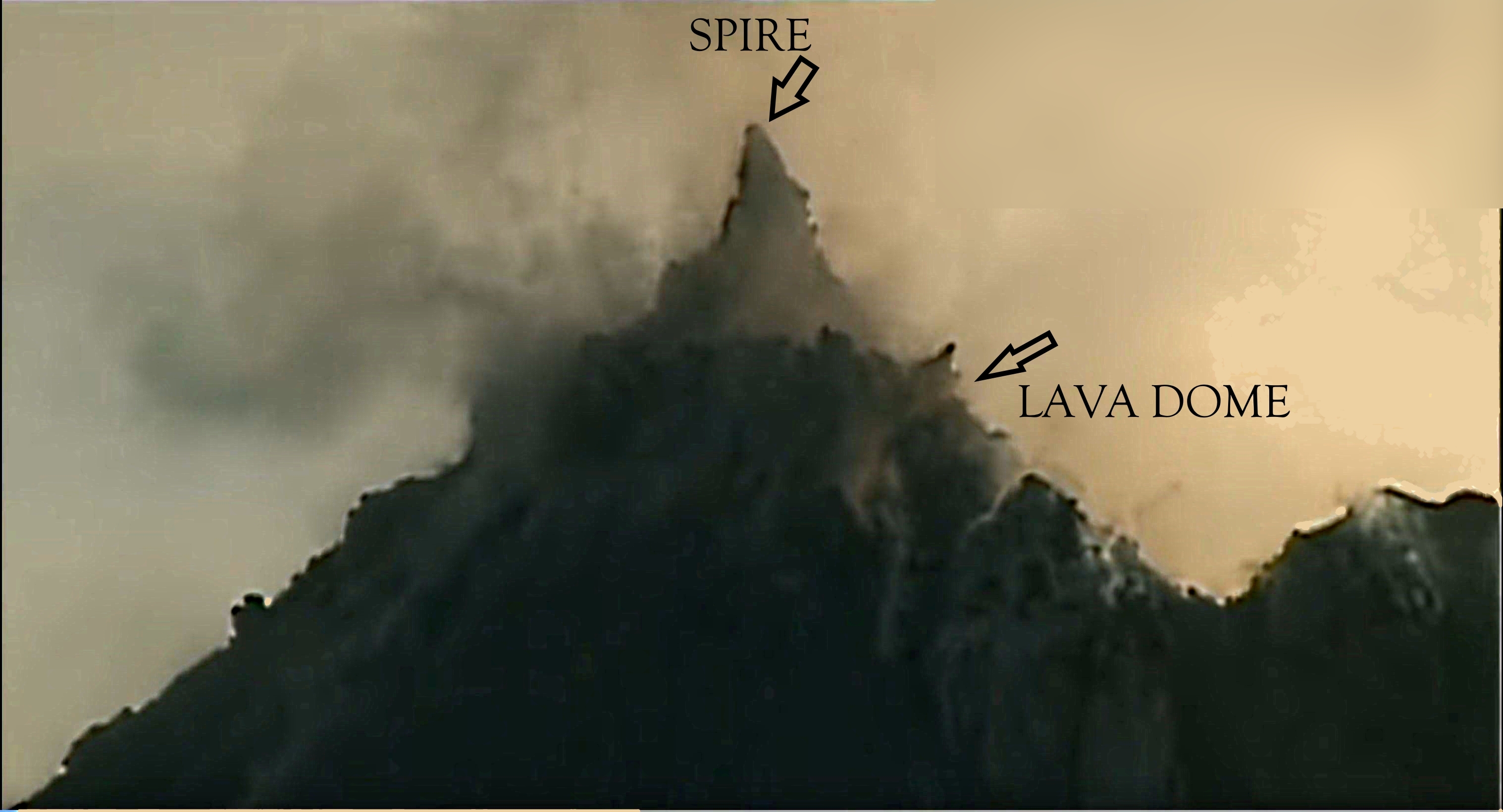
A spire of lava on top of the lava dome of Soufrière Hills volcano

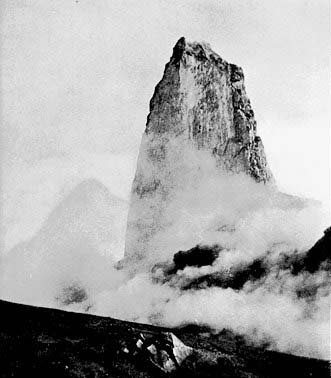
A lava spine at the summit of Mount Pelée in 1902

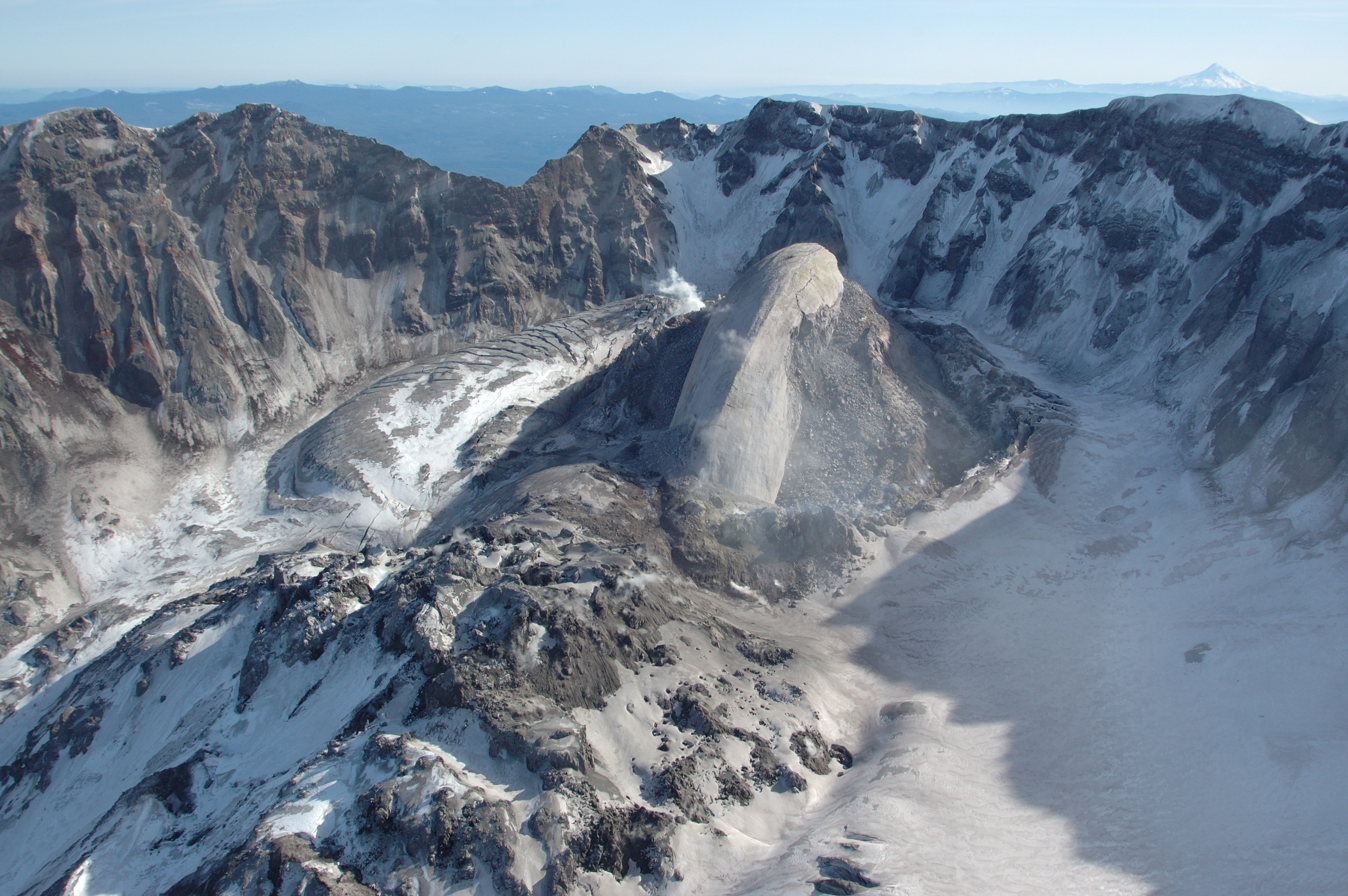
"Whaleback", Mount St. Helens

== See also ==
- Volcanic plug
