= Wedge (disambiguation) =

A wedge is a triangular-shaped simple machine.

Wedge, The Wedge, or Wedges may also refer to:

== Common meanings ==
- Wedge (footwear), a type of shoe
- Wedge (golf), a type of golf club

== Clothing ==
- Wedge cap, a foldable air force cap (Canadian term)

== Culture ==
=== Fictional characters ===
- Wedge (Transformers), an Autobot, leader of the Build Team in the "Transformers: Robots in Disguise" toy line
- Wedge Antilles, a character in the Star Wars films
- Wedge, a recurring character in the Final Fantasy video game series; see Biggs and Wedge

=== Music ===
- The Wedge (album), by the British band Pallas
- "The Wedge" (song), by American band Phish, 1993
- Prelude and Fugue in E minor, BWV 548, a work by Johann Sebastian Bach sometimes called "The Wedge"
- Wedge Records, a record label

=== Television ===
- The Wedge (Australian TV series), a sketch show on Network Ten
- The Wedge (Canadian TV series), a music show on MuchMusic

=== Publications ===
- The Wedge (poetry collection), 1944 collection of poems by William Carlos Williams
- Wedge: The Secret War Between the FBI and CIA, 1994 book by Mark Riebling

== Linguistics ==
- Wedge (phonetics), the International Phonetic Alphabet symbol ʌ
- Caron, háček or wedge, a diacritic symbol

== Mathematics ==
- Wedge (geometry), a polyhedral solid
- Wedge (symbol) ($\land$), a symbol which is interpreted as logical conjunction ("and")
- Wedge product, the exterior product of vectors
- Wedge sum, an operation on topological spaces

== People ==
- Wedge (surname), a list of people with the surname
- Nickname of Warren Grimm (1888–1919), American Legion Post Commander killed in the Centralia massacre

== Places ==
=== United States ===
- Wedge International Tower, in Houston, Texas
- The Wedge (surfing), a surf spot in Newport Beach, California
- Wedges Creek, Wisconsin
- Wedge Plantation, South Carolina
- Lowry Hill East, Minneapolis, a neighborhood nicknamed "the Wedge" in Minnesota
- Wedge (border), a small area of Delaware that was disputed between Maryland, Pennsylvania, and Delaware until 1921
- Farmers and Merchants Bank Building (Monroe City, Missouri), also known as "The Wedge"

=== Antarctica ===
- Wedge Face, on the Shackleton Coast
- Wedge Ridge, in Coats Land

=== Elsewhere ===
- Wedge Island (disambiguation), various islands (also a settlement and a locality) in Australia and Canada
- Wedge Mountain, in British Columbia, Canada
- The Wedge (Alberta), a mountain in the Fisher Range of the Canadian Rockies

== Geographical features ==
- The Wedge (Alaska), a mountain near Anchorage
- The Wedge (Montana), a mountain range
- Wedge Peak (Alaska)
- Wedge Pass

== Food ==
- Submarine sandwich
- Potato wedges, a large cut of potatoes baked or fried and eaten as a side dish

== Companies ==
- Wedge Community Co-op, a grocery in Minneapolis, Minnesota, United States
- Wedge Group, a British galvanising company

== Other uses ==
- Flying wedge, a troop formation
- The Wedge, the narrowest house in Britain, located on the island of Great Cumbrae
- DOS Wedge, a piece of software for the Commodore 64 computer
- Monitor wedge, a type of loudspeaker
- TVR Wedges, a series of sports cars
- The wedge, a weather phenomenon resulting from cold air damming
- Wedge issue or wedge politics, divisive political or social issue
- Wedge strategy, a creationist political and social action plan
- Wedge snowplow, a rail snowplow made for the American West

== See also ==
- Wedgie
- Wedge-tailed eagle, known in Australian English as a "wedgie"
