= Mount Cook (British Columbia) =

Mountain in the country of Canada

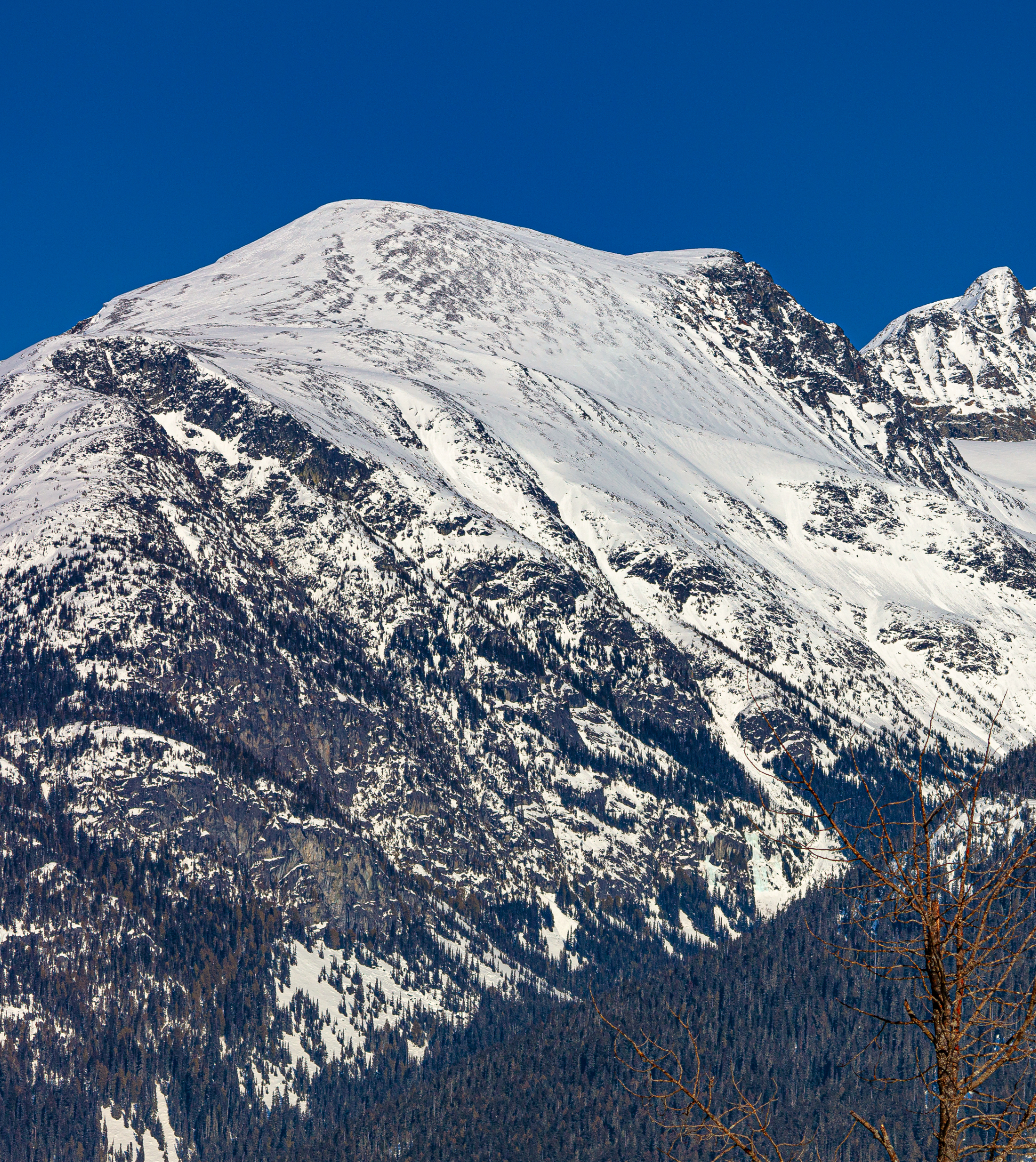
- Mount Cook seen from Highway 99

Highest point
- Elevation: 2,676 m (8,780 ft)
- Prominence: 66 m (217 ft)
- Parent peak: Mount Weart (2835 m)
- Listing: Mountains of British Columbia
- Coordinates: 50°10′25″N 122°48′01″W

Geography
- Location within British Columbia Location within Canada
- Interactive map of Mount Cook
- Location: Garibaldi Provincial Park; British Columbia, Canada
- District: New Westminster Land District
- Parent range: Garibaldi Ranges; Coast Ranges
- Topo map: NTS 92J2 Whistler

Climbing
- Easiest route: Scramble via west ridge

Mount Cook is a 2,676-metre (8,780-foot) mountain located in the Garibaldi Ranges of the Coast Mountains, in northwestern Garibaldi Provincial Park of southwestern British Columbia, Canada. It is situated above the north shore of Wedgemount Lake, 13 km (8 mi) northeast of Whistler, and its nearest higher peak is Mount Weart, 1.2 km (1 mi) to the southeast. The Armchair Glacier is set between Cook and Weart, and the Weart Glacier rests on the northern slope of Cook. Precipitation runoff from the peak and meltwater from the glaciers drains into Wedgemount Lake and Green River.

The mountain was known as Miniweart and North Wedge before the Cook name was submitted June 1977 by mountaineers Neal Carter and Karl Ricker of the Alpine Club of Canada. The mountain's name was officially adopted March 9, 1979, by the Geographical Names Board of Canada.

== Climate ==
Based on the Köppen climate classification, Mount Cook is located in the marine west coast climate zone of western North America. Most weather fronts originate in the Pacific Ocean, and travel east toward the Coast Mountains where they are forced upward by the range (Orographic lift), causing them to drop their moisture in the form of rain or snowfall. As a result, the Coast Mountains experience high precipitation, especially during the winter months in the form of snowfall. Temperatures can drop below −20 °C with wind chill factors below −30 °C. The months July through September offer the most favorable weather for climbing Cook.

== Climbing Routes ==
Established rock climbing routes on Mount Cook:

- West Ridge - class 2
- East Ridge - class 3

== See also ==
- Geography of British Columbia
- Geology of British Columbia
