= Rethel Mountain =

Mountain in British Columbia, Canada

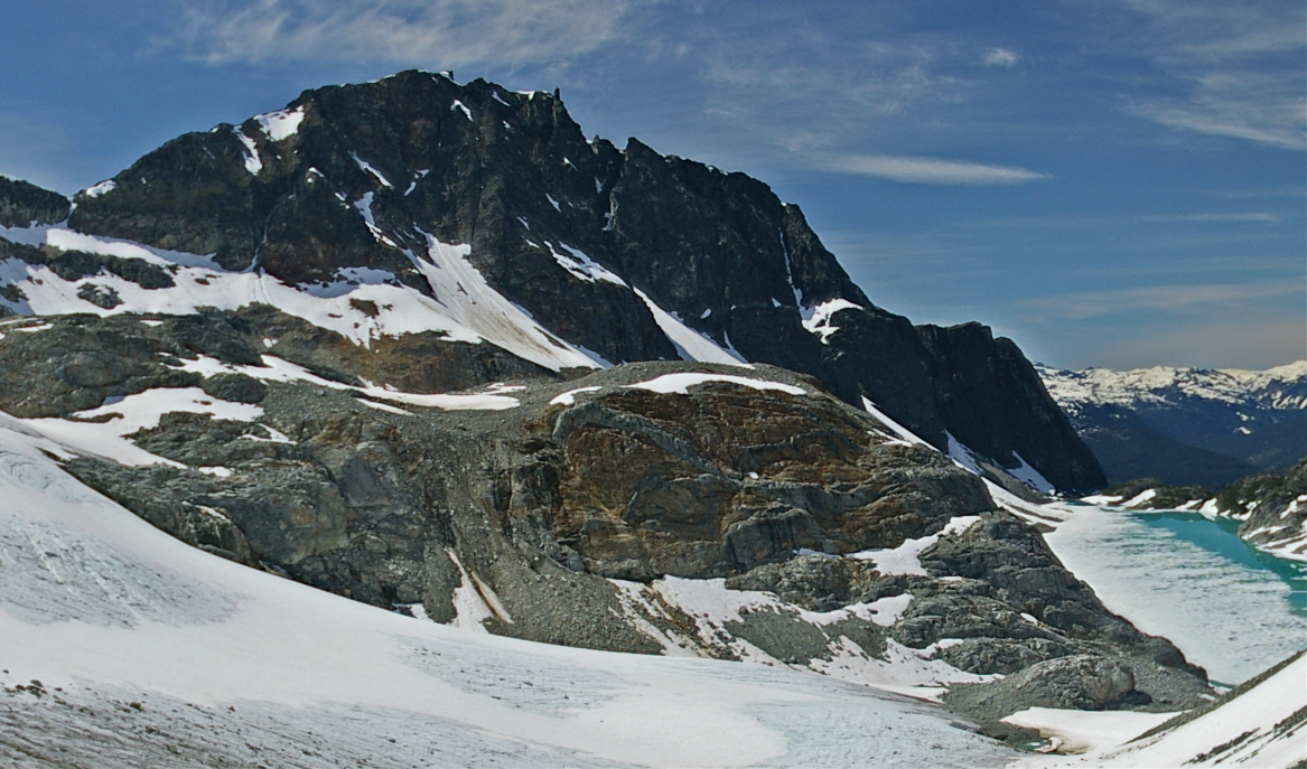
- Rethel Mountain, east aspect

Highest point
- Elevation: 2,408 m (7,900 ft)
- Prominence: 178 m (584 ft)
- Parent peak: Parkhurst Mountain (2494 m)
- Listing: Mountains of British Columbia
- Coordinates: 50°09′15″N 122°49′23″W

Geography
- Location within British Columbia Location within Canada
- Interactive map of Rethel Mountain
- Location: Garibaldi Provincial Park; British Columbia, Canada
- District: New Westminster Land District
- Parent range: Garibaldi Ranges; Coast Ranges
- Topo map: NTS 92J2 Whistler

Geology
- Rock type: Granite

Climbing
- Easiest route: Scramble

Rethel Mountain is a 2,408-metre (7,900-foot) mountain summit located in the Garibaldi Ranges of the Coast Mountains, in northwestern Garibaldi Provincial Park of southwestern British Columbia, Canada. It is situated 11 km (7 mi) northeast of Whistler, on the south side of Wedgemount Lake and west side of Wedgemount Glacier. Its nearest higher peak is Parkhurst Mountain, 1.3 km (1 mi) to the southeast. Rethel is set 3.2 km (2 mi) northwest of Wedge Mountain, the highest peak in Garibaldi Park, and 2.9 km (2 mi) southwest of Mount Weart, the second-highest in the park. Precipitation runoff from the peak drains into Wedgemount Creek and Rethel Creek, both tributaries of the Green River, which in turn is a tributary of the Lillooet River. It was named in association from Rethel station (since closed) on the Pacific Great Eastern Railway route. The mountain's name was officially adopted on February 27, 1978, by the Geographical Names Board of Canada.

== Climate ==
Based on the Köppen climate classification, Rethel Mountain is located in the marine west coast climate zone of western North America. Most weather fronts originate in the Pacific Ocean, and travel east toward the Coast Mountains where they are forced upward by the range (Orographic lift), causing them to drop their moisture in the form of rain or snowfall. As a result, the Coast Mountains experience high precipitation, especially during the winter months in the form of snowfall. Winter temperatures can drop below −20 °C with wind chill factors below −30 °C. The months July through September offer the most favorable weather for climbing Rethel Mountain.

== Gallery ==
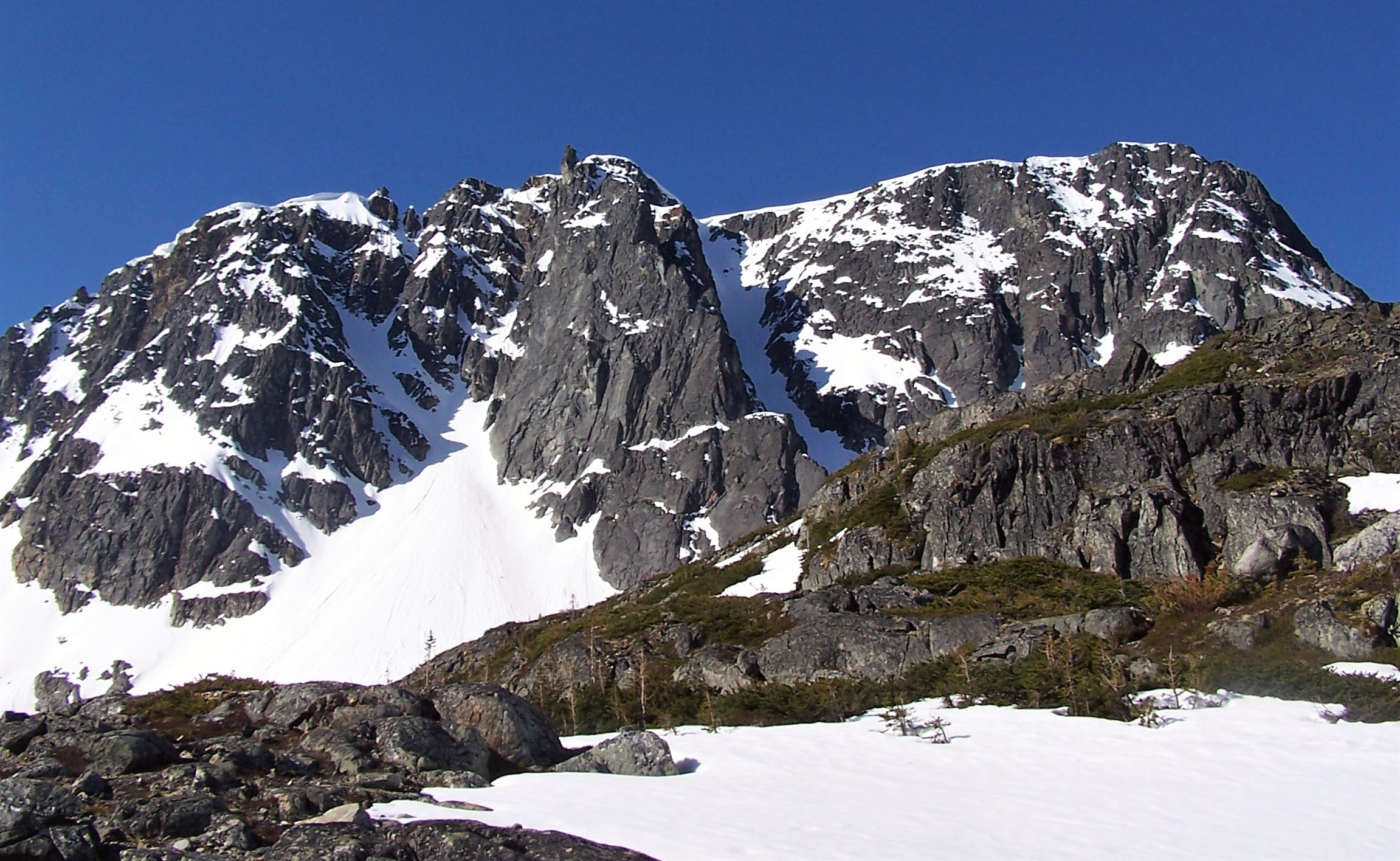
Rethel Mountain, north aspect

== See also ==
- Geography of British Columbia
- Geology of British Columbia
