= Parkhurst Mountain =

Mountain in British Columbia, Canada

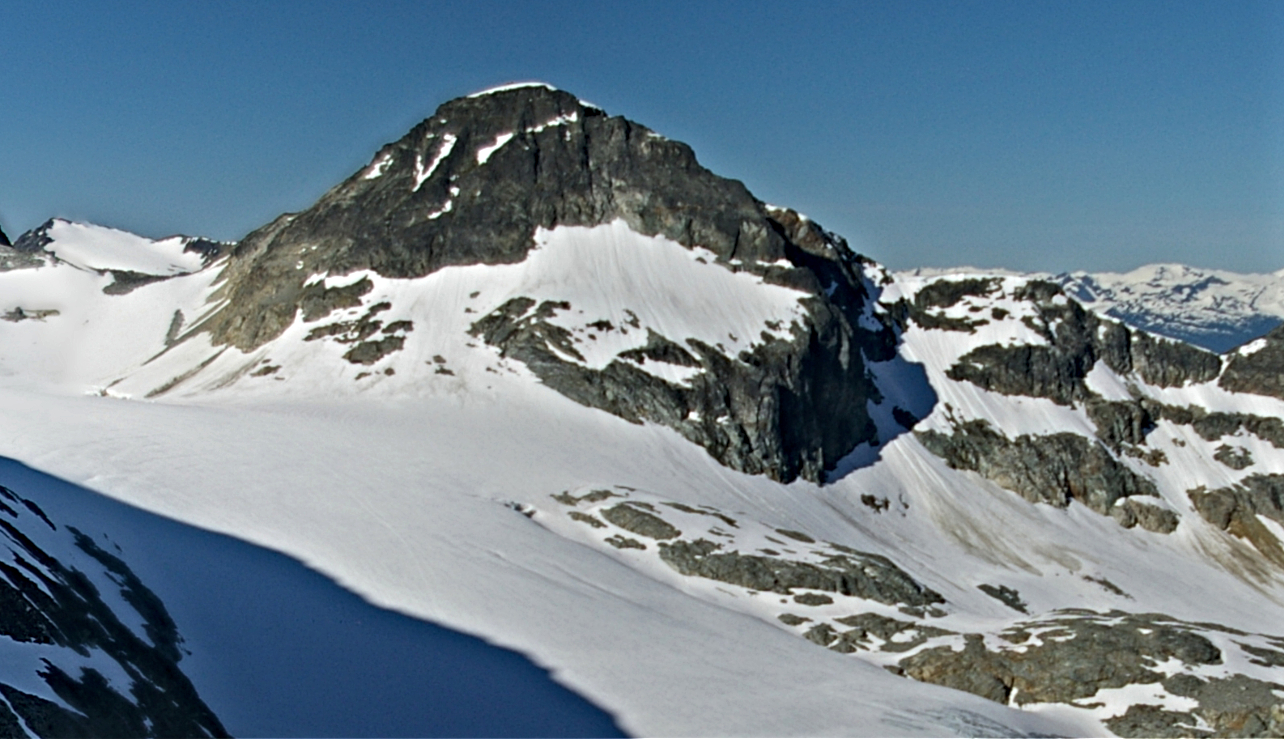
- Parkhurst Mountain, east aspect

Highest point
- Elevation: 2,494 m (8,182 ft)
- Prominence: 184 m (604 ft)
- Parent peak: Wedge Mountain (2892 m)
- Listing: Mountains of British Columbia
- Coordinates: 50°08′48″N 122°48′26″W

Geography
- Location within British Columbia Location within Canada
- Interactive map of Parkhurst Mountain
- Country: Canada
- Province: British Columbia
- District: New Westminster Land District
- Protected area: Garibaldi Provincial Park
- Parent range: Garibaldi Ranges; Coast Ranges
- Topo map: NTS 92J2 Whistler

Geology
- Rock type: Granite

Climbing
- Easiest route: Scramble South slopes

Parkhurst Mountain is a 2,494-metre (8,182-foot) mountain summit located in the Garibaldi Ranges of the Coast Mountains, in northwestern Garibaldi Provincial Park of southwestern British Columbia, Canada. It is situated 11 km (7 mi) east-northeast of Whistler, south of Wedgemount Lake, and on the west side of Wedgemount Glacier. Parkhurst's nearest neighbor is Rethel Mountain, 0.89 km (1 mi) to the northwest, and its nearest higher peak (and also the highest peak in Garibaldi Park) is Wedge Mountain, 1.8 km (1 mi) to the southeast. Mount Weart, the second-highest peak in the park, rises 2.6 km (2 mi) northeast of Parkhurst. Precipitation runoff from the peak drains into Wedge Creek, Wedgemount Creek, and Rethel Creek, which are all tributaries of the Green River, which in turn is a tributary of the Lillooet River. The present day ghost town of Parkhurst was an old logging town in the 1920s and 1930s set on the edge of Green Lake, 9 km (6 mi) west of Parkhurst Mountain. The site was named for Mr. and Mrs. Parkhurst who preempted the land on Green Lake in 1902 and built a small house where they lived with their family. The mountain's name was officially adopted on June 25, 1975, by the Geographical Names Board of Canada.

== Climate ==
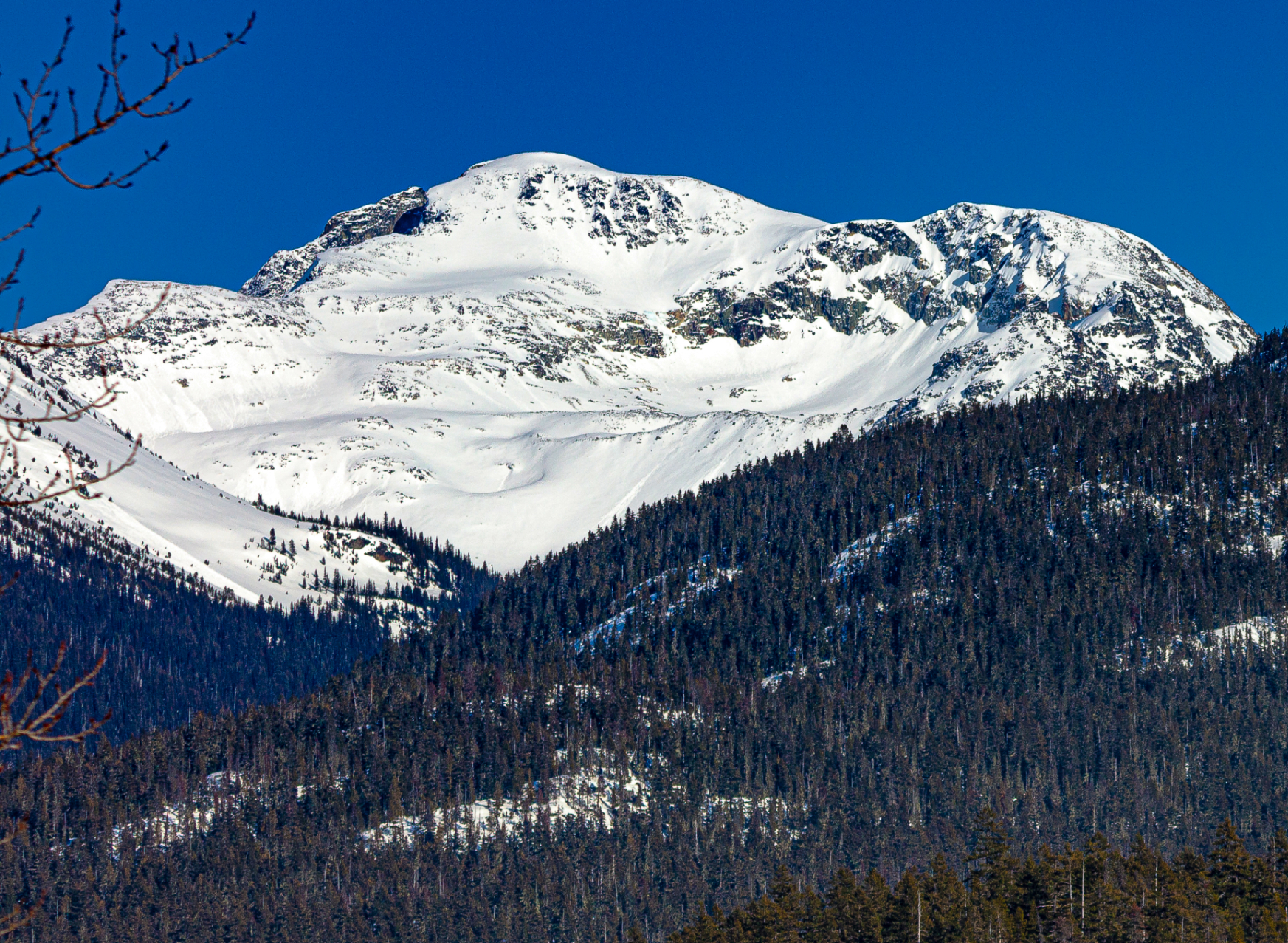
Parkhurst Mountain from Hwy 99

Based on the Köppen climate classification, Parkhurst Mountain is located in the marine west coast climate zone of western North America. Most weather fronts originate in the Pacific Ocean, and travel east toward the Coast Mountains where they are forced upward by the range (Orographic lift), causing them to drop their moisture in the form of rain or snowfall. As a result, the Coast Mountains experience high precipitation, especially during the winter months in the form of snowfall. Temperatures can drop below −20 °C with wind chill factors below −30 °C. The months July through September offer the most favorable weather for climbing Parkhurst Mountain.

== See also ==
- Geography of British Columbia
- Geology of British Columbia
