= Mount James Turner =

Mountain summit in British Columbia, Canada

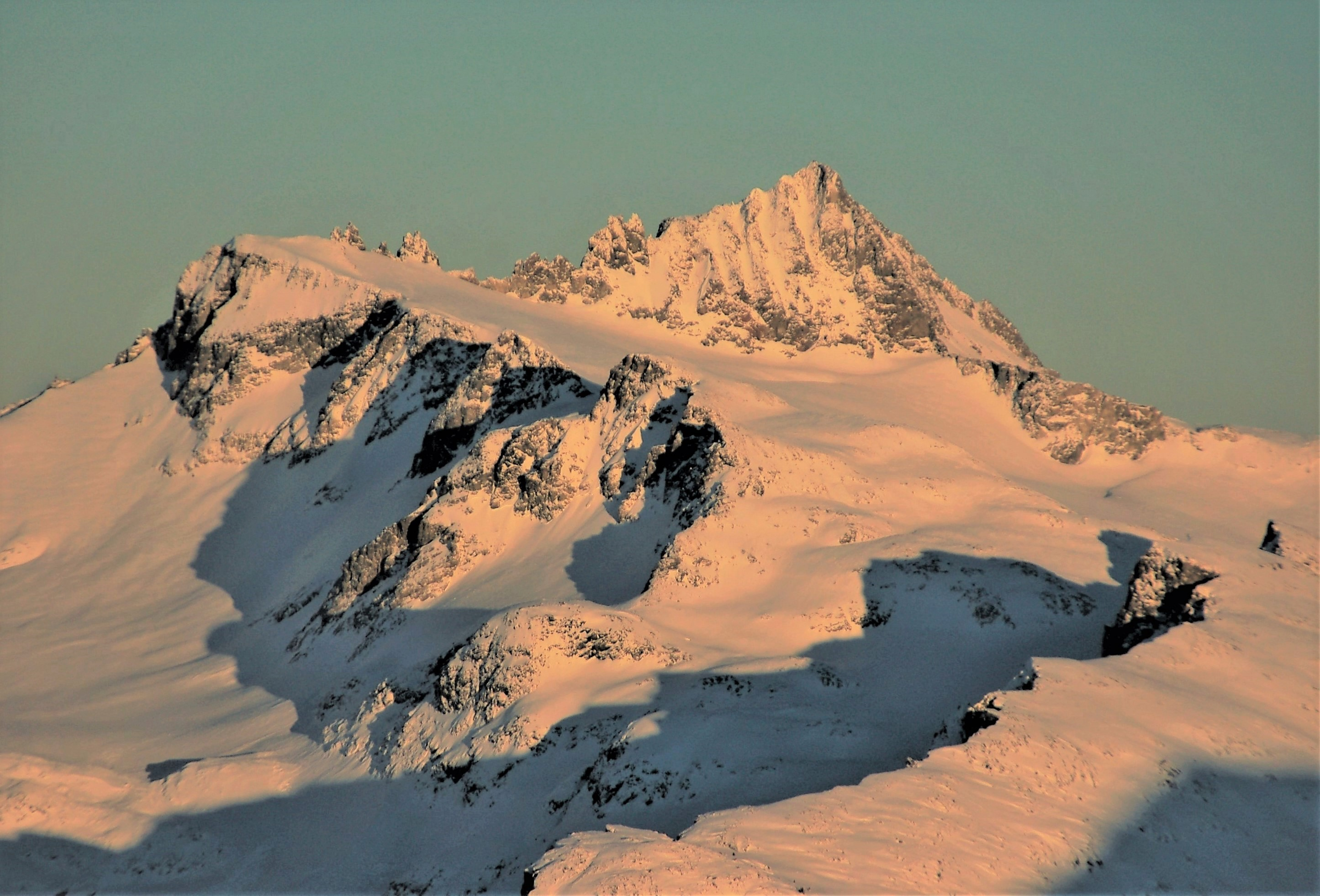
- West aspect

Highest point
- Elevation: 2,703 m (8,868 ft)
- Prominence: 402 m (1,319 ft)
- Parent peak: Wedge Mountain (2,895 m)
- Isolation: 4.5 km (2.8 mi)
- Listing: Mountains of British Columbia
- Coordinates: 50°07′00″N 122°43′21″W

Geography
- Location within British Columbia Location within Canada
- Interactive map of Mount James Turner
- Country: Canada
- Province: British Columbia
- District: New Westminster Land District
- Protected area: Garibaldi Provincial Park
- Parent range: Garibaldi Ranges; Coast Mountains
- Topo map: NTS 92J2 Whistler

Climbing
- First ascent: 1923 by Neal Carter

Mount James Turner is a 2,703-metre (8,868-foot) mountain summit located in British Columbia, Canada.

== Description ==
Mount James Turner is the fourth-highest peak within Garibaldi Provincial Park. It is part of the Garibaldi Ranges of the Coast Mountains. It is situated 16 km (10 mi) east of Whistler, 5.4 km (3 mi) southeast of Wedge Mountain and 9 km (6 mi) northeast of Tremor Mountain. Precipitation runoff from the peak drains to Billygoat and Chaos creeks which are tributaries of the Lillooet River. Topographic relief is significant as the summit rises over 1,700 meters (5,577 feet) above Billygoat Creek in approximately three kilometers (1.9 mile).

== History ==
The first ascent of Mt. James Turner was made September 12, 1923, by Neal Carter and Charles Townsend. This was two days after they made the first ascent of Wedge Mountain.

The mountain was named by Neal Carter in memory of Rev. James Turner, a pioneer Methodist minister and outstanding figure well known in British Columbia and Yukon who died in 1923.

The name "Mount James Turner" was recommended by the Garibaldi Park Board, and the toponym was officially adopted September 2, 1930, by the Geographical Names Board of Canada.

== Climate ==
Based on the Köppen climate classification, Mount James Turner is located in the marine west coast climate zone of western North Americ. Most weather fronts originate in the Pacific Ocean, and travel east toward the Coast Mountains where they are forced upward by the range (orographic lift), causing them to drop their moisture in the form of rain or snowfall. As a result, the Coast Mountains experience high precipitation, especially during the winter months in the form of snowfall. Winter temperatures can drop below −20 °C with wind chill factors below −30 °C. This climate supports the Turner, Berna, and Chaos glaciers surrounding the slopes of this mountain.

== Gallery ==
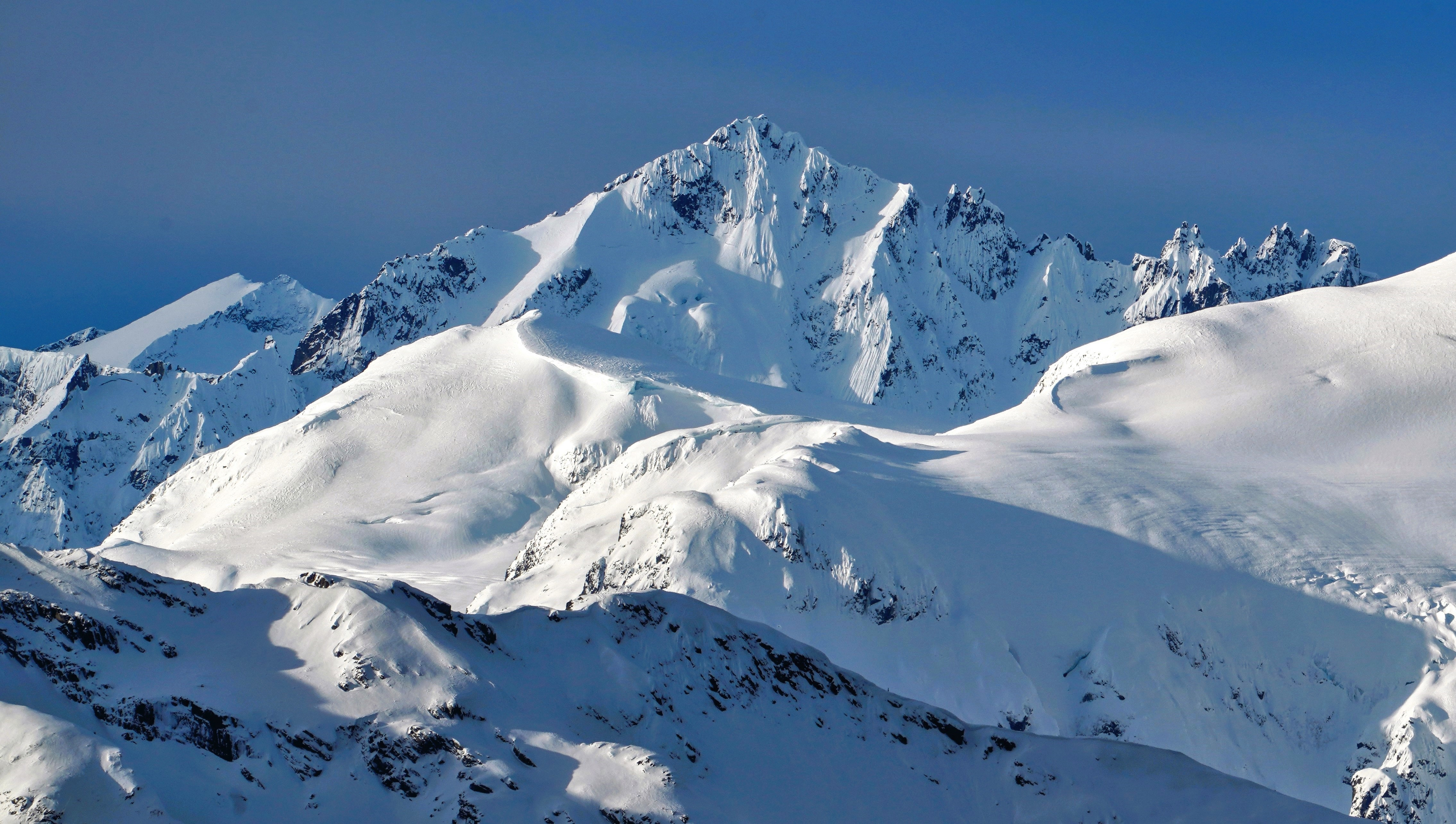
Northeast aspect in winter

== See also ==
- Geography of British Columbia
