= Mount Neal =

Mountain in British Columbia, Canada

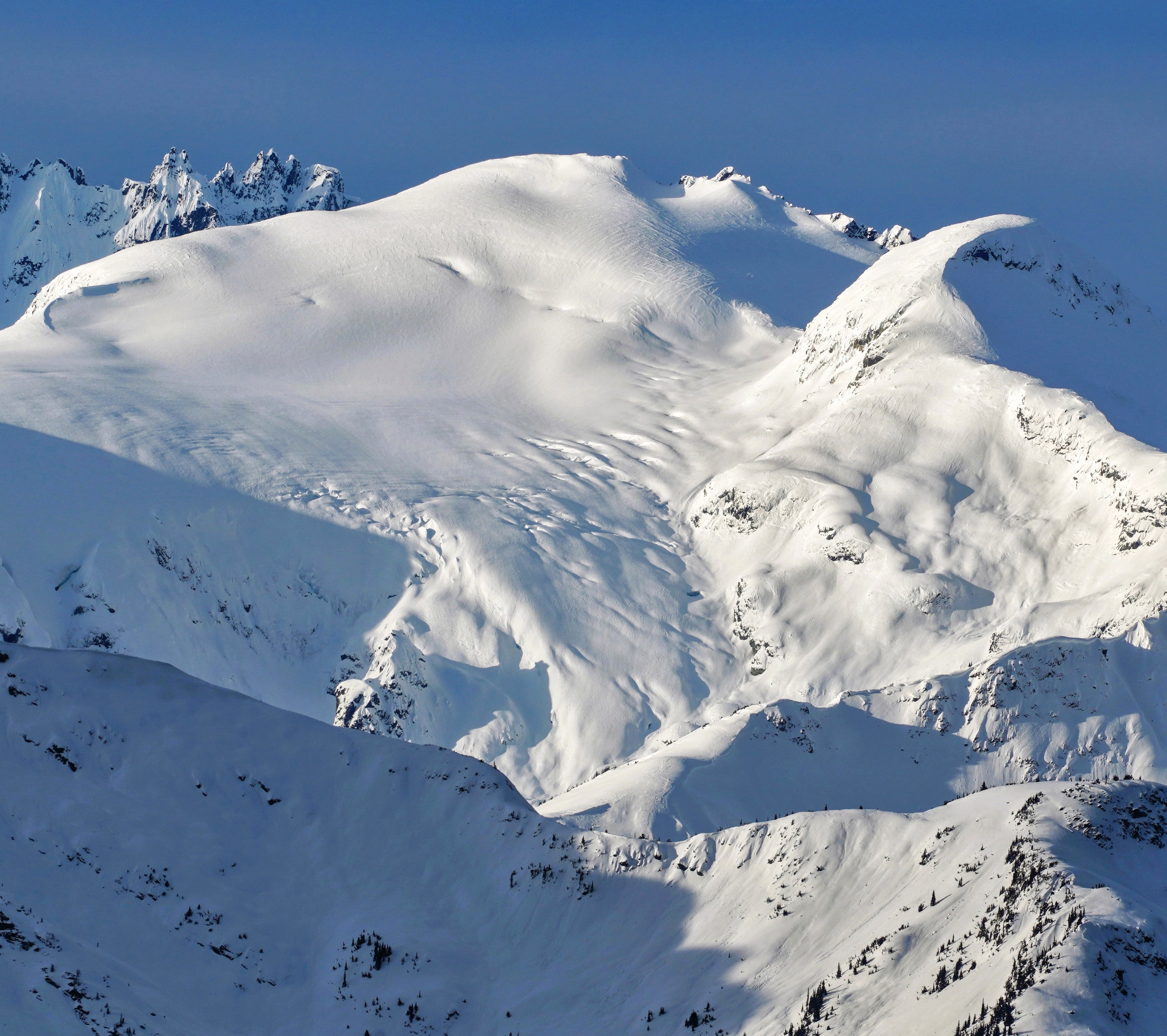
- Northeast aspect, from Mount Taylor

Highest point
- Elevation: 2,552 m (8,373 ft)
- Prominence: 481 m (1,578 ft)
- Parent peak: Wedge Mountain
- Isolation: 3.93 km (2.44 mi)
- Listing: Mountains of British Columbia
- Coordinates: 50°09′16″N 122°41′37″W

Naming
- Etymology: Neal Carter

Geography
- Location within British Columbia Location within Canada
- Interactive map of Mount Neal
- Location: British Columbia, Canada
- District: Lillooet Land District
- Protected area: Garibaldi Provincial Park
- Parent range: Pacific Ranges
- Topo map: NTS 92J2 Whistler

Climbing
- First ascent: 1949

Mount Neal is a 2,552-metre (8,373-foot) glaciated summit in British Columbia, Canada.

== Description ==
Mount Neal is located in the Coast Mountains, and 23 kilometres (14 mi) east-northeast of Whistler in Garibaldi Provincial Park. Precipitation runoff and glacial meltwater from this mountain's slopes drains to the Lillooet River via Ure, Kakila, and Chaos creeks. Mount Neal is more notable for its steep rise above local terrain than for its absolute elevation as topographic relief is significant with the summit rising 1,250 metres (4,100 ft) above Chaos Creek in three kilometres (1.9 mi).

== History ==
The mountain was named in 1929 by A.J. Campbell to honor Neal Carter (1902–1978), in recognition of Carter's excellent mapping of a large section of Garibaldi Park in the early days as a mountaineer. Carter was a prominent member of the British Columbia Mountaineering Club and was credited with many first ascents in Garibaldi Park in 1922–23. The toponym was officially adopted October 4, 1932, by the Geographical Names Board of Canada instead of the originally proposed toponym, Mount Carter.

The first ascent of the summit was made September 6, 1949, by three members of the University of British Columbia's Varsity Outdoor Club: Arnie Ede, Fleming McConnell, and Bob Nicholson.

== Climate ==
Based on the Köppen climate classification, Mount Neal is located in the marine west coast climate zone of western North America. Most weather fronts originate in the Pacific Ocean, and travel east toward the Coast Mountains where they are forced upward by the range (orographic lift), causing them to drop their moisture in the form of rain or snowfall. As a result, the Coast Mountains experience high precipitation, especially during the winter months in the form of snowfall. Winter temperatures can drop below −20 °C with wind chill factors below −30 °C. This climate supports the Carter Glacier on the east slope of the peak, as well as the Needles Glacier to the west. The months of July and August offer the most favorable weather for climbing Mount Neal.

== See also ==
- Geography of British Columbia
- Geology of British Columbia
