= Wedge (symbol) =

Logic symbol resembling an inverted "V"

∧

Wedge (symbol)
- In Unicode: U+2227 ∧ LOGICAL AND (&and;, &wedge;)

Related
- See also: U+2228 ∨ LOGICAL OR (&or;, &vee;)

Wedge (∧) is a symbol that looks similar to an in-line caret (^). It is used to represent various operations. In Unicode, the symbol is encoded U+2227 ∧ LOGICAL AND (&and;, &wedge;) and by \wedge and \land in TeX. The opposite symbol (∨) is called a vel, or sometimes a (descending) wedge. Some authors who call the descending wedge vel often call the ascending wedge ac (the corresponding Latin word for "and", also spelled "atque"), keeping their usage parallel.

== Use ==
Wedge is used to represent various operations:

- Logical conjunction in propositional logic and first-order logic
- Meet in lattice theory
- Exterior product or wedge product in differential geometry

== See also ==
- Turned v
- Vel (symbol)
- List of mathematical symbols
- List of logic symbols
- Wedge (disambiguation)
- /\ (disambiguation)
