= Wedge Island, South Australia =

Wedge Island
- Suburb
- Coordinates: 35.15517831°S 136.46613535°E
- Country: Australia
- State: South Australia
- LGA: unincorporated area
- Location: 196 km (122 mi) west of Adelaide city centre
- Established: 2014

Government
  - State electorate: Flinders
  - Federal division: Grey

Population
  - Total: 0 (SAL 2016)
- Time zone: UTC+9:30 (ACST)
  - Summer (DST): UTC+10:30 (ACST)
- Postcode: 5606
- Mean max temp: 18.6 °C (65.5 °F)
- Mean min temp: 13.7 °C (56.7 °F)
- Annual rainfall: 445.2 mm (17.53 in)

Wedge Island is a locality in South Australia located on Wedge Island at the mouth of Spencer Gulf. It is located about 196 kilometres (122 miles) west of the Adelaide city centre.

Its boundaries were created in 2014 for the purpose of providing property addressing for the island's residents. The locality was given the island's name in respect to the long established use.

Land use within the locality is divided between agriculture and tourism with the former dating back to the mid-19 century and the latter commencing in the 1980s.

Wedge Island is located within the federal Division of Grey, the state electoral district of Flinders and the unincorporated area of South Australia.

== See also ==
- Wedge Island (disambiguation)
