= /\ =

/\ may refer to:

- Λ, uppercase lambda, the 11th letter of the Greek alphabet
- Boolean "and" operator, formed with a slash and a backslash (ASCII symbol "/\")
  - /\, an ALGOL 68 boolean "and" operator
  - /\, the boolean "and" operator in early K&R C in Unix V6, Unix V7 and more recently BSD 2.11
- ∧, the wedge symbol, used for logical conjunction
- , the caret symbol

== See also ==
- Chevron (insignia), a V-shaped mark, often inverted
