= Wedge Pass =

Mountain pass in British Columbia, Canada

- Location within British Columbia
- Elevation: 1,430 m (4,690 ft)

Third Approach
- Location: British Columbia, Canada
- Range: Garibaldi Ranges
- Coordinates: 50°06′00″N 122°47′00″W
- Topo map: NTS 92J2 Whistler

Wedge Pass, also known as Billygoat Pass, 1,430 m (4,690 ft), is a mountain pass in the northern Garibaldi Ranges, the southwesternmost subdivisions of the Pacific Ranges of the Coast Mountains in British Columbia, Canada. Located immediately on the southern flank of Wedge Mountain and to the immediate north of the Spearhead Range, site of the Blackcomb half of the Whistler Blackcomb Ski Area, it connects the head of Wedge Creek (W), a tributary of the Green River with those of Billgoat Creek (E), a tributary of the Lillooet River (as is the Green River). The pass is within Garibaldi Provincial Park and has no road access.

== See also ==
- List of mountain passes
