= Wedges Creek =

Stream in Clark County, Wisconsin, U.S.

Coordinates: 44°28′57″N 90°40′10″W

Wedges Creek is a stream in Clark County, Wisconsin, in the United States.

== History ==
Wedges Creek derives its name from John D. Wage, a lumberman.

== See also ==
- List of rivers of Wisconsin
