= Wedge Island =

Wedge Island may refer to:

Australia

- Wedge Island (South Australia)
  - Wedge Island, South Australia, a locality
- Wedge Island (Tasmania)
- Wedge Island (Western Australia)

Canada

- Wedge Island (Nova Scotia)
- Wedge Island (Nunavut)

Fictional

- A small island nearby the larger Wuhu Island in the video game Wii Sports Resort
