= Wedgemount Lake =

Lake in British Columbia, Canada

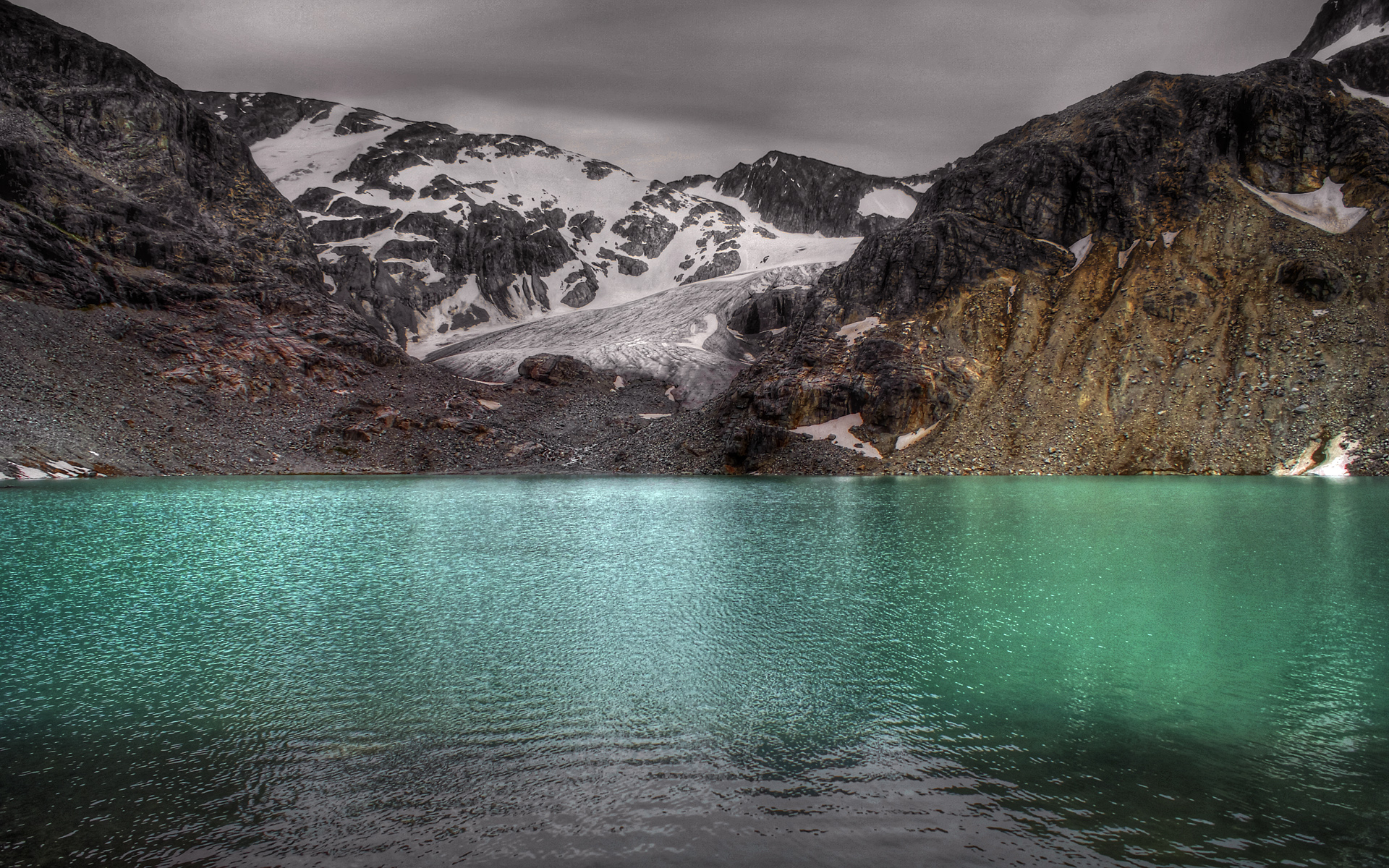

- Location within British Columbia
- Location: British Columbia
- Coordinates: 50.1594°N 122.8153°W
- Basin countries: Canada
- Surface elevation: 1,875 metres (6,152 ft)
- Settlements: No

Wedgemount Lake is a turquoise-coloured alpine lake located in Garibaldi Provincial Park of British Columbia, Canada. It is situated below Wedge Mountain, Parkhurst Mountain, Rethel Mountain, and Mount Weart. Meltwater from Wedgemount Glacier and Armchair Glacier feeds the lake, whereas Wedgemount Creek is the outflow from the lake.

== See also ==
- List of lakes of British Columbia
- Cascade Volcanoes
- Garibaldi Lake volcanic field
- Garibaldi Volcanic Belt
- Garibaldi Provincial Park
