= The Wedge (Alberta) =

Mountain in Alberta, Canada

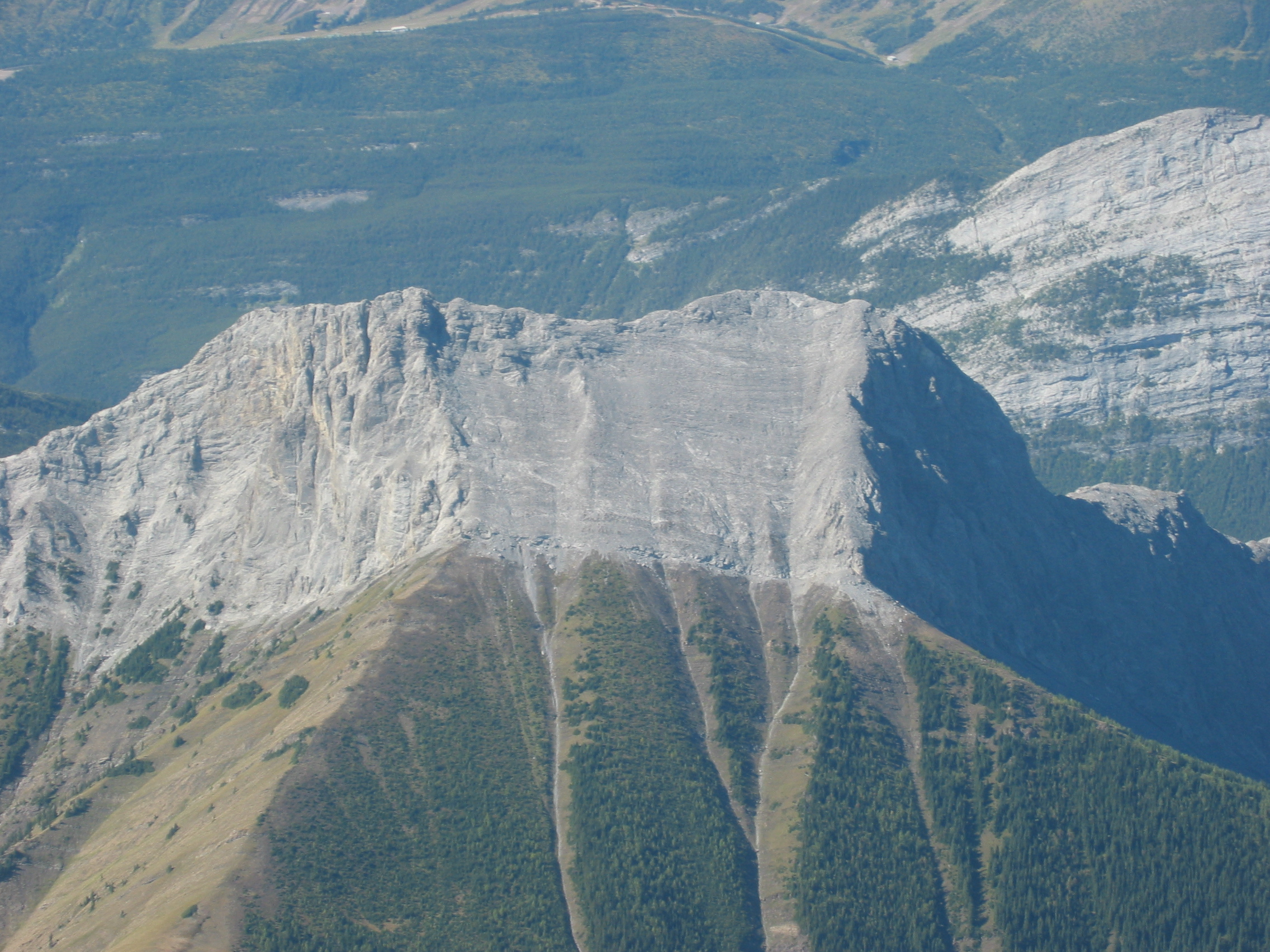
- Aerial view of The Wedge (Sept. 2006)

Highest point
- Elevation: 2,667 m (8,750 ft)
- Prominence: 686 m (2,251 ft)
- Parent peak: Mount Evan-Thomas
- Listing: Mountains of Alberta
- Coordinates: 50°50′58″N 115°08′05″W

Geography
- Location within Alberta
- Interactive map of The Wedge
- Country: Canada
- Province: Alberta
- Protected area: Kananaskis Country
- Parent range: Fisher Range
- Topo map: NTS 82J14 Spray Lakes Reservoir

Climbing
- Easiest route: easy/difficult scramble

The Wedge is a mountain in Alberta, Canada. It is part of the Fisher Range of the Southern Continental Ranges of the Canadian Rockies. It is located east of Highway 40 just southeast from the K-Country golf course, immediately southeast of Wedge Pond in Kananaskis Country.

== Scramble ==
1,100 m (3,609 ft) gain, mostly easy with a moderate section just above the tree line and a short difficult section on the ridge. The trail starts from the wedge pond parking lot. Either follow the shore counterclockwise until a trail takes off into the trees or follow the cutline south (right) from the gate to find a trail that soon joins the other and heads up the hill. It's a treed walk up 850 m (2,789 ft) to the tree line.

Once on the rocks the best route up is to keep to the right, beside the cliffs until you can get on top then it's an easy walk up to the false summit. From there a ridge walk leads to the true summit. One short section of the ridge is too narrow to walk on so one has to find hand and foot holds and hang on the side of the ridge for 4 m (13 ft) or so. Then the ridge widens again.

== See also ==
- Mountain peaks of Canada

== Gallery ==
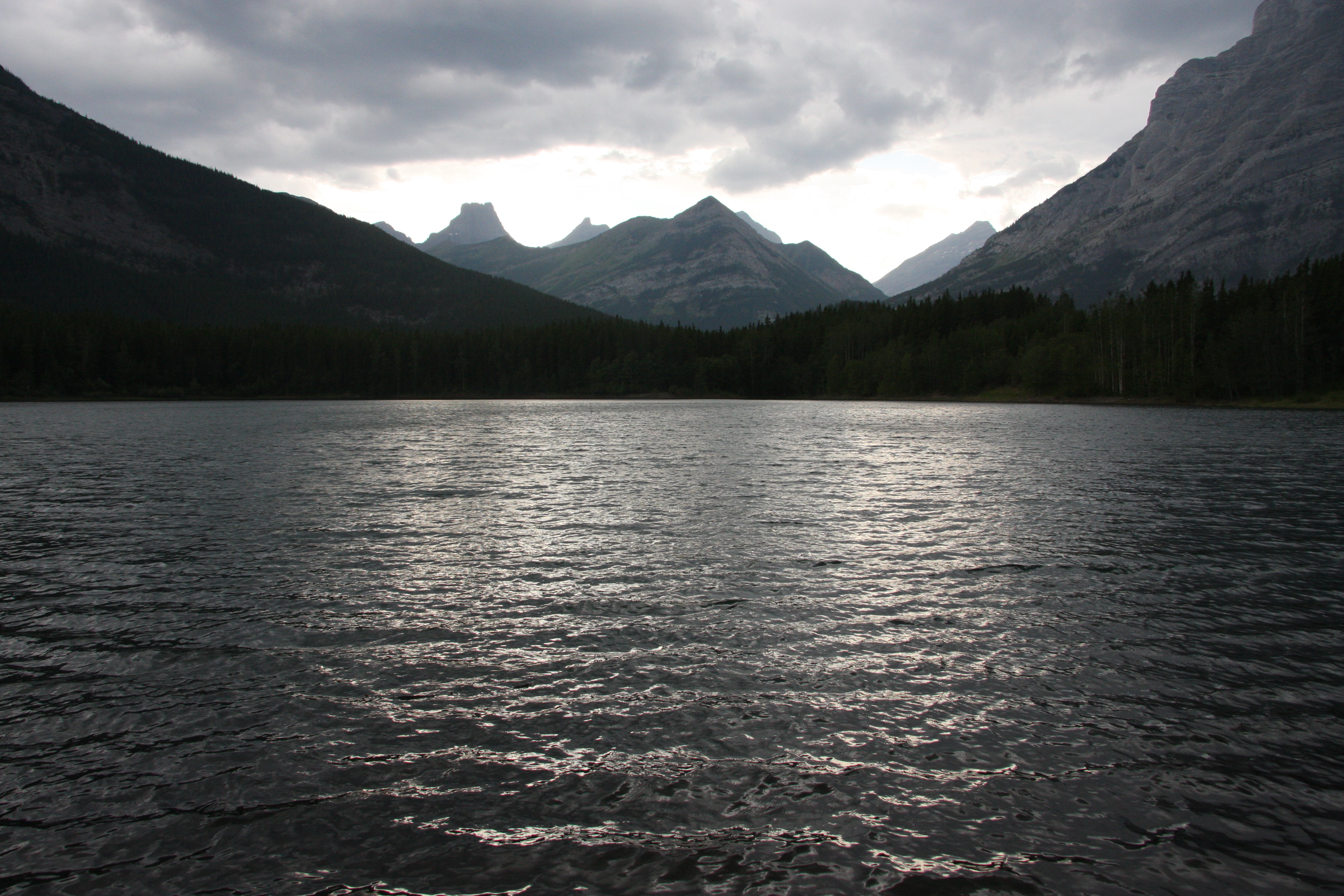
View from Wedge Pond.

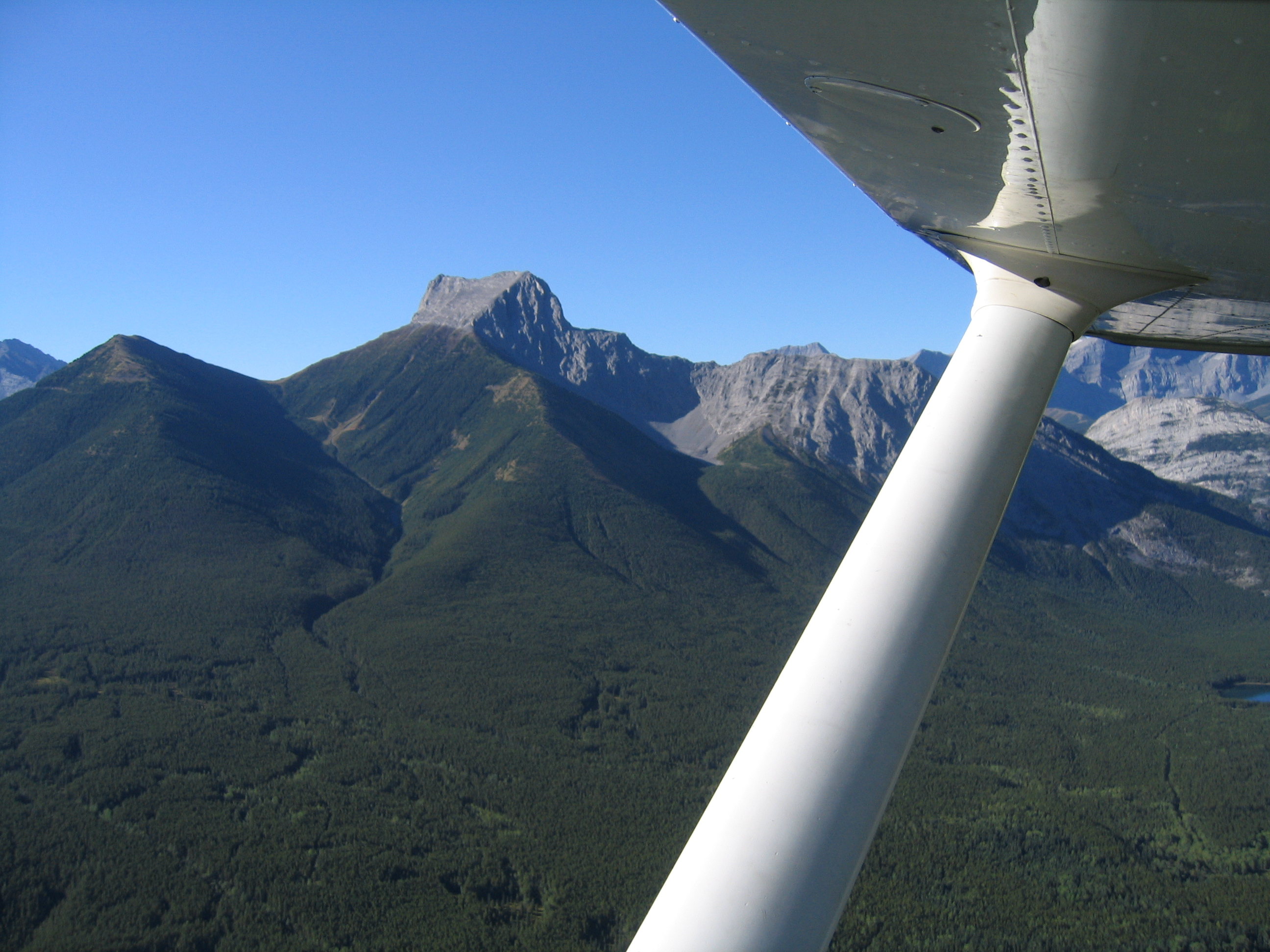
The wedge.

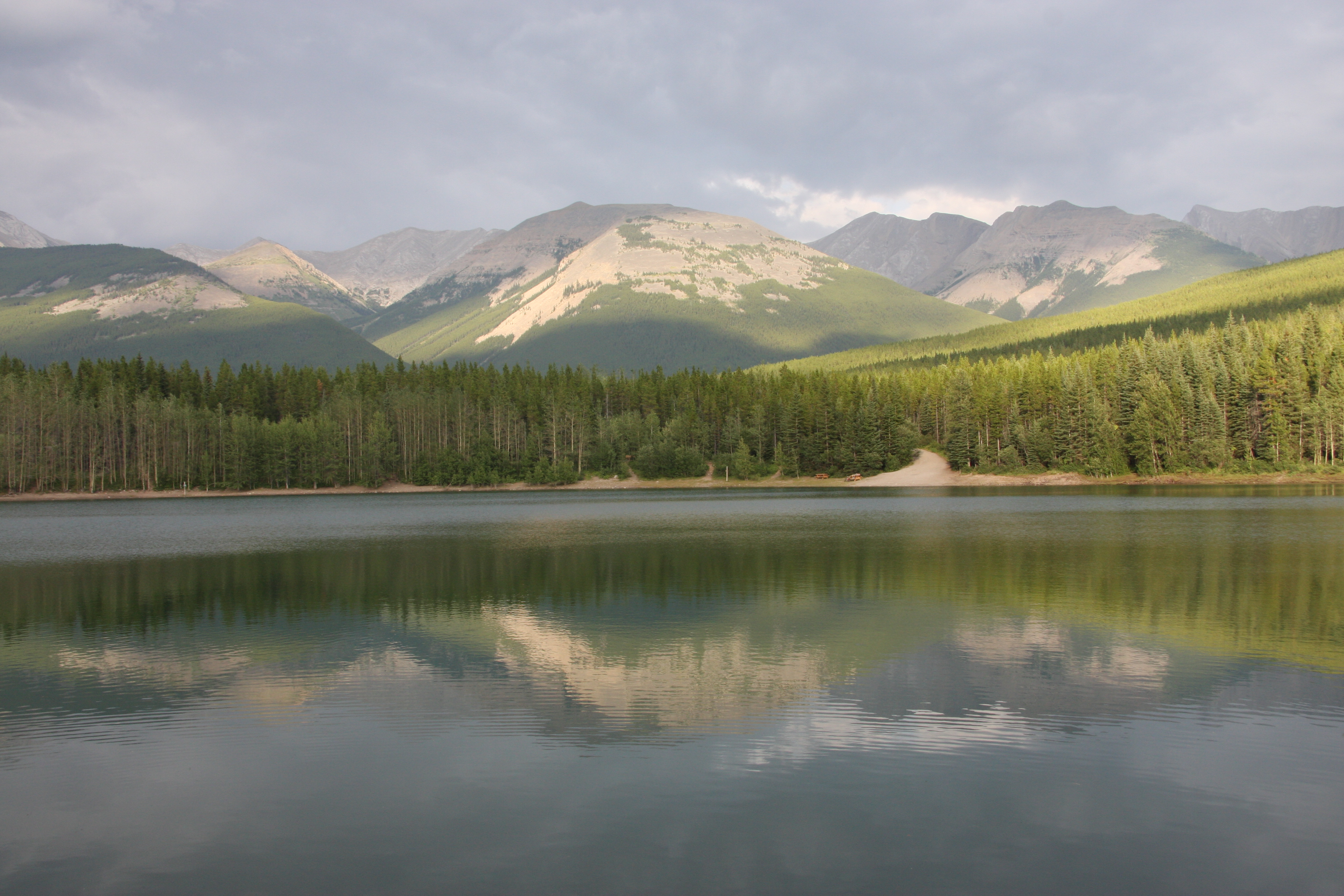
Looking north from Wedge Pond.

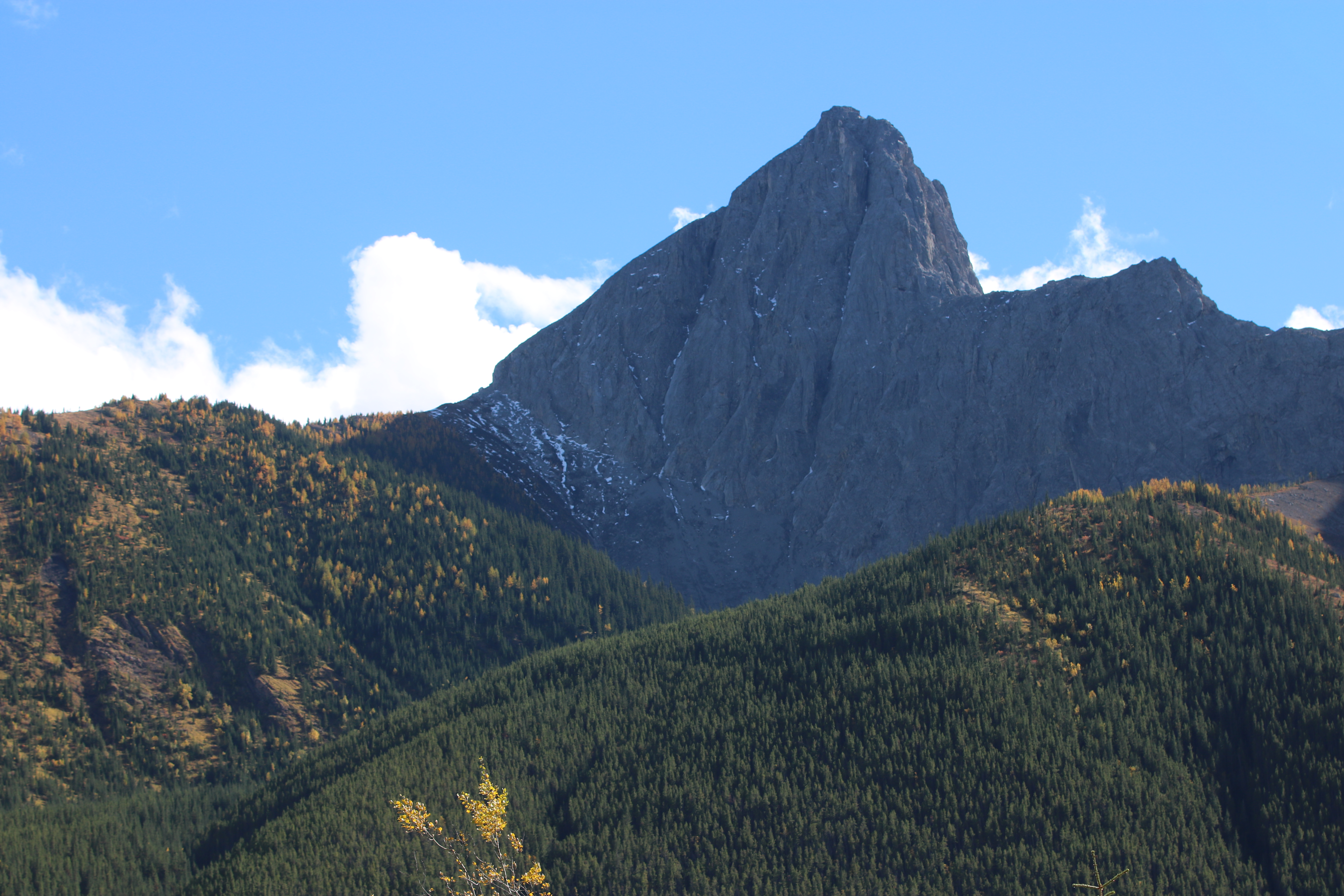
The Wedge

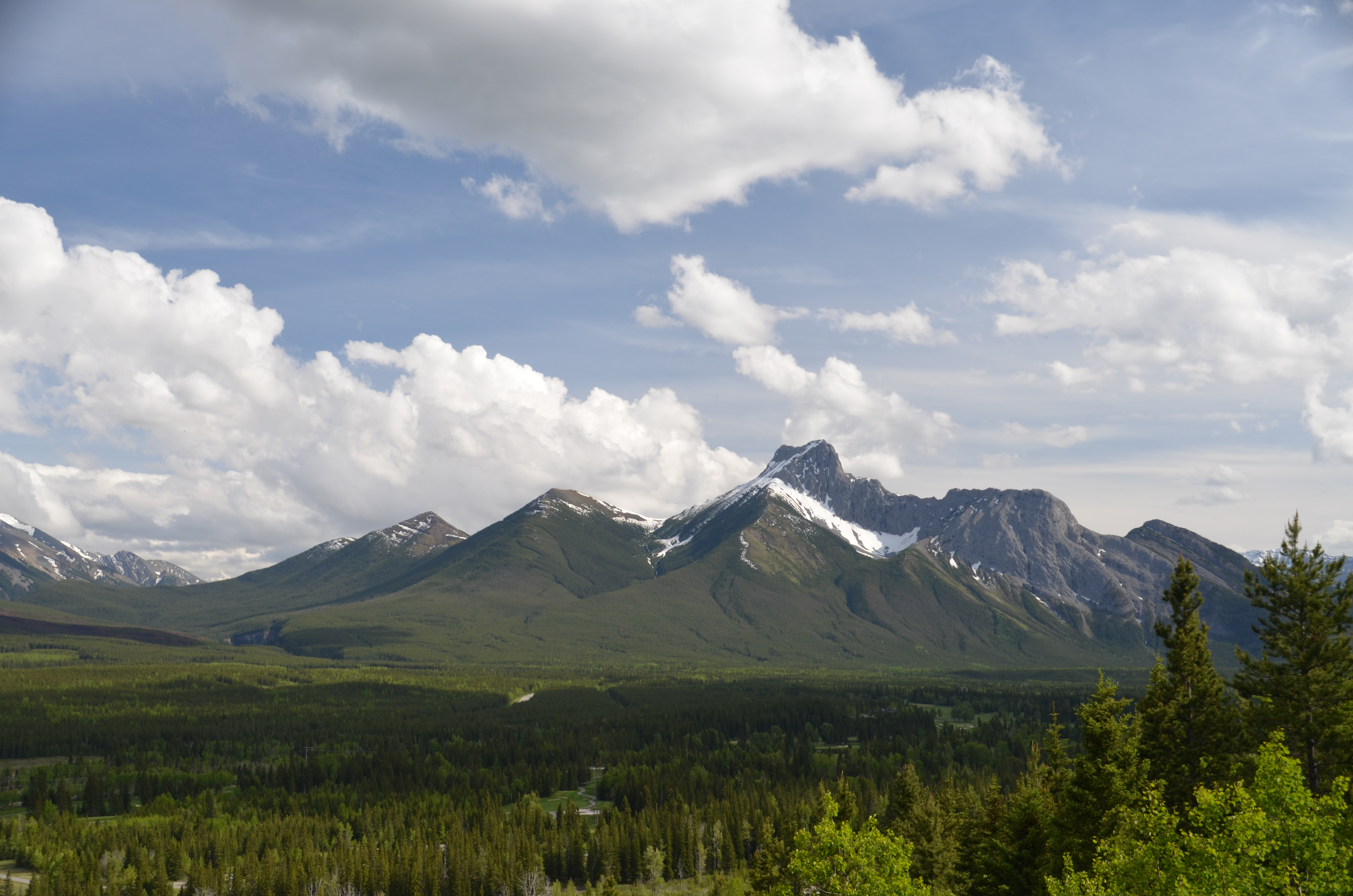
The Wedge
