= The Wedge (Alaska) =

Mountain in Alaska, United States

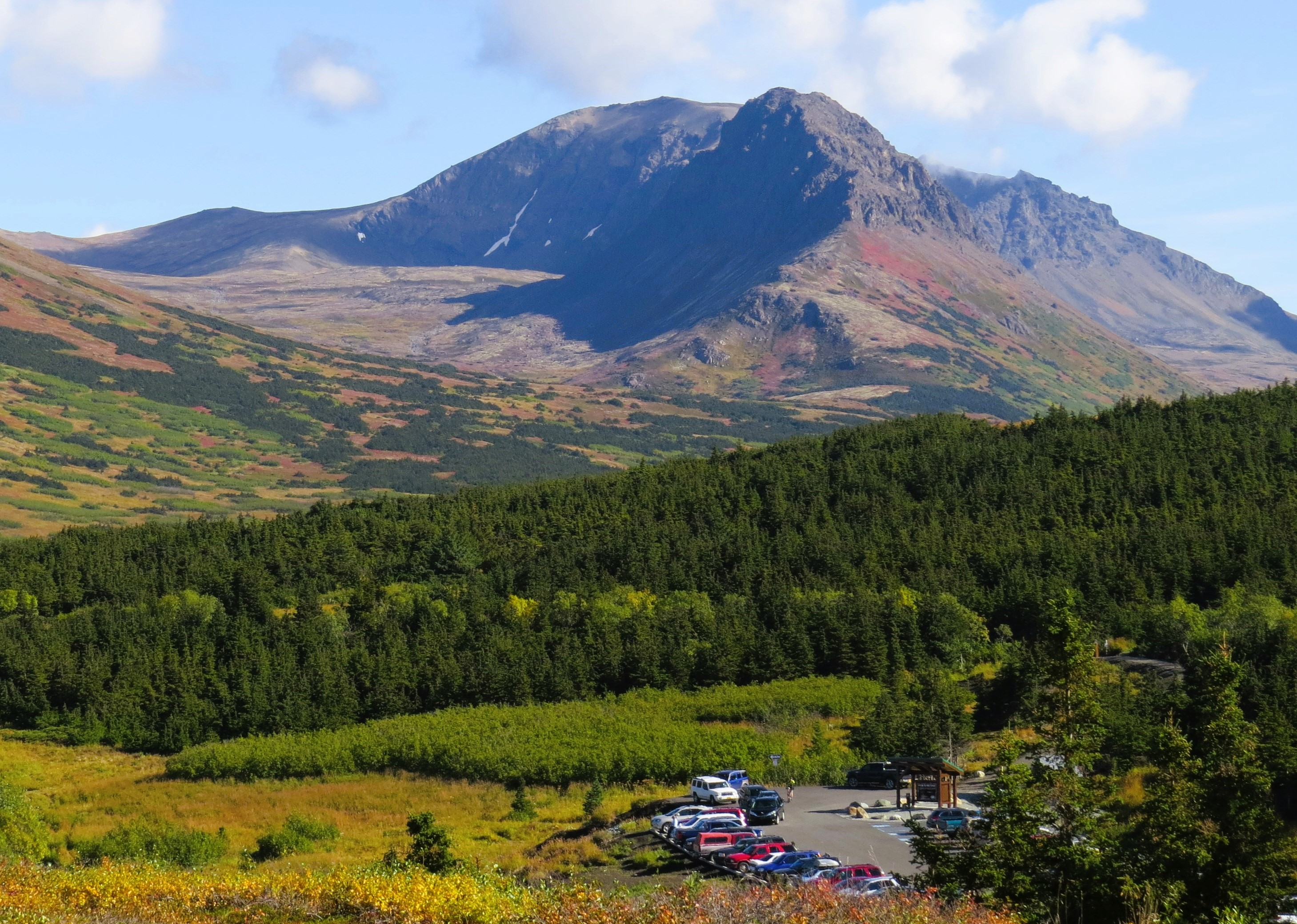
- West aspect

Highest point
- Elevation: 4,660 ft (1,420 m)
- Prominence: 610 ft (186 m)
- Parent peak: The Ramp
- Isolation: 1.14 mi (1.83 km)
- Coordinates: 61°04′29″N 149°33′47″W

Geography
- Location within Alaska
- Interactive map of The Wedge
- Country: United States
- State: Alaska
- Borough: Anchorage Municipality
- Protected area: Chugach State Park
- Parent range: Chugach Mountains
- Topo map: USGS Anchorage A-7

Climbing
- Easiest route: Scrambling class 3

The Wedge is a 4,660-foot (1,420 m) mountain summit in the U.S. state of Alaska.

== Description ==
The Wedge is located 13 miles (21 km) southeast of Anchorage in the Chugach Mountains and Chugach State Park. Precipitation runoff from the peak drains west into Campbell Creek and east into headwaters of Ship Creek. Topographic relief is significant as the summit rises nearly 2,000 feet (550 m) above South Fork Campbell Creek in one mile (1.6 km) and 2,000 feet (550 m) above Ship Lake in 0.75 mi (1.21 km). Access to the mountain is via the Powerline Trail. The Wedge is a popular destination during the months of May through September. The mountain's descriptive toponym has been officially adopted by the United States Geological Survey.

== Climate ==
Based on the Köppen climate classification, The Wedge is located in a subarctic climate zone with long, cold, snowy winters, and mild summers. Weather systems coming off the Gulf of Alaska are forced upwards by the Chugach Mountains (orographic lift), causing heavy precipitation in the form of rain and snow. Winter temperatures can drop below 10 °F with wind chill factors below 0 °F.

== Gallery ==
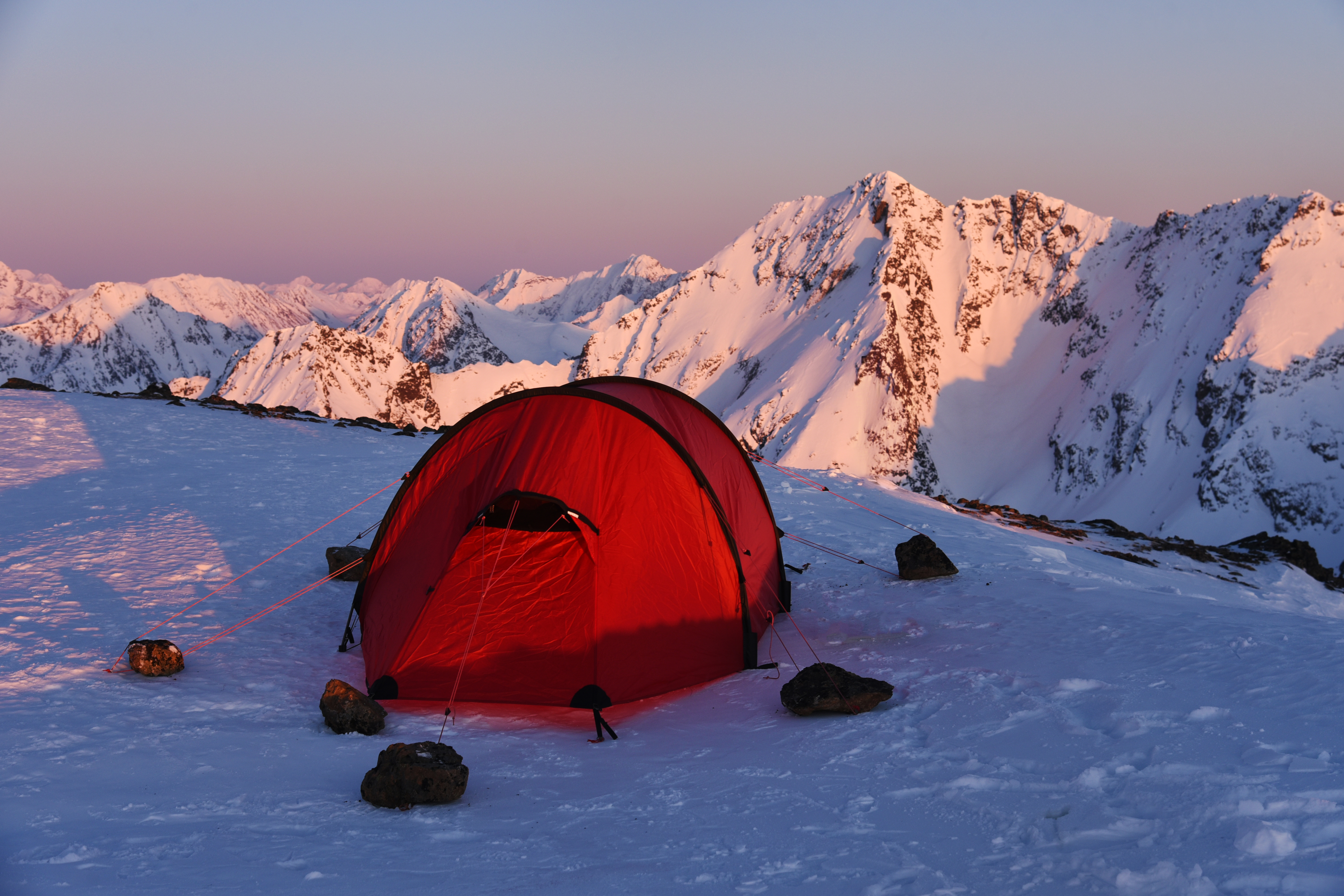
Camping on the summit of The Wedge. Avalanche Mountain in background.

== See also ==
- Geography of Alaska
