= Neal Carter (mountaineer) =

Canadian mountaineer & surveyor (1902–1978)

- Born: Neal Marshall Carter; December 12, 1902; Vancouver, British Columbia, Canada
- Died: March 3, 1978 (aged 75); Barbados
- Education: University of British Columbia; McGill University
- Occupations: Marine biologist; Cartographer; Photographer; Mountaineer; Surveyor

Neal Marshall Carter (December 12, 1902 – March 3, 1978) was a Canadian marine biologist, cartographer, photographer, mountaineer and surveyor. He is most famous for his explorations in British Columbia, especially in the Coast Mountains where he made several first ascents.

== Biography ==
Carter was born on December 14, 1902, in Vancouver, British Columbia. He was educated at the University of British Columbia and then at McGill University where he earned a PhD in organic chemistry. Carter was a marine biologist in his professional life, having worked in fisheries research from 1930 to 1962. He was introduced to mountaineering and to the British Columbia Mountaineering Club by Tom Fyles. Carter remained as a member of that organization from 1920 until 1926 when he left to become a member of the Alpine Club of Canada.

The Coast Mountains of British Columbia were Carter's first favorite place for climbing mountains. Here, he explored new peaks and made several first ascents in what is now Garibaldi Provincial Park. Carter was a skilled surveyor, photographer and cartographer, having created the first topographic maps of Garibaldi Provincial Park and of the Tantalus Range in the 1920s. In the 1930s, Carter explored peaks at the head of the Lillooet and Toba rivers. Carter along with mountaineers Alec Dalgleish, Alan Lambert and Eric Brooks attempted a first ascent of Mount Waddington in 1934. Their attempt ended in tragedy on June 26, 1934, when Dalgleish fell to his death as a result of his climbing rope having been severed by a sharp-edged rock.

In the early 1940s, Carter surveyed the Seven Sisters Peaks, a multi-summit massif near Smithers in the Bulkley Ranges of the Interior Mountains. He was the first to climb Weeskinisht Peak, the highest point of the Seven Sisters Peaks. The first ascents of Monmouth Mountain and Mount Gilbert, two peaks situated in the Coast Mountains, were made by Carter in the 1950s. In 1974, Carter was made an honorary member of the Alpine Club of Canada. He was also named a fellow of the Royal Canadian Geographical Society for his mapping work. Carter died on March 15, 1978, while vacationing in Barbados of the Caribbean and engaging in recreational diving among coral reefs. Mount Neal and Carter Glacier at the north end of Garibaldi Provincial Park were named in honour of him.

== First ascents ==
- 1921 Grizzly Mountain north ridge
- 1922 Isosceles Peak
- 1923 Wedge Mountain
- 1923 Diavolo Peak
- 1923 Angelo Peak
- 1923 Mount James Turner
- 1929 Mount Davidson
- 1931 Mount Job
- 1931 Capricorn Mountain
- 1931 Devastator Peak
- 1931 Mount Meager
- 1931 Plinth Peak
- 1931 Pylon Peak
- 1941 Weeskinisht Peak
- 1951 Monmouth Mountain
- 1954 Mount Gilbert
