= Mount Weart =

Triple summit mountain in the country of Canada

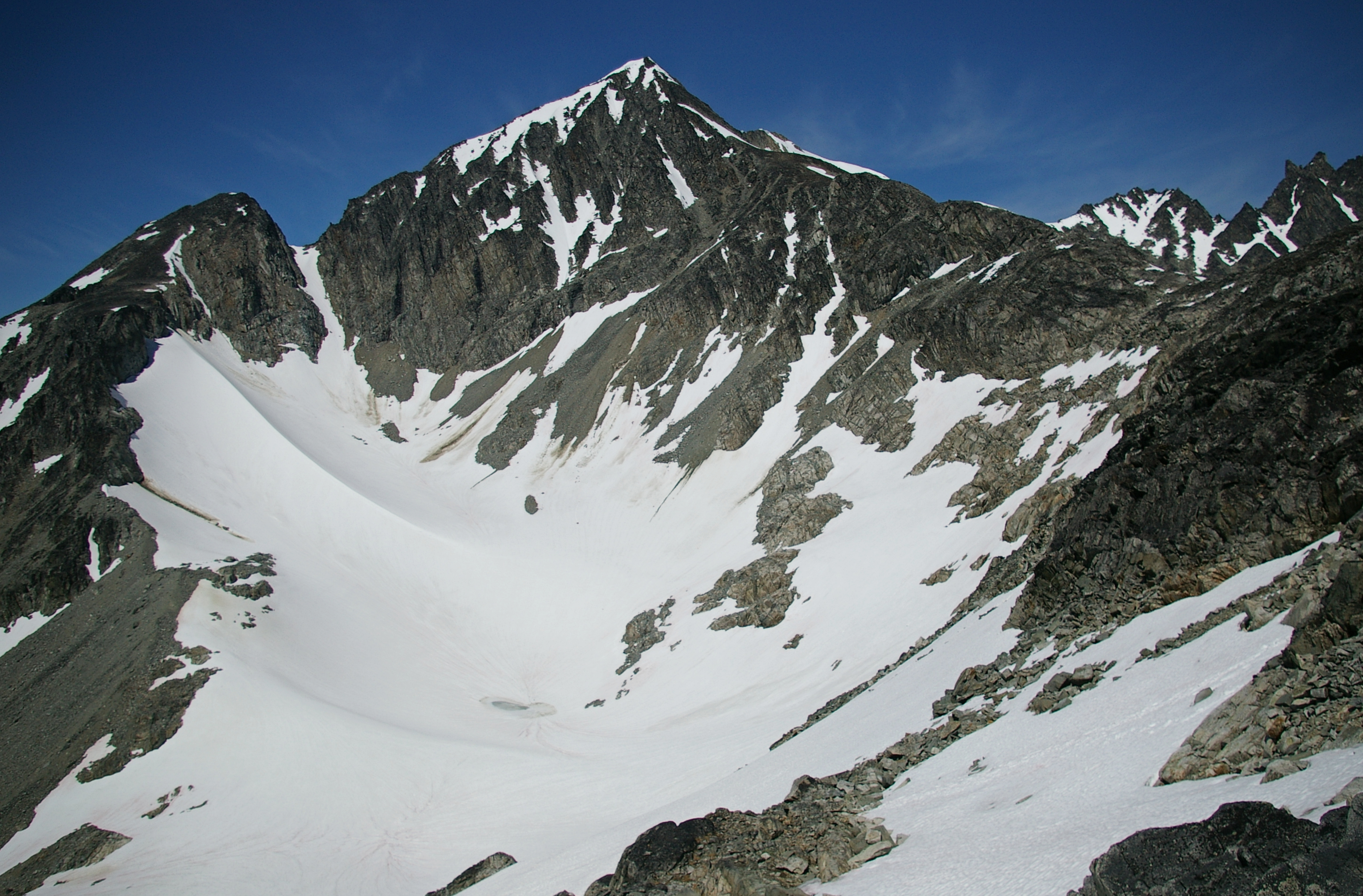
- Mount Weart, south summit featured, the highest of the three peaks

Highest point
- Elevation: 2,835 m (9,301 ft)
- Prominence: 365 m (1,198 ft)
- Parent peak: Wedge Mountain (2895 m)
- Listing: Mountains of British Columbia
- Coordinates: 50°09′59″N 122°47′13″W

Geography
- Location within British Columbia Location within Canada
- Interactive map of Mount Weart
- Country: Canada
- Province: British Columbia
- District: New Westminster Land District
- Protected area: Garibaldi Provincial Park
- Parent range: Garibaldi Ranges; Coast Ranges
- Topo map: NTS 92J2 Whistler

Climbing
- First ascent: 1932 by B. Cook, P. Tait
- Easiest route: Scrambling via southeast ridge

Mount Weart is a 2,835-metre (9,301-foot) triple-summit mountain located in the Garibaldi Ranges of the Coast Mountains, in northwestern Garibaldi Provincial Park of southwestern British Columbia, Canada. It is situated 14 km (9 mi) northeast of Whistler, and its nearest higher peak is Wedge Mountain, 3.7 km (2 mi) to the south, which is the only peak within the park higher than Weart. The Armchair Glacier rests below the west aspect of the summit, and the massive Weart Glacier spans the northern and eastern aspects of the mountain. Precipitation runoff from the peak and meltwater from the glaciers drains into Wedgemount Lake and tributaries of the Lillooet River.

== History ==
Originally known by the mountaineering community as Armchair Mountain or The Armchair, the Garibaldi Park Board submitted the name "Mount Weart" in 1928, after their board's chairman at the time, John Walter Weart (1861–1941). The mountain's toponym was officially adopted on September 2, 1930, by the Geographical Names Board of Canada. The first ascent of the mountain was made in 1932 by B. Cook and P. Tait.

== Climate ==
Based on the Köppen climate classification, Mount Weart is located in the marine west coast climate zone of western North America. Most weather fronts originate in the Pacific Ocean, and travel east toward the Coast Mountains where they are forced upward by the range (orographic lift), causing them to drop their moisture in the form of rain or snowfall. As a result, the Coast Mountains experience high precipitation, especially during the winter months in the form of snowfall. Winter temperatures can drop below −20 °C with wind chill factors below −30 °C. The months July through September offer the most favorable weather for climbing Weart.

== Climbing Routes ==
Established rock climbing routes on Mount Weart:

- Southeast Ridge - class 2
- Southwest Ridge - class 3
- Northwest Ridge - class 4
- North Face - steep ice

== Gallery ==
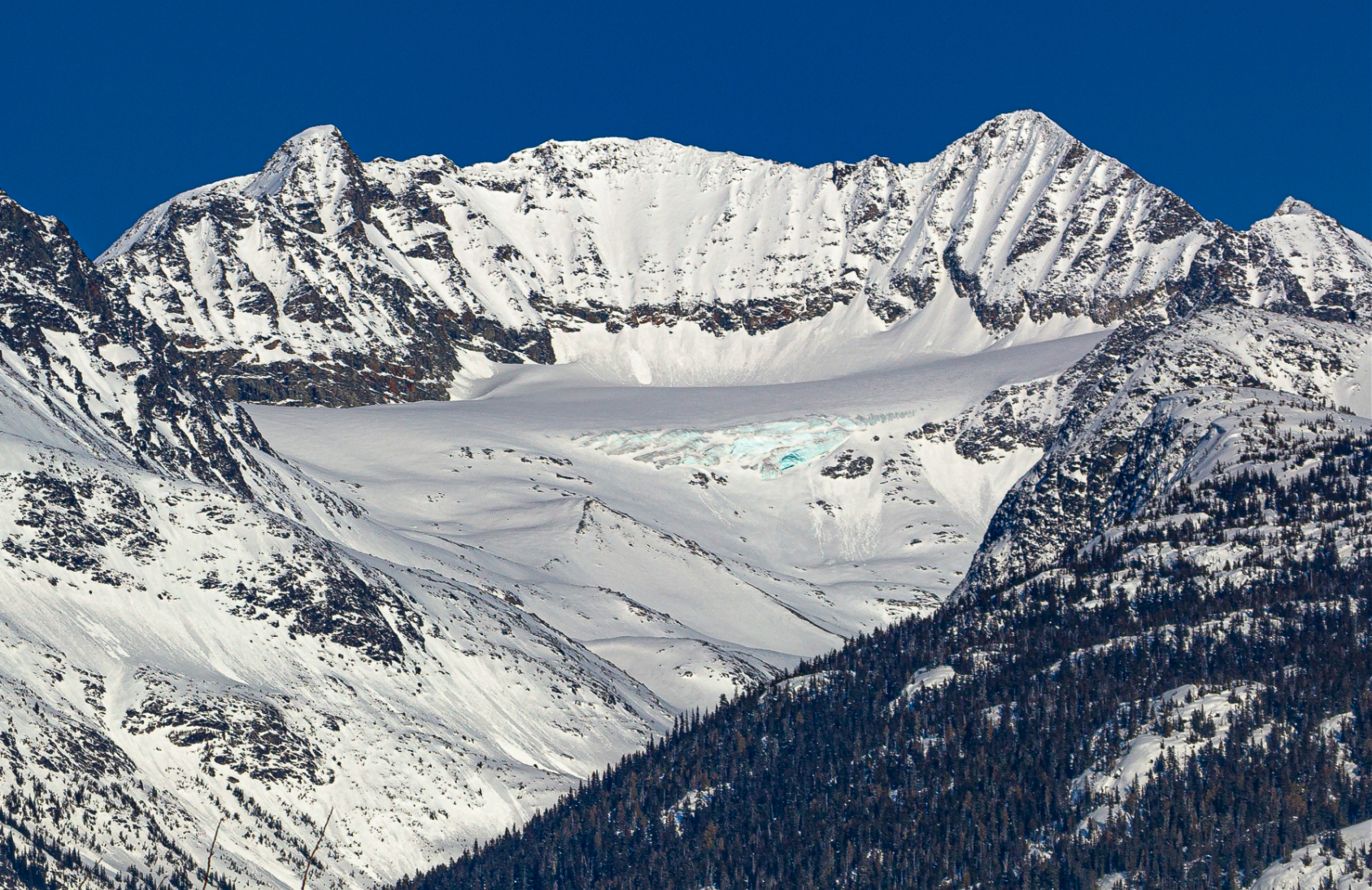
Mount Weart from Highway 99

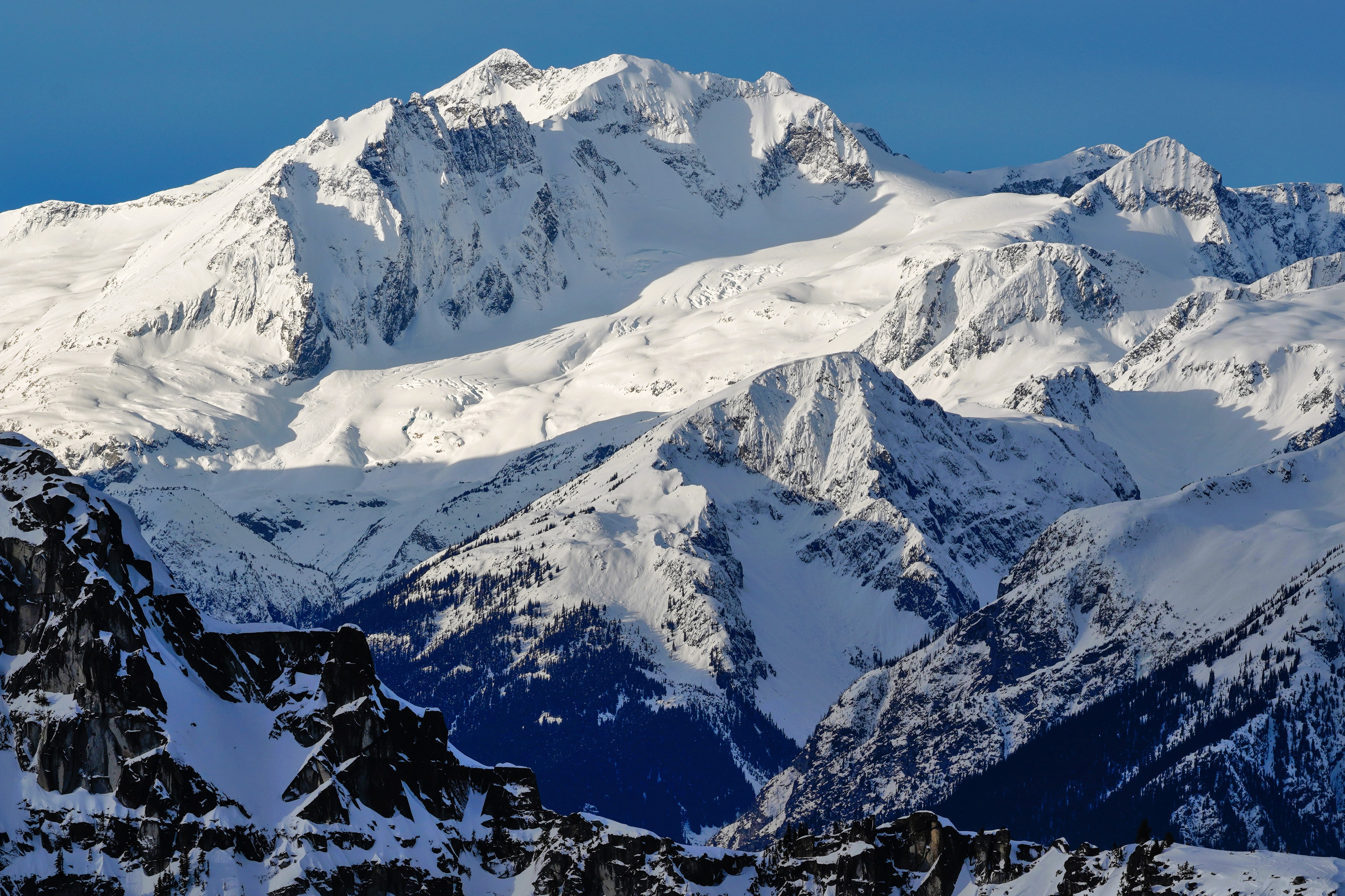
Northeast aspect, viewed from Mt. Taylor

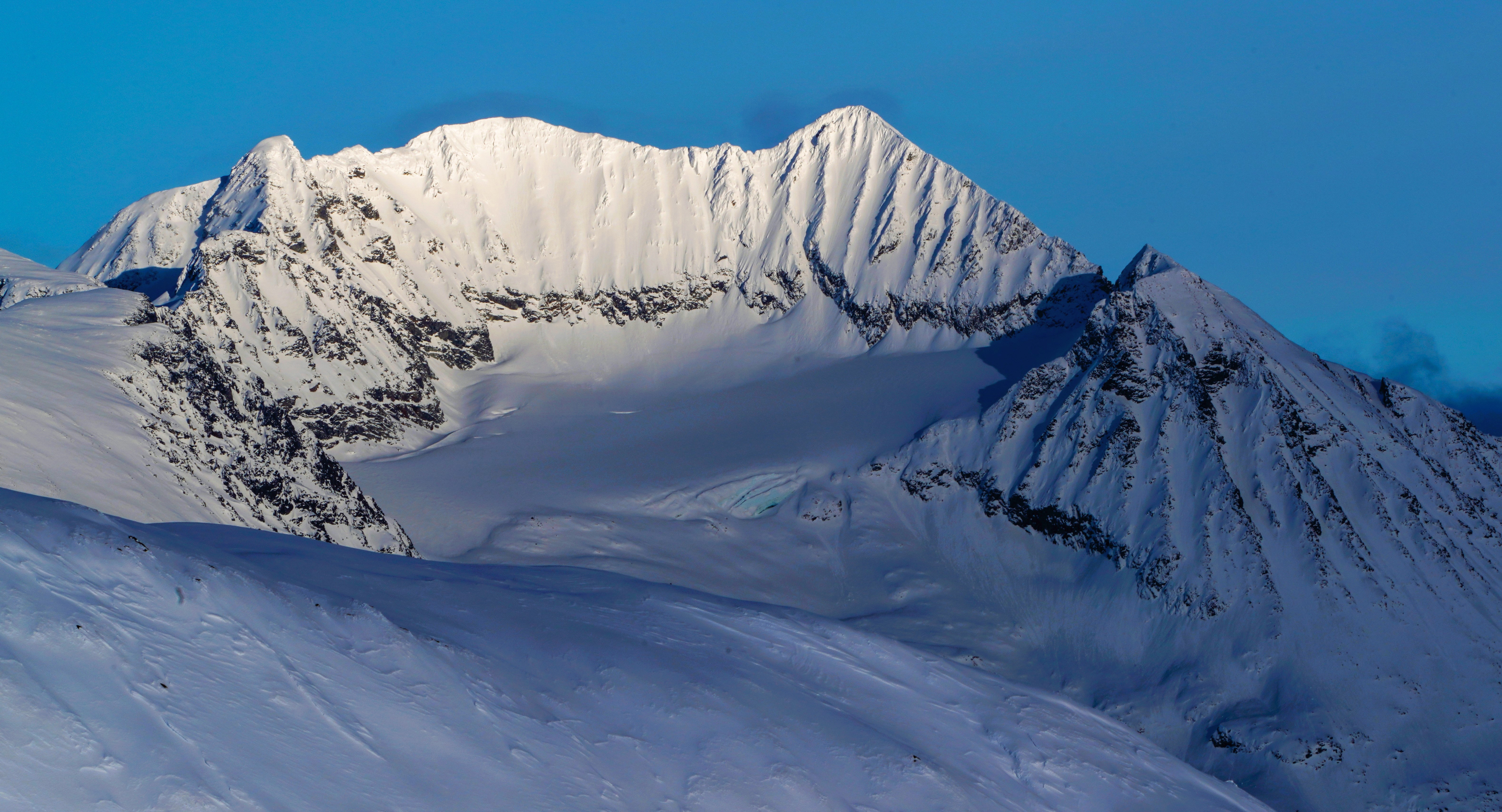
West face in winter

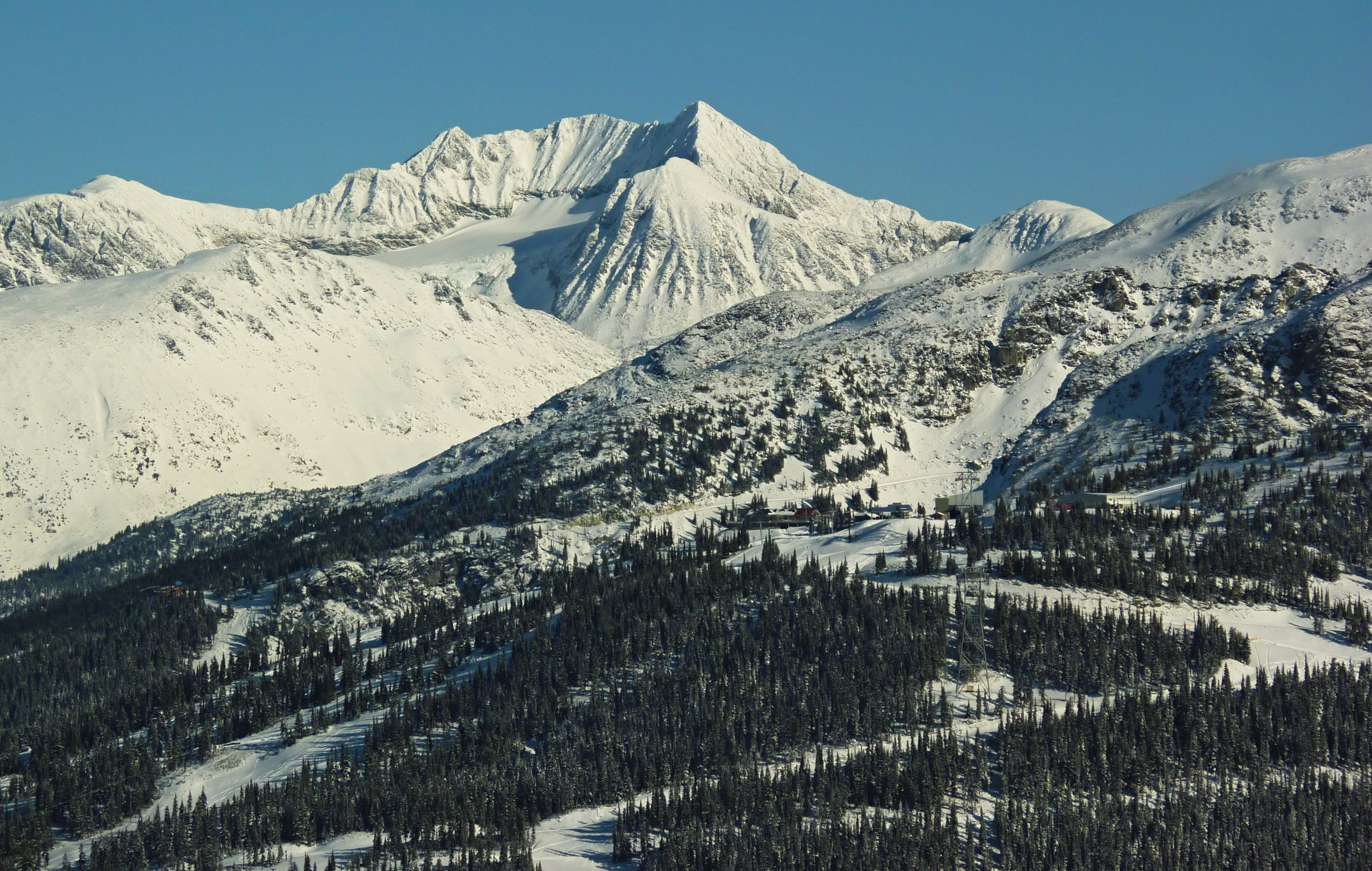
Mt. Weart from Whistler Mountain

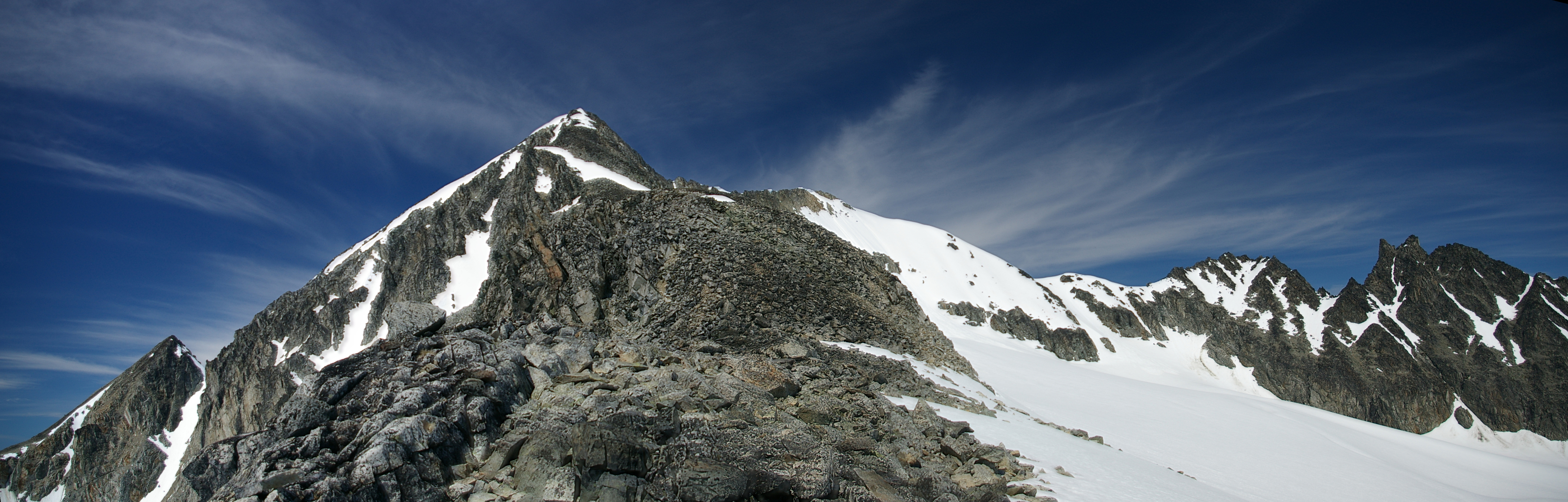
Southeast Ridge, with "The Owls" to right

== See also ==
- Geography of British Columbia
- Geology of British Columbia
