= Wedge Mountain =

Mountain in British Columbia, Canada

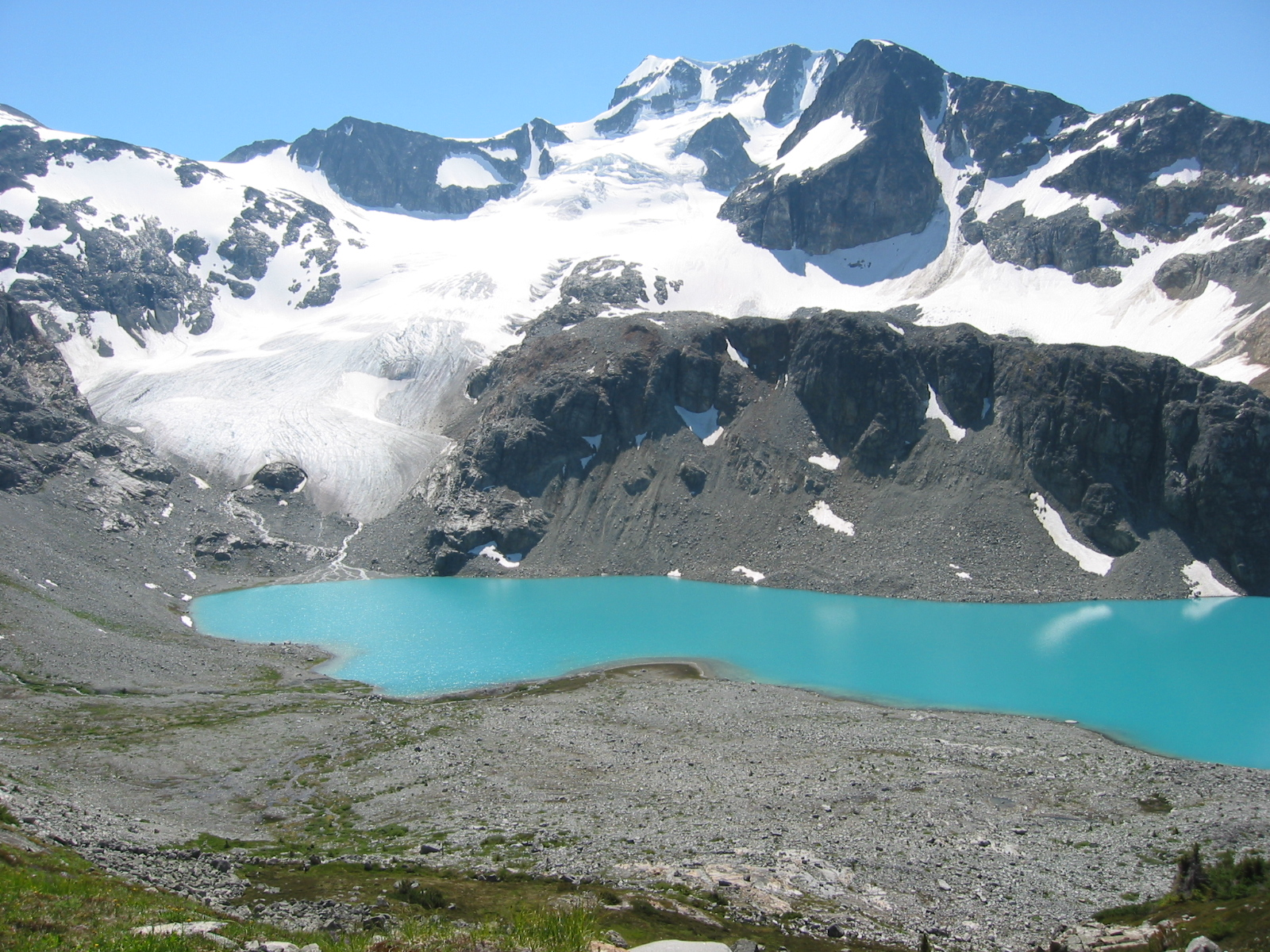
- Wedge Mountain from the north, with Wedgemount Lake in the foreground. The Wedgemount Lake hut and lake outlet are out of frame to the right.

Highest point
- Elevation: 2,895 m (9,498 ft)
- Prominence: 2,249 m (7,379 ft)
- Listing: Mountains of British Columbia; North America prominent peaks 58th; Canada highest major peaks 79th; Canada most prominent peaks 22nd
- Coordinates: 50°07′59″N 122°47′36″W

Geography
- Location within British Columbia
- Interactive map of Wedge Mountain
- Country: Canada
- Province: British Columbia
- District: New Westminster Land District
- Protected area: Garibaldi Provincial Park
- Parent range: Garibaldi Ranges
- Topo map: NTS 92J2 Whistler

Climbing
- First ascent: 1923 N. Carter; C. Townsend
- Easiest route: 3rd class snow climb with Glacier travel

Wedge Mountain, 2,895 m (9,498 ft) prominence: 2,249 m (7,379 ft), often locally referred to as The Wedge or simply "Wedge", is the highest summit in the Garibaldi Ranges and therefore also Garibaldi Provincial Park, and is among the nearest of the many peaks visible from the Whistler Blackcomb Ski Area, lying north across the valley of Billygoat Pass from the Spearhead Range, which includes one of that resort's two flagship mountains, Blackcomb. It was named for its distinctive wedge shape by the Garibaldi Park Board in 1932 in preference to Mount Vancouver, which had been submitted earlier. It is part of an unnamed range forming the most northerly group of peaks in the Garibaldi Ranges, the other two most notable being Mount Weart, known as the Armchair because of its shape, and Mount Currie, which overlooks the First Nations Reserve of the same name and the neighbouring town of Pemberton. Wedge's very high prominence is defined by the divide between the Green and Cheakamus Rivers at a locality at the south end of Alta Lake known as Tokum Corners.

The mountain sits astride the boundary between the New Westminster and Lillooet Land Districts.

== Climbing and access ==
A 6 km (3.7 mi) steep hike leads to a backcountry shelter and camping area at Wedgemount Lake, which is an approximately three-hour hike (without heavy gear) from a parking lot near the Wedgemont Green Lake railstop and track-crossing of the CNR. Across Wedgemount Lake from the cabin is the glacier, and above that the summit. The cabin, located at the North end of the lake, is at approximately 1,920 m (6,299 ft) feet. There are multiple ways of approaching the summit. The more direct way is a knife-edge ridge called the Northeast Arete, which leads more or less directly to the summit, requiring a full complement of winter mountaineering equipment. Another route that can be taken without such tools is the South face. This part can be seen from the valley, appearing to be a steep rock-covered slope. To approach the South face parties must climb over the glacier to the West Couloir, across the bottom of it and up to the left. Most of Wedge is in a provincial park, so helicopters are not allowed to drop people off there. In the early 1970s the glacier that now almost reaches the eastern end of Wedgemount Lake extended into the lake and at its terminus was approximately ten metres in height.

== Climate ==
Based on the Köppen climate classification, Wedge Mountain is located in the marine west coast climate zone of western North America. Most weather fronts originate in the Pacific Ocean, and travel east toward the Coast Mountains where they are forced upward by the range (Orographic lift), causing them to drop their moisture in the form of rain or snowfall. As a result, the Coast Mountains experience high precipitation, especially during the winter months in the form of snowfall. The months of July through September offer the most favorable weather for climbing.

== Gallery ==
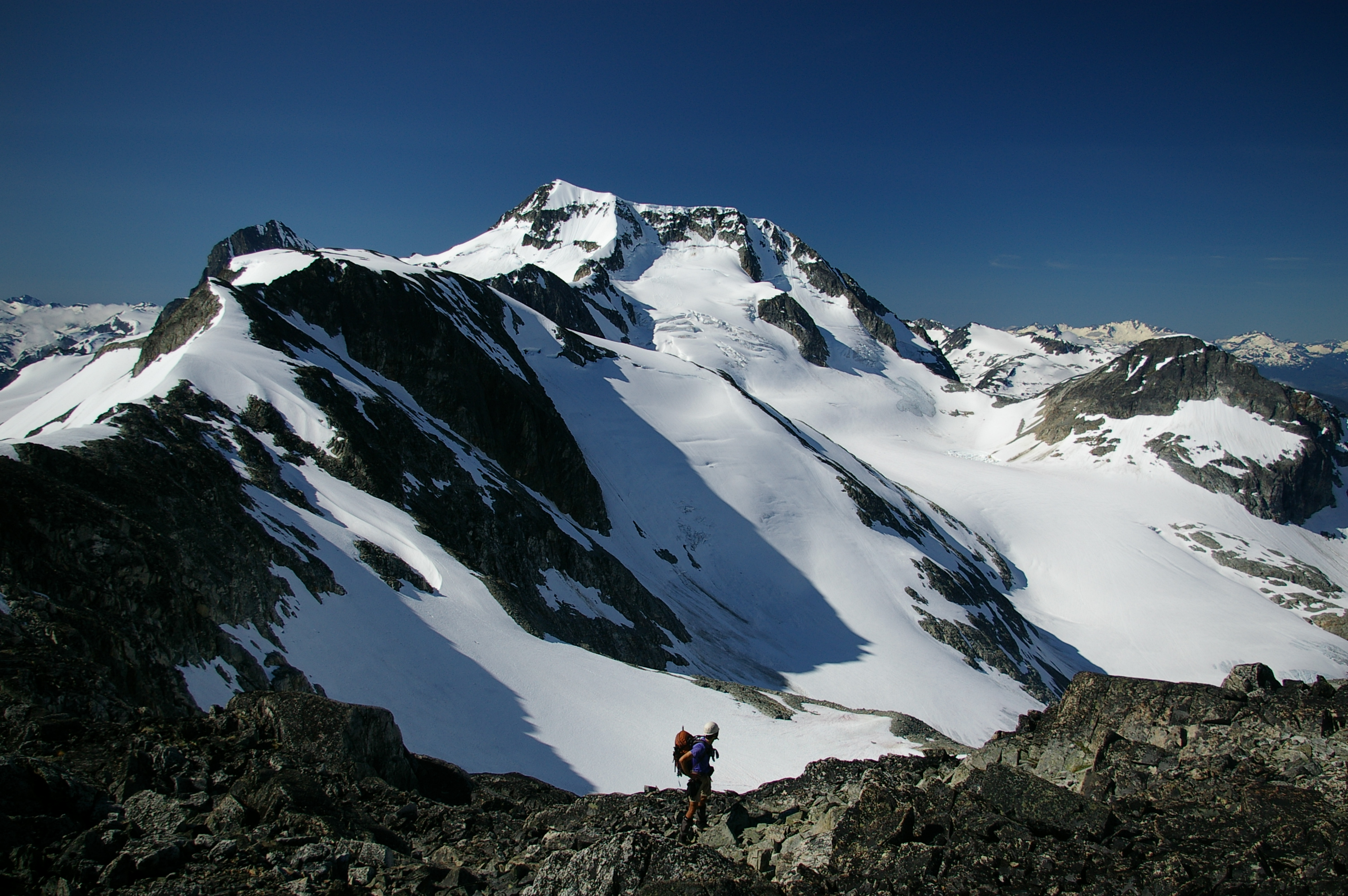
Wedge Mountain viewed en route to Mount Weart

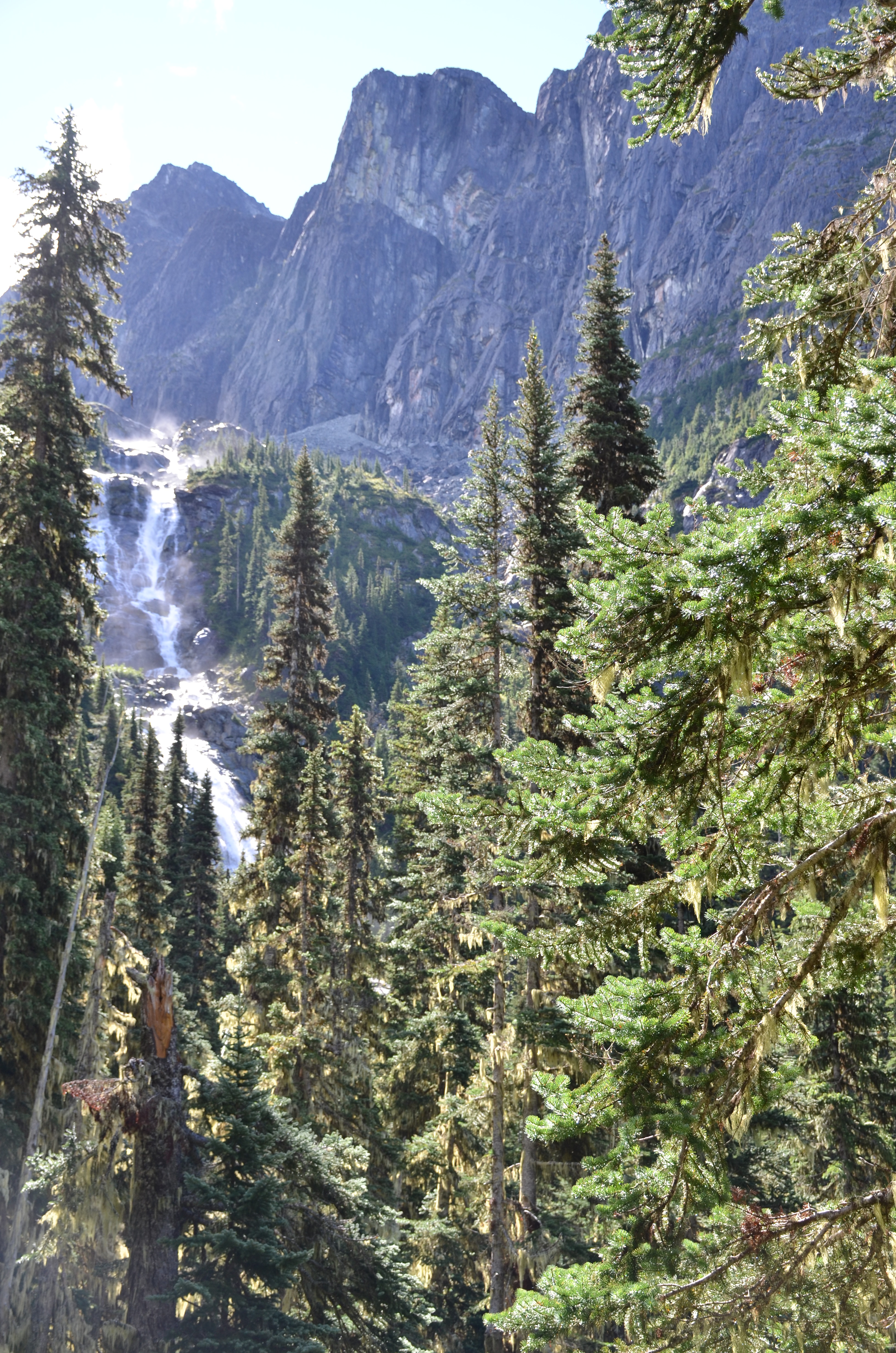
Wedgemount Falls seen from the hike to Wedgemount Lake

== See also ==
- Wedgemount Lake
- Mountain peaks of Canada
- Mountain peaks of North America
