= Corrie Peak =

Mountain in British Columbia, Canada

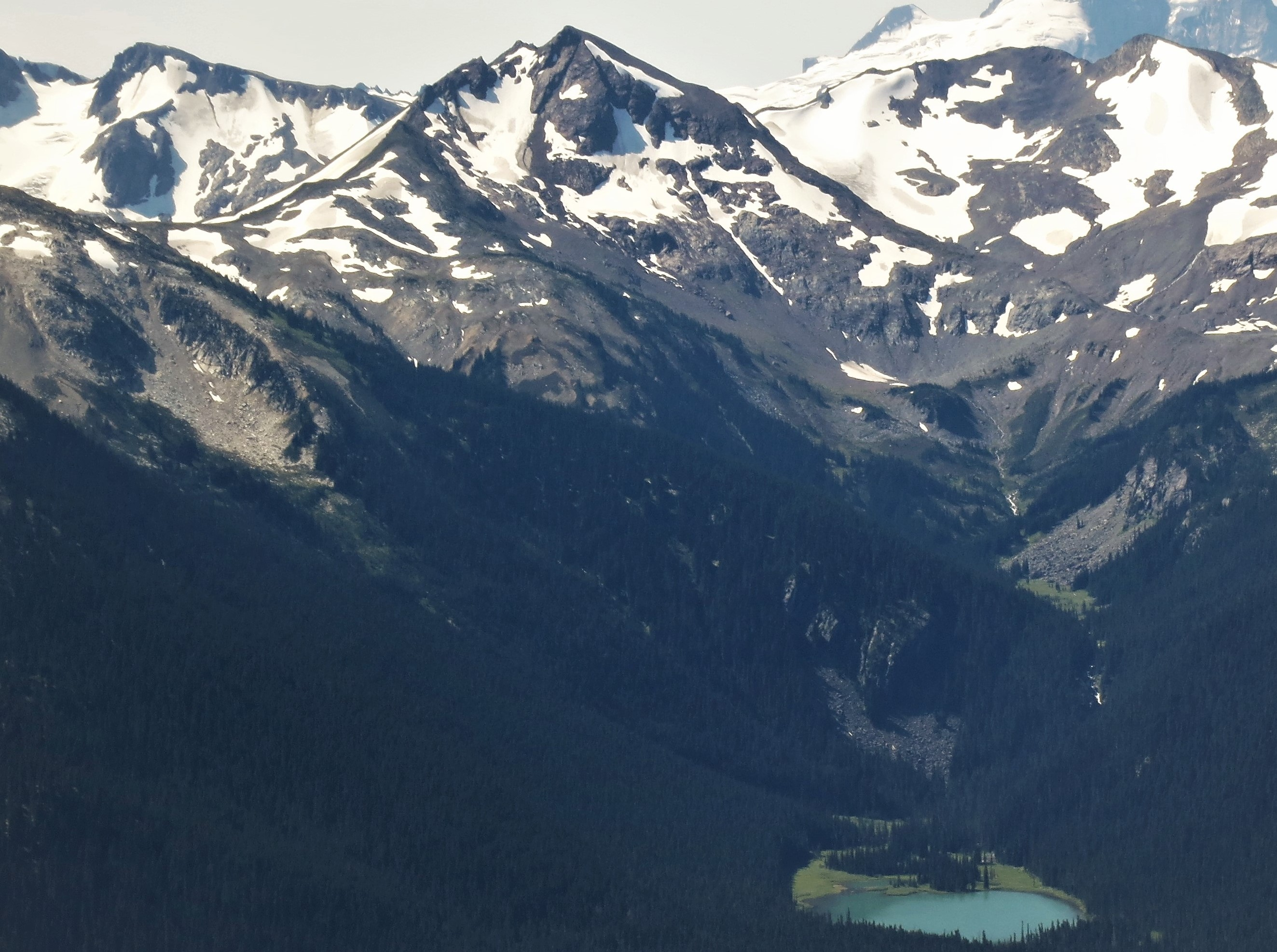
- North aspect, with Corrie Lake

Highest point
- Elevation: 2,263 m (7,425 ft)
- Prominence: 437 m (1,434 ft)
- Isolation: 2.92 km (1.81 mi)
- Listing: Mountains of British Columbia
- Coordinates: 49°59′09″N 122°57′18″W

Naming
- Etymology: Corrie (geology)

Geography
- Location within British Columbia Location within Canada
- Interactive map of Corrie Peak
- Country: Canada
- Province: British Columbia
- District: New Westminster Land District
- Protected area: Garibaldi Provincial Park
- Parent range: Garibaldi Ranges; Coast Mountains
- Topo map: NTS 92G15 Mamquam Mountain

Corrie Peak is a 2,263-metre (7,425-foot) summit in British Columbia, Canada.

== Description ==
Corrie Peak is located within Garibaldi Provincial Park on the southwest side of Cheakamus Lake, and is part of the Garibaldi Ranges of the Coast Mountains. It is situated 81 km (50 mi) north of Vancouver and 5 km (3 mi) north of Castle Towers Mountain. Precipitation runoff from the peak drains north to Cheakamus Lake which is within the Cheakamus River watershed. Topographic relief is significant as the summit rises 1,430 meters (4,692 feet) above the lake in 3 km (2 mi).

== Etymology ==
The peak was named in 1916 by Scottish-born botanist John Davidson. In Scotland "Corrie" refers to a steep-sided hollow on a mountain, which in other parts of the world is called a cirque. The mountain's toponym was officially adopted on September 2, 1930, by the Geographical Names Board of Canada as labelled on a 1928 topographic map of Garibaldi Park.

== Climate ==
Based on the Köppen climate classification, Corrie Peak is located in the marine west coast climate zone of western North America. Weather fronts originating in the Pacific Ocean travel east toward the Coast Mountains where they are forced upward by the range (Orographic lift), causing them to drop their moisture in the form of rain or snowfall. As a result, the Coast Mountains experience high precipitation, especially during the winter months in the form of snowfall. Winter temperatures can drop below −20 °C with wind chill factors below −30 °C. This climate supports the Corrie Glacier on the southwest slope.

== Gallery ==
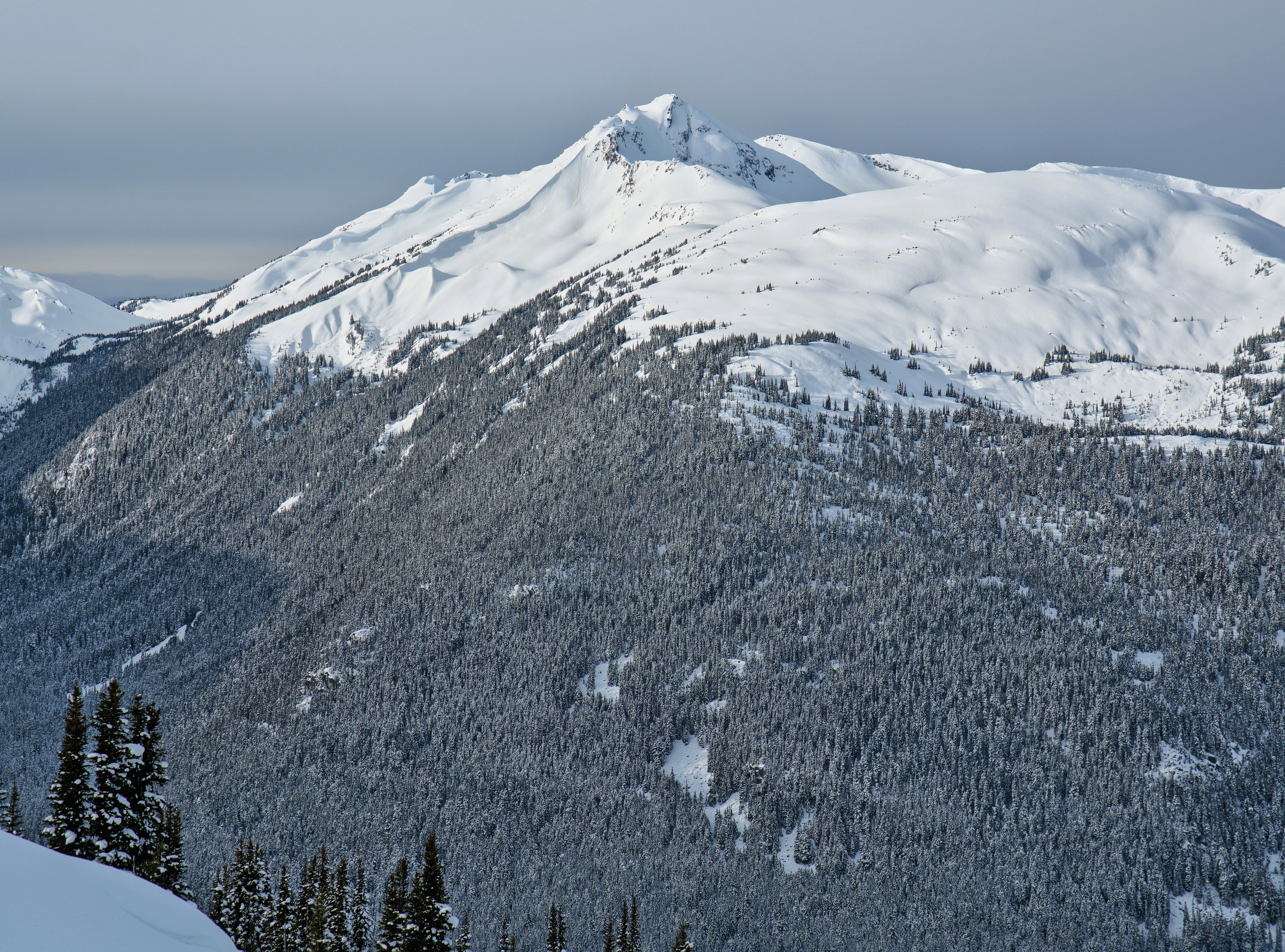
Corrie Peak in winter

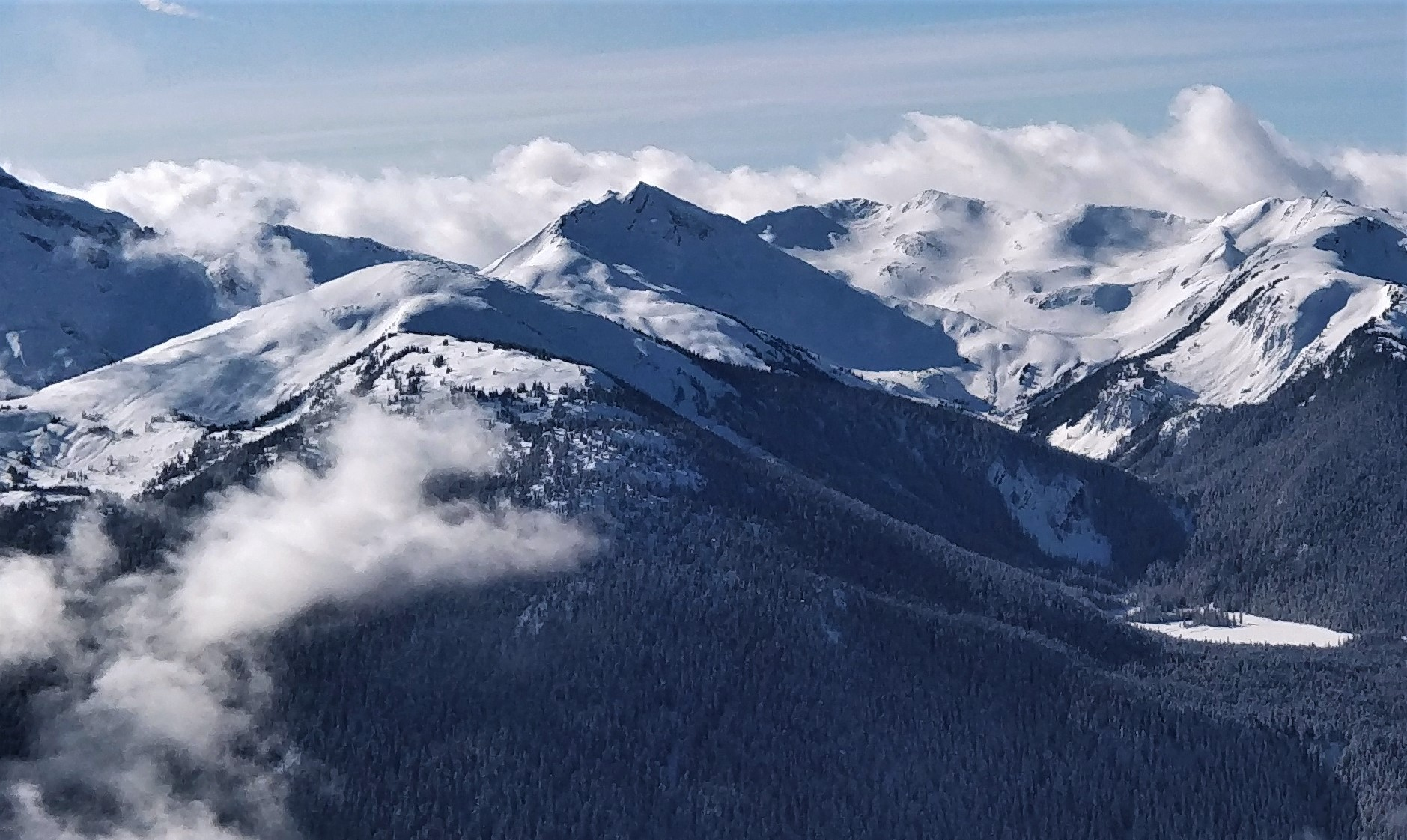
Corrie Peak in winter with Corrie Lake (right)

== See also ==
- Geography of British Columbia
