= Phyllis's Engine =

Mountain in the country of Canada

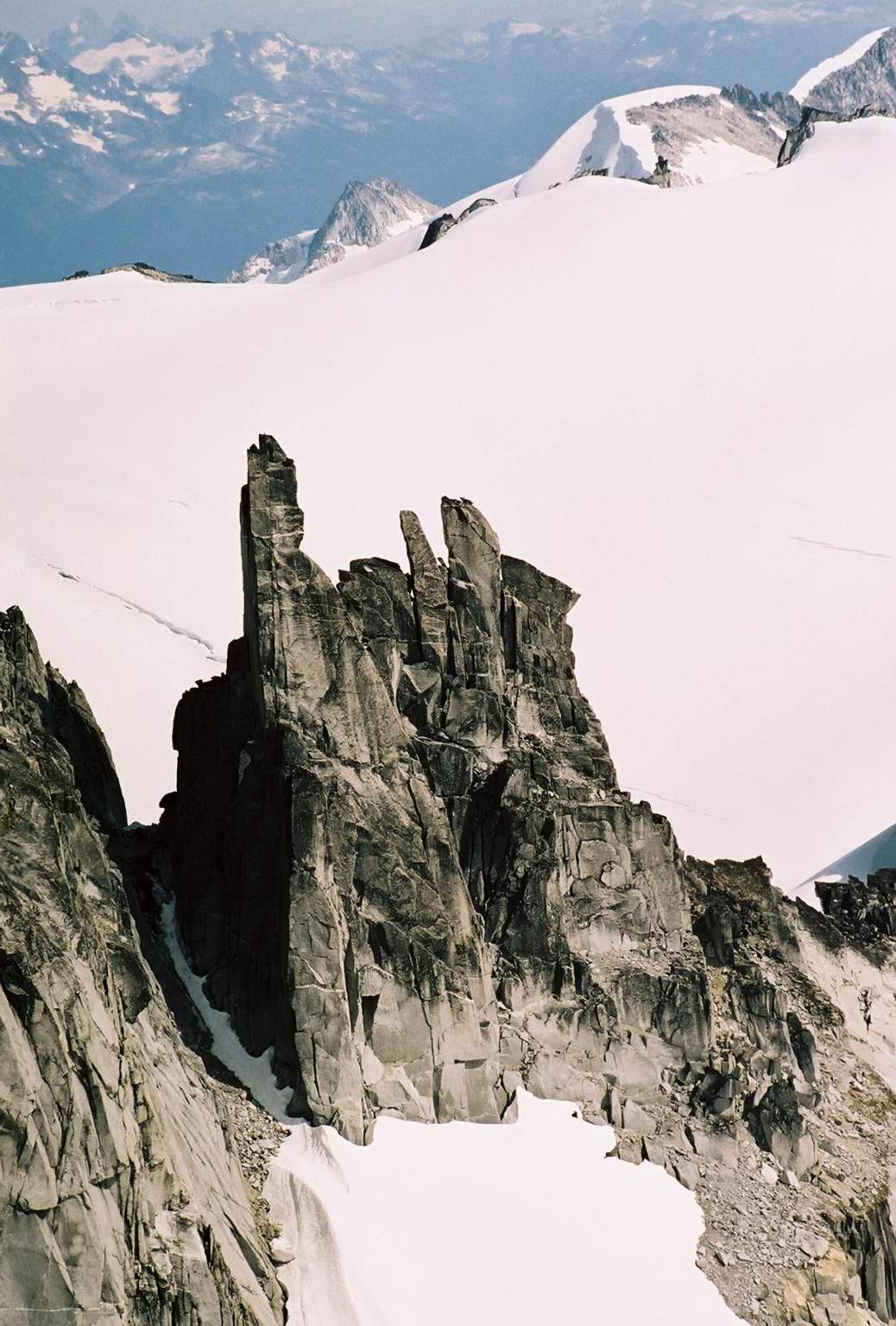
- North-northwest aspect

Highest point
- Elevation: 2,517 m (8,258 ft)
- Prominence: 21 m (69 ft)
- Parent peak: Castle Towers Mountain
- Isolation: 0.13 km (0.081 mi)
- Listing: Mountains of British Columbia
- Coordinates: 49°56′01″N 122°56′23″W

Geography
- Location within British Columbia Location within Canada
- Interactive map of Phyllis's Engine
- Country: Canada
- Province: British Columbia
- District: New Westminster Land District
- Protected area: Garibaldi Provincial Park
- Parent range: Garibaldi Ranges; Coast Mountains
- Topo map: NTS 92G15 Mamquam Mountain

Geology
- Rock type: granite

Climbing
- First ascent: 1966
- Easiest route: class 5.8 climbing

Phyllis's Engine is a 2,517-metre (8,258-foot) granite pinnacle located in British Columbia, Canada.

== Description ==
Phyllis's Engine is set within Garibaldi Provincial Park and is part of the Garibaldi Ranges of the Coast Mountains. It is situated 71 km (44 mi) north of Vancouver, 1.26 km (1 mi) north-northwest of Mount Carr, and 700 meters (2,300 feet) south of line parent Castle Towers Mountain. Precipitation runoff and glacial meltwater from the west side of the peak drains to Garibaldi Lake, and the eastern slope drains to Cheakamus Lake. Topographic relief is significant as the west aspect rises 1,040 meters (3,410 feet) in 3 kilometers (1.9 miles).

== History ==
The peak is named after Phyllis Dyke (Mrs. Edward Beltz), a pioneering British Columbia Mountaineering Club member who thought the arrangement of pinnacles and spires resembled a 19th-century steam locomotive, so her fellow climbers jokingly referred to the landform as "Phyllis's Engine", circa 1914. The name was formally submitted by Karl Ricker in 1978 as recommended by Neal Carter of the BC Mountaineering Club, and contrary to popular belief, the name does not refer to Phyllis Munday. The toponym was adopted as "Phyllis' Engine" on March 9, 1979, and officially changed to "Phyllis's Engine" on January 6, 1995, by the Geographical Names Board of Canada.

The first ascent of Phyllis's Engine was made in 1966 by F. Gratwhol and T. Kempter.

== Climate ==
Based on the Köppen climate classification, Phyllis's Engine is located in the marine west coast climate zone of western North America. Most weather fronts originate in the Pacific Ocean, and travel east toward the Coast Mountains where they are forced upward by the range (Orographic lift), causing them to drop their moisture in the form of rain or snowfall. As a result, the Coast Mountains experience high precipitation, especially during the winter months in the form of snowfall. Winter temperatures can drop below −20 °C with wind chill factors below −30 °C. This climate supports the Sphinx Glacier on the west slope and the Cheakamus Glacier on the east slope.

== Gallery ==
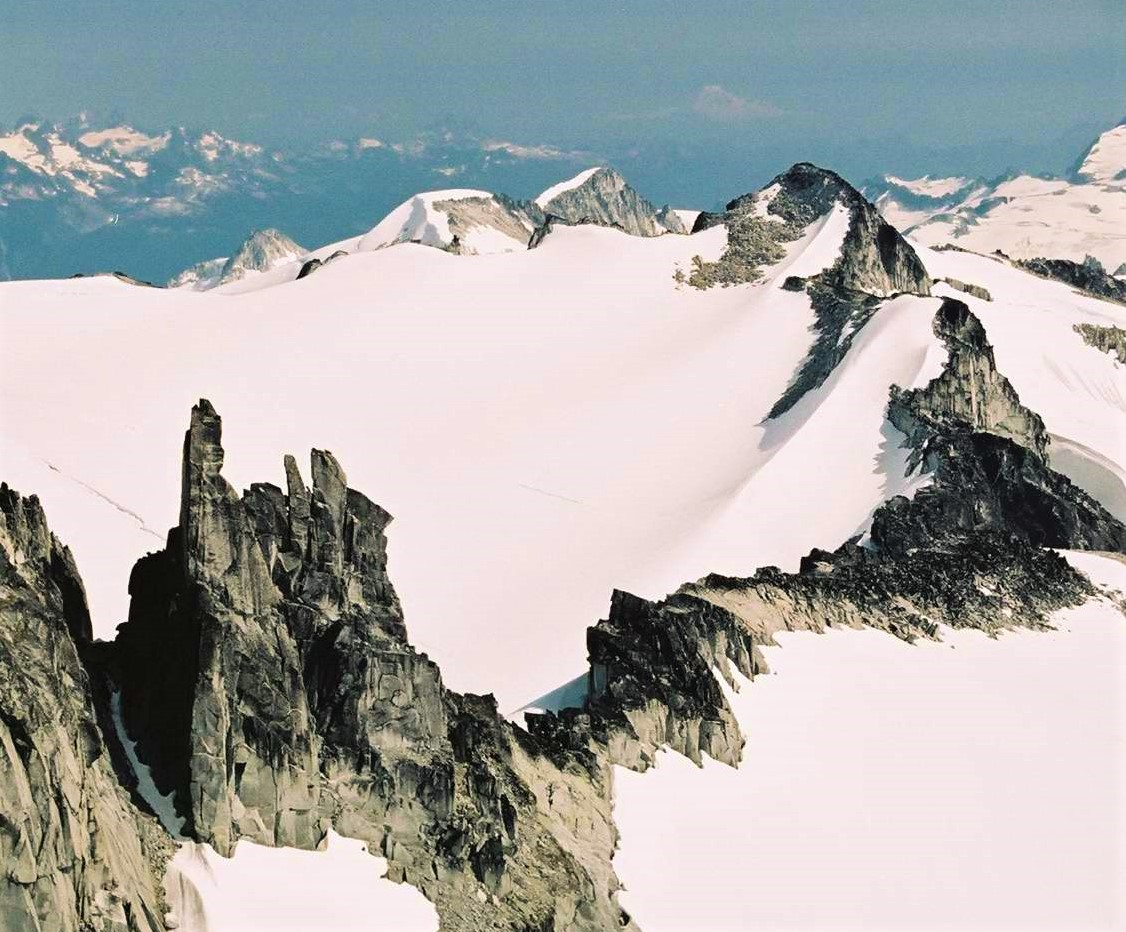
Phyllis's Engine (lower left) and Mount Carr (upper right)

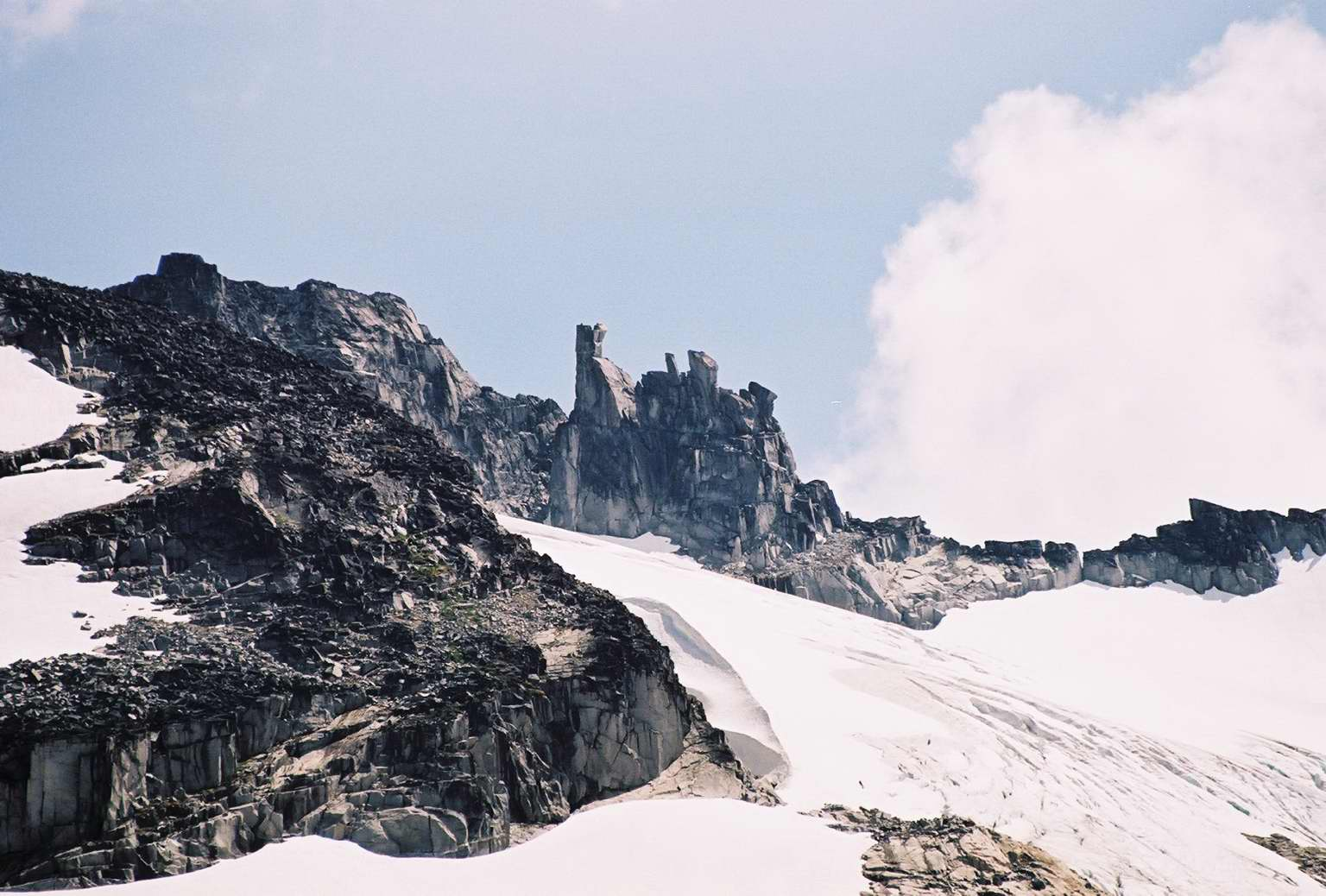

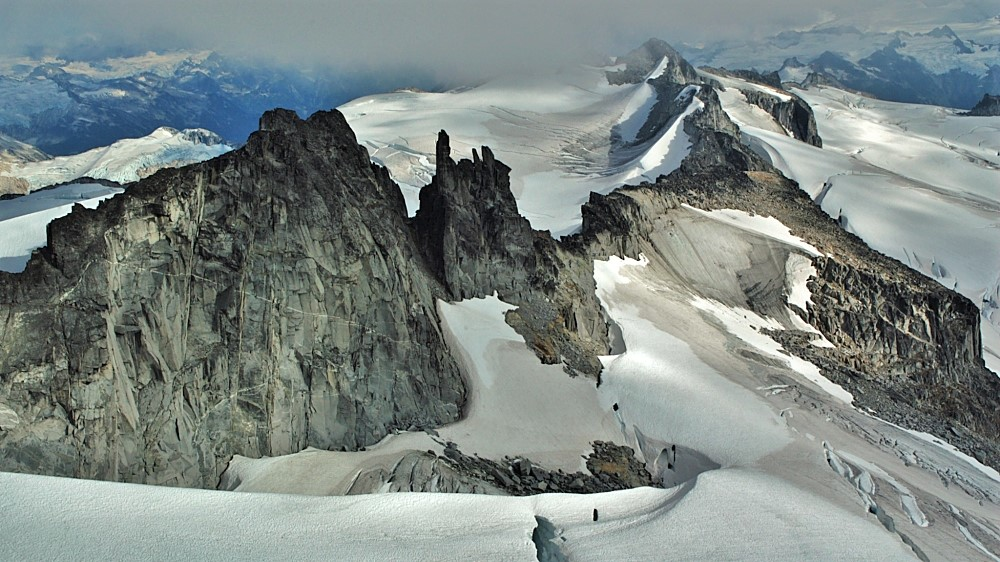
Phyllis's Engine, centered, viewed from west summit of Castle Towers Mountain.

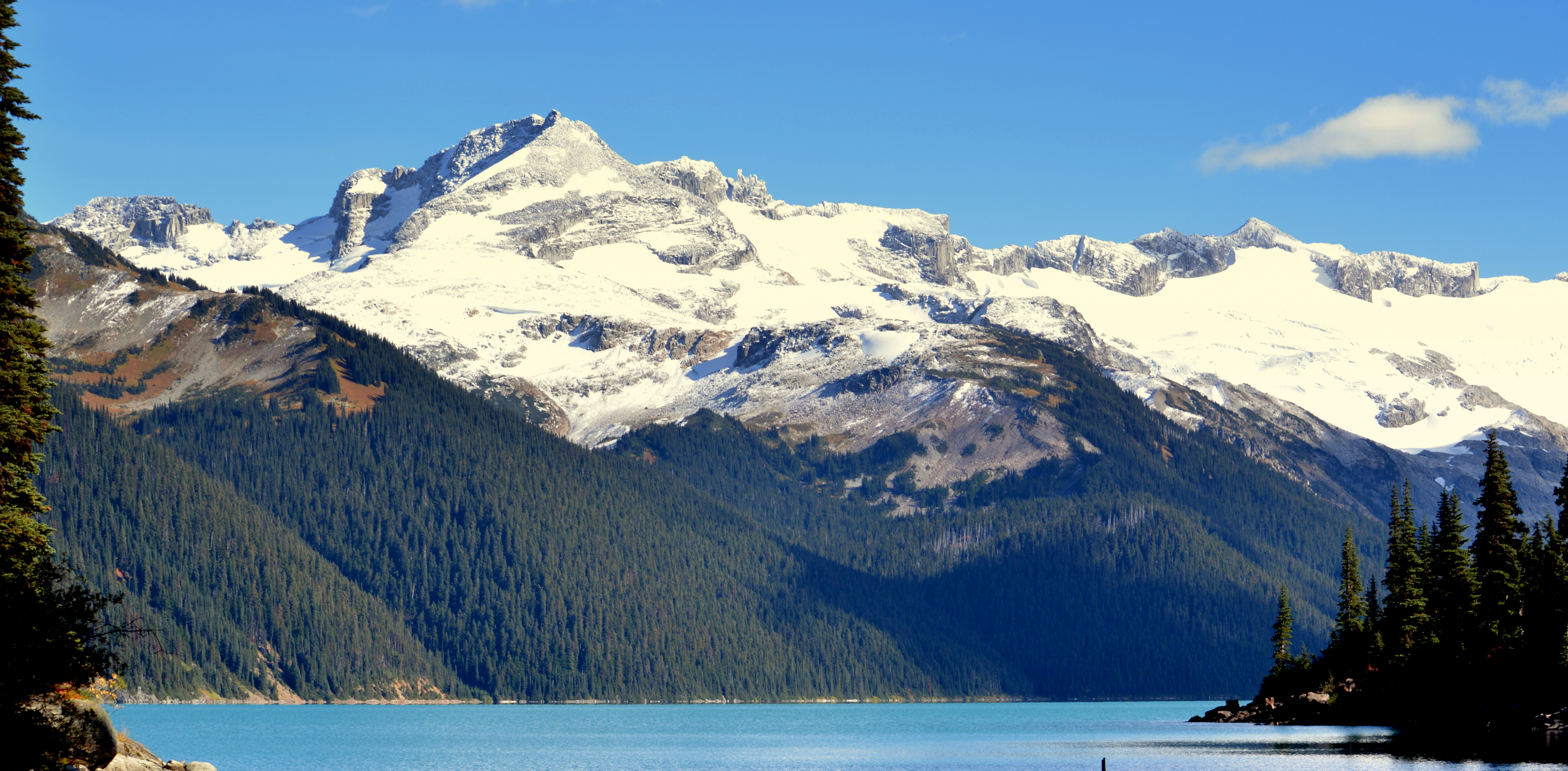
Castle Towers Mountain (left of center), Phyllis's Engine (center), Mt. Carr (right) viewed from Garibaldi Lake. Phyllis's Engine can be seen best when image is enlarged to maximum degree.

== See also ==
- Geography of British Columbia
