= Elfin Lakes =

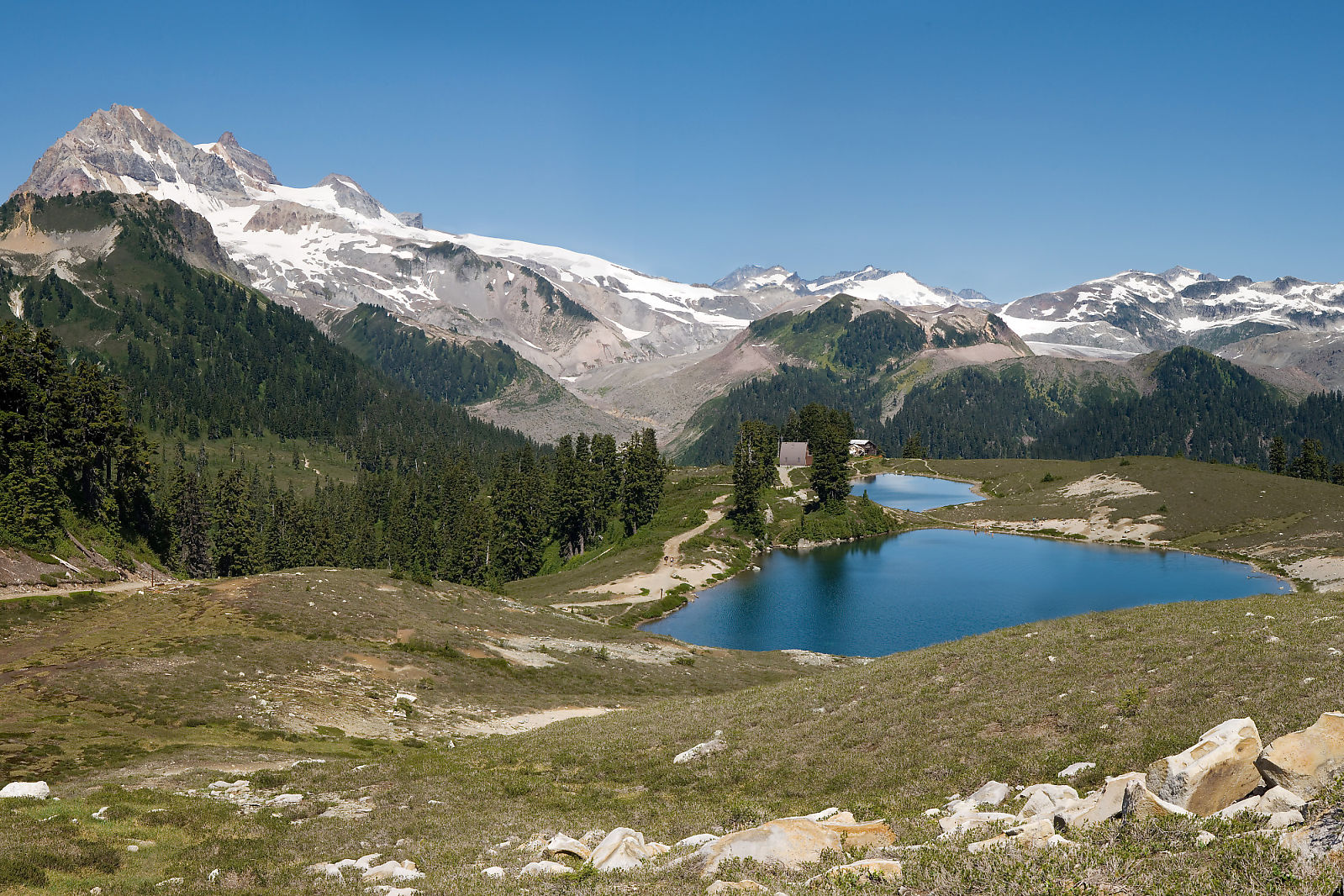
- The lakes from Paul Ridge.

- Location within British Columbia
- Location: Garibaldi Provincial Park, British Columbia near Squamish, British Columbia
- Coordinates: 49°47′08″N 122°59′20″W
- Type: glacial lake
- Primary inflows: none
- Primary outflows: none
- Basin countries: Canada
- Surface elevation: 1,600 metres (5,200 ft)

Elfin Lakes are two lakes in Garibaldi Provincial Park that are popular for hiking, snowshoeing, skiing, and mountain bicycling trail located east of Squamish, British Columbia, Canada.

== History ==
The name was adopted in 1978 when it was identified in a pamphlet for the local lodge. However, a 1946 letter from W.H. Matthews, a Vancouver City Archivist notes that the lakes were once called Crystal Lakes but were never found on any maps.

The area has always been a popular destination for hikers and skiers since the creation of the park in the 1927. Then a local lodge was built in the early 1940s by Joan Mathews, Ottar Brandvold, and his brother Emil and was called the Diamond Head Chalet, but it is now unused and decaying. It attracted many hikers and backcountry skiers. Eventually the owners retired, and ownership was transferred to BC Parks. They chose to not maintain it and built the new Elfin Lakes shelter a few metres south. However, the road that was built is still used as a trail and service road. A moving film made by the Brandvolds showcases Garibaldi Park and the Diamond Head Chalet.

== Recreation ==
All recreational activities in the area are governed by the regulations of Garibaldi Provincial Park. Primary access to the lake is via an 11 km (5.5 mi) long trail, which gains approximately 600 metres (2,000 ft) of elevation from the trailhead. There are campgrounds and an overnight shelter at the lakes, Elfin Lakes Hut, and campgrounds and a day-use shelter or a winter overnight shelter in Red Heather Meadows. During winter, the lake is typically frozen from late December to late April. Much of the trail up is on a rarely used forest service road and has an approximate grade of 5.5%. Approximately half of the trail is in forest, while the remaining half is in alpine meadows with clear views of the surrounding mountains. There are separate trails for mountain bicycling, hiking, and winter use. Hiking trails continue past Elfin Lakes towards Opal Cone, Mamquam Lake, Columnar Peak, The Gargoyles, and Atwell Peak. It is also possible to travel to Mount Garibaldi and Diamond Head in the winter. Swimming is permitted in the top lake, and the lower lake is reserved for drinking water only.

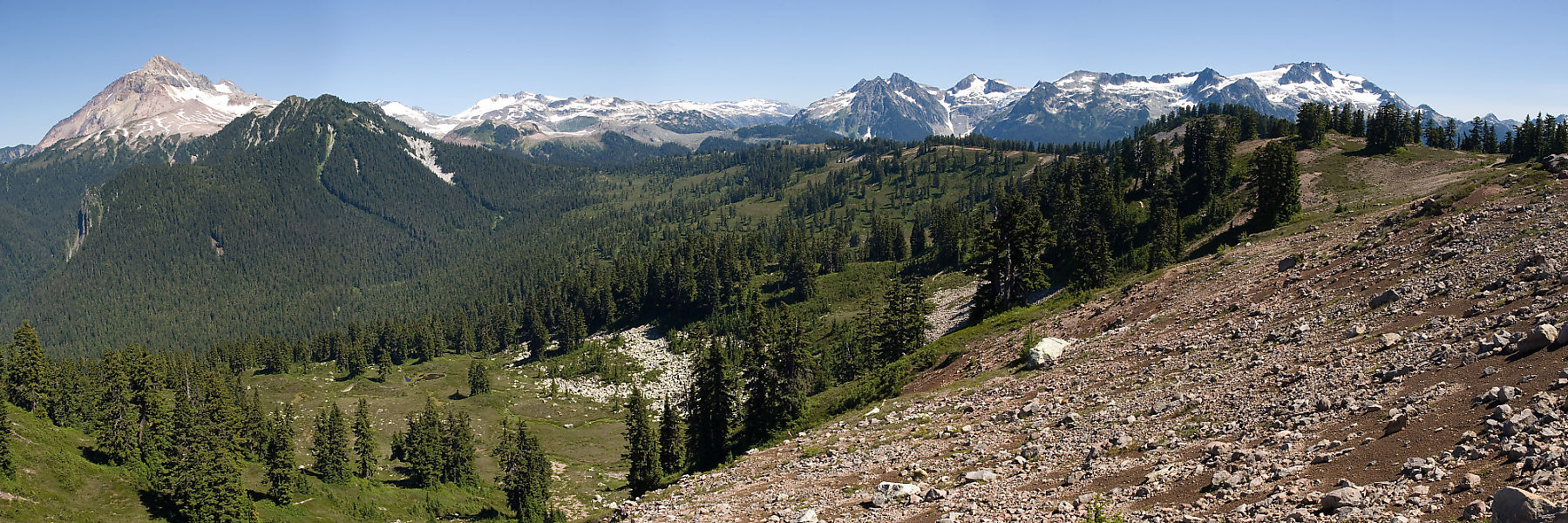
The view from Paul Ridge toward Elfin Lakes. Atwell Peak is prominently visible.

== See also ==
- List of lakes of British Columbia
- Garibaldi Lake
