= Mamquam River =

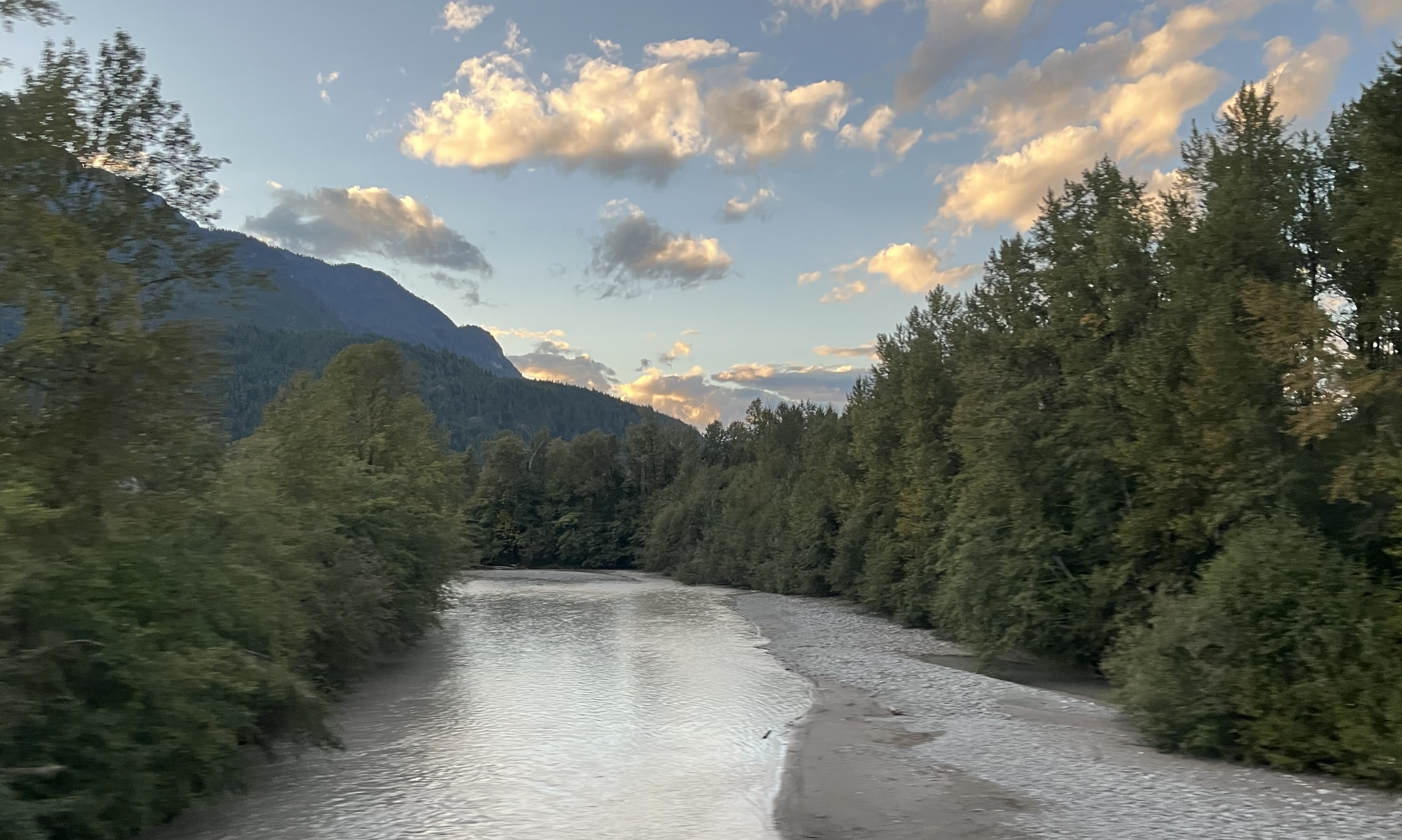

Location
- Country: Canada
- Province: British Columbia
- District: New Westminster Land District
- City: Squamish

Physical characteristics
- Source: Mamquam Pass
  - location: Garibaldi Ranges, Pacific Ranges, Coast Mountains
  - coordinates: 49°37′27″N 122°48′36″W
  - elevation: 1,600 m (5,200 ft)
- Mouth: Squamish River
  - location: Squamish
  - coordinates: 49°44′04″N 123°08′53″W
  - elevation: 14.6 m (48 ft)

Basin features
- Tributaries
  - left: Raffuse Creek
  - right: Crawford Creek, Martin Creek (British Columbia), Skookum Creek, Ring Creek, Mashiter Creek

The Mamquam River is a c.35 km (c. 21 mi) tributary of the Squamish River.

== Course ==
The Mamquam River originates at Mamquam Pass and starts off by flowing northwest for about 7.5 km. Shortly below its source, the river picks up the waters of the stream draining November Lake. The river, after about 7.5 km, turns north and continues in that direction for about 6.9 km to its confluence with its second named tributary, Martin Creek. At the mouth of Martin Creek, the river turns southwest for about 5.4 km to the mouth of Skookum Creek. At the mouth of Skookum Creek, the river turns west and flows that way for about 12 km all the way to its confluence with the Squamish River in Squamish. Its other main tributaries, Ring and Mashiter Creeks, enter near the river's mouth.

== Tributaries ==
The Mamquam River has three main tributaries. They are:

1. Skookum Creek: Skookum Creek flows southwest from remote Mamquam Lake within Garibaldi Provincial Park and enters the Mamquam about 12 km above its mouth. It is said to have several large, high volume waterfalls near its confluence with the Mamquam.

2. Ring Creek: Beginning at the head of the Diamond Glacier within Garibaldi Park, Ring Creek flows south then west to its confluence with the Mamquam about 4.2 km above its mouth. The creek is very swift, cold, silty and fast flowing.

3. Mashiter Creek: Flowing west then east from its source on Columnar Peak, Mashiter Creek is the Mamquams final tributary, entering the Mamquam about 2.7 km above its mouth near Garibaldi Estates. It is popular with kayakers, as it has several rapids and waterfalls along its course.

== Access ==
The Mamquam River is accessed by the Mamquam River Forest Service Road. This FSR runs through Raffuse Creek Recreational Area and offers many opportunities for rock climbing, fishing, hiking, and camping. Watersprite Lake can be accessed via this road, which offers first-come, first-served backcountry camp sites, as well as the Watersprite Lake Hut, which requires a reservation and hut access code.

== See also ==
- List of rivers of British Columbia
- Mamquam Mountain
- Mamquam Icefield
