= Garibaldi Névé =

Snowfield in British Columbia, Canada

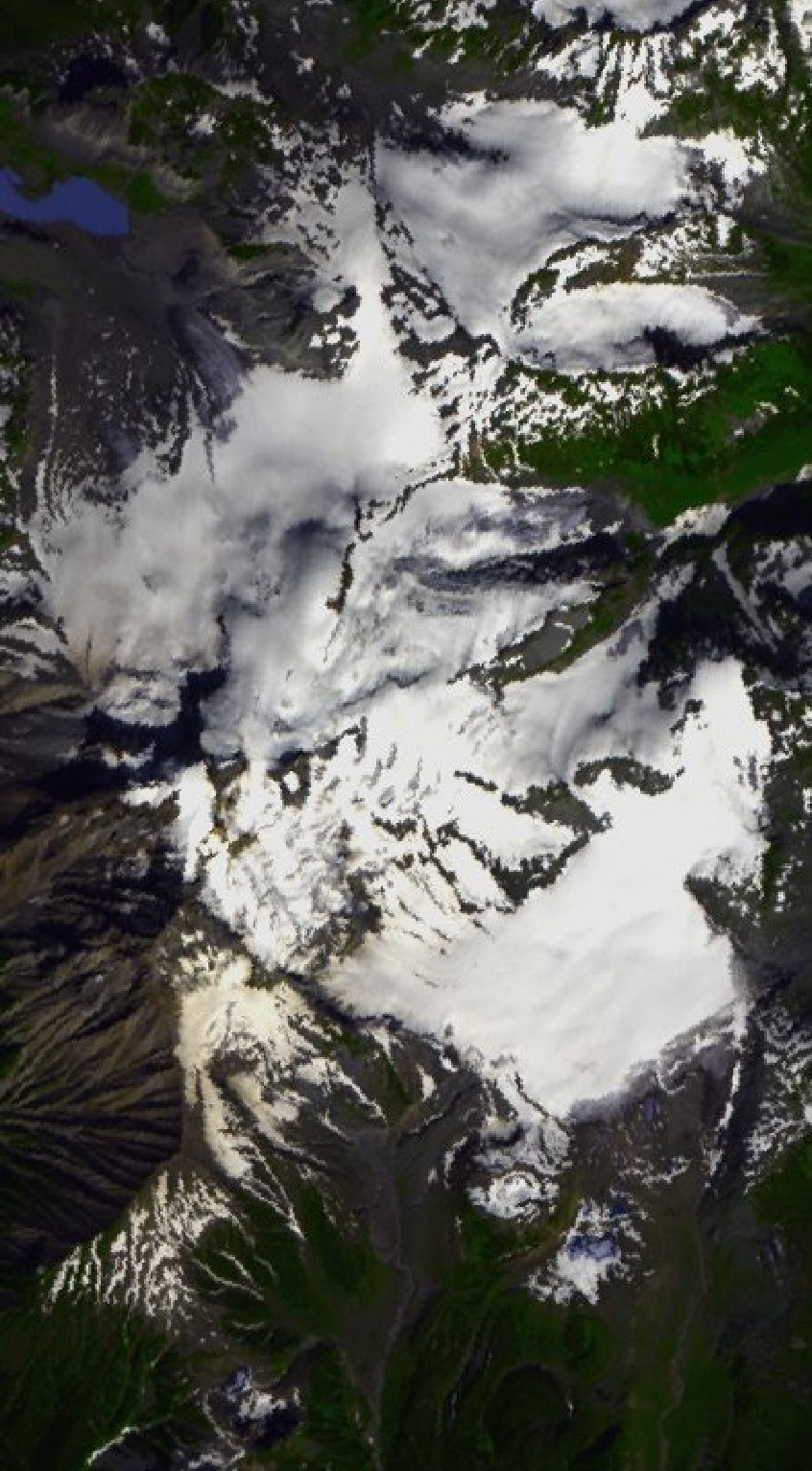
- Satellite view of the Garibaldi Névé

- Location within British Columbia
- Interactive map of Garibaldi Névé
- Location: British Columbia, Canada
- Coordinates: 49°51′11″N 122°59′28″W
- Area: 30 km^{2} (12 sq mi)

The Garibaldi Névé is a snowfield in the Pacific Ranges of the Coast Mountains in southwestern British Columbia, Canada, located on the north and east sides of Mount Garibaldi in New Westminster Land District. The névé along with its outlet glaciers have a combined area of about 30 square kilometres (12 square miles).

== Glaciers ==
The following glaciers are part of the Garibaldi Névé:

- Garibaldi Glacier
- North Pitt Glacier
- South Pitt Glacier
- Lava Glacier
- Sentinel Glacier
- Warren Glacier
- Bishop Glacier
- Phoenix Glacier
- Pike Glacier

== Accessibility ==
Mamquam Road, 4 kilometres (2.5 miles) north of downtown Squamish, provides access to Mount Garibaldi from Highway 99. This easterly paved road traverses the Squamish Golf and Country Club and then heads north through Quest University. Mamquam Road then extends northeast and becomes Garibaldi Park Road. At the end of Garibaldi Park Road is the Diamond Head parking lot, which lies 16 kilometres (9.9 miles) from Highway 99 at an elevation of 914 metres (2,999 feet). The 11-kilometre-long (6.8-mile) Diamond Head hiking trail commences from the parking lot to the Elfin Lakes where Opal Cone, Columnar Peak, The Gargoyles and Mamquam Icefield can be viewed. A 6.5-kilometre-long (4.0-mile) hiking trail extending from the Elfin Lakes leads down to Ring Creek then climbs Opal Cone where Mamquam Lake and the Garibaldi Névé can be viewed from its summit. The route to the Garibaldi Névé is marked by cairns.

== See also ==
- List of glaciers in Canada
