= Misty Icefield =

Ice field in British Columbia, Canada

Coordinates: 49°48′13″N 122°37′45″W

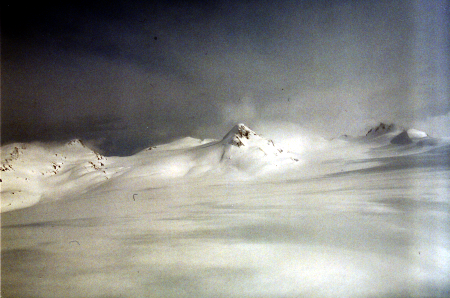
Misty Icefield showing Stave Peak

The Misty Icefield (sometimes referred to as the Misty Icefields) is a high glaciated plateau in the Garibaldi Ranges of the Pacific Ranges of the Coast Mountains. It is located in the eastern part of Garibaldi Provincial Park and the northern portion of Golden Ears Provincial Park. The Misty Icefield was mapped and named in 1955, and rarely visited since, mainly due to its remote location. The area includes the Stave Glacier, and the Snowcap Glacier

The area is difficult to get to on foot, taking 3–5 days on skis, and there are few documented visits to the area.

== See also ==
- List of glaciers
