= Bastion Range =

Mountain range in British Columbia, Canada

- Location within British Columbia

Geography
- Country: Canada
- Region: British Columbia
- Range coordinates: 50°12′N 122°34′W
- Parent range: Garibaldi Ranges

The Bastion Range is a small mountain range at the northeastern corner of Garibaldi Provincial Park in the Garibaldi Ranges of the Pacific Ranges of the Coast Mountains in southwestern British Columbia, Canada. Overlooking Lillooet Lake, it has an area of 50 km^{2}.

== See also ==
- List of mountain ranges
