= Ring Creek =

Coordinates: 49°43′00″N 123°06′00″W

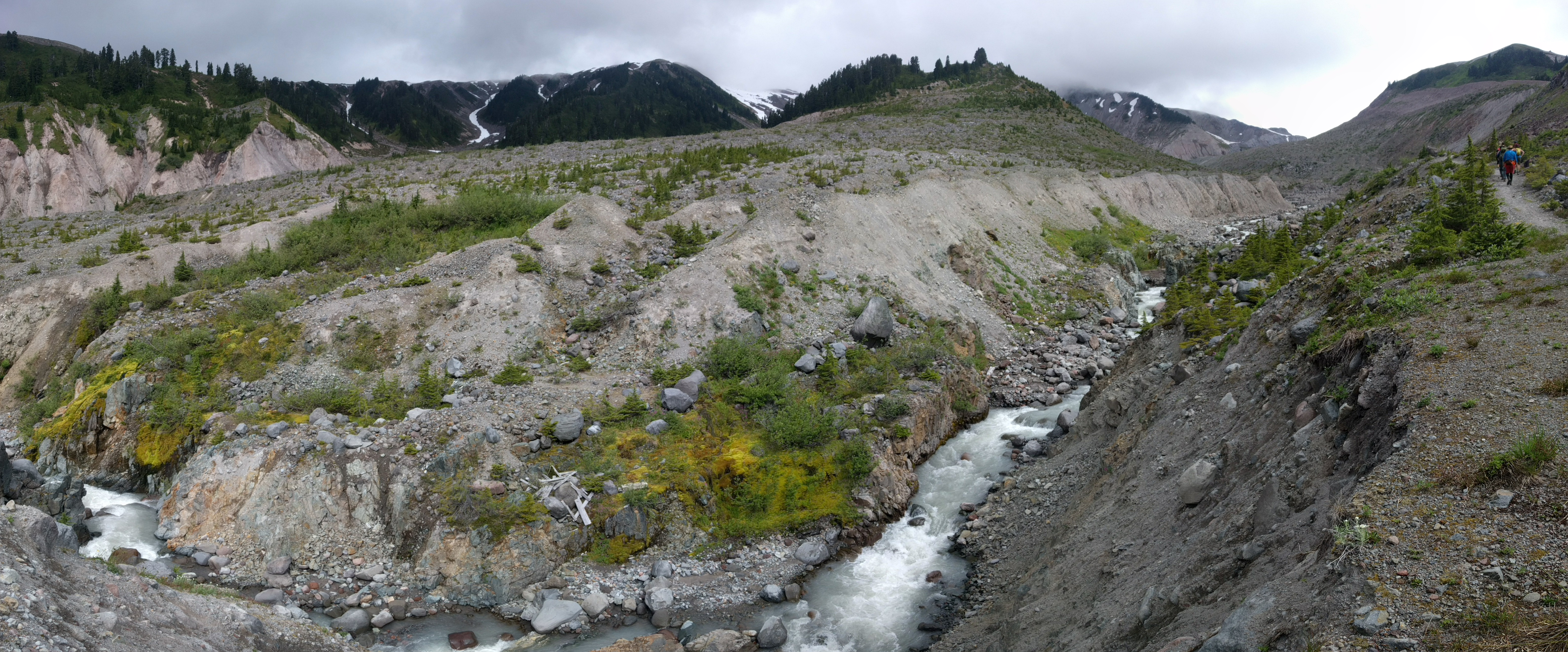
Ring Creek near Opal Cone

Ring Creek is a creek in southwestern British Columbia, Canada. It flows west and southwest into the Mamquam River, and east of the Squamish River. The community of Ring Creek is located 6 km East of Quest University on the Garibaldi park Road, at an elevation of approximately 2000 feet above sea level. This community is close to Squamish but is outside municipal boundaries, and falls within the SLRD (Squamish Lillooet Regional District). There are permanent residents as well as seasonal dwellers. Population ranges from 40 to 60 persons depending on time of year. This community is fully off grid and has no centrally supplied water, sewer, electricity, garbage collection, or cable services. The origin of the community began with logging in the area. Once road access was established, recreational users began accessing Garibaldi Park, and some unauthorized cabins were constructed in the area. In the late sixties the government surveyed the current lots and offered crown leases to squatters if certain conditions were met, and annual lease fees were paid. As governments changed, leases were offered up for sale as freehold properties. As of this time most lots have been converted to freehold, although over the past 35 years some lots have reverted to the crown, and a few remain crown leases. The community is well known to the mountain biking community as it sits among and near some of the best known, and most widely used mountain bike trails in the sea to Sky Corridor.

== See also ==
- List of rivers of British Columbia
