= Atwell Peak =

Mountain in British Columbia, Canada

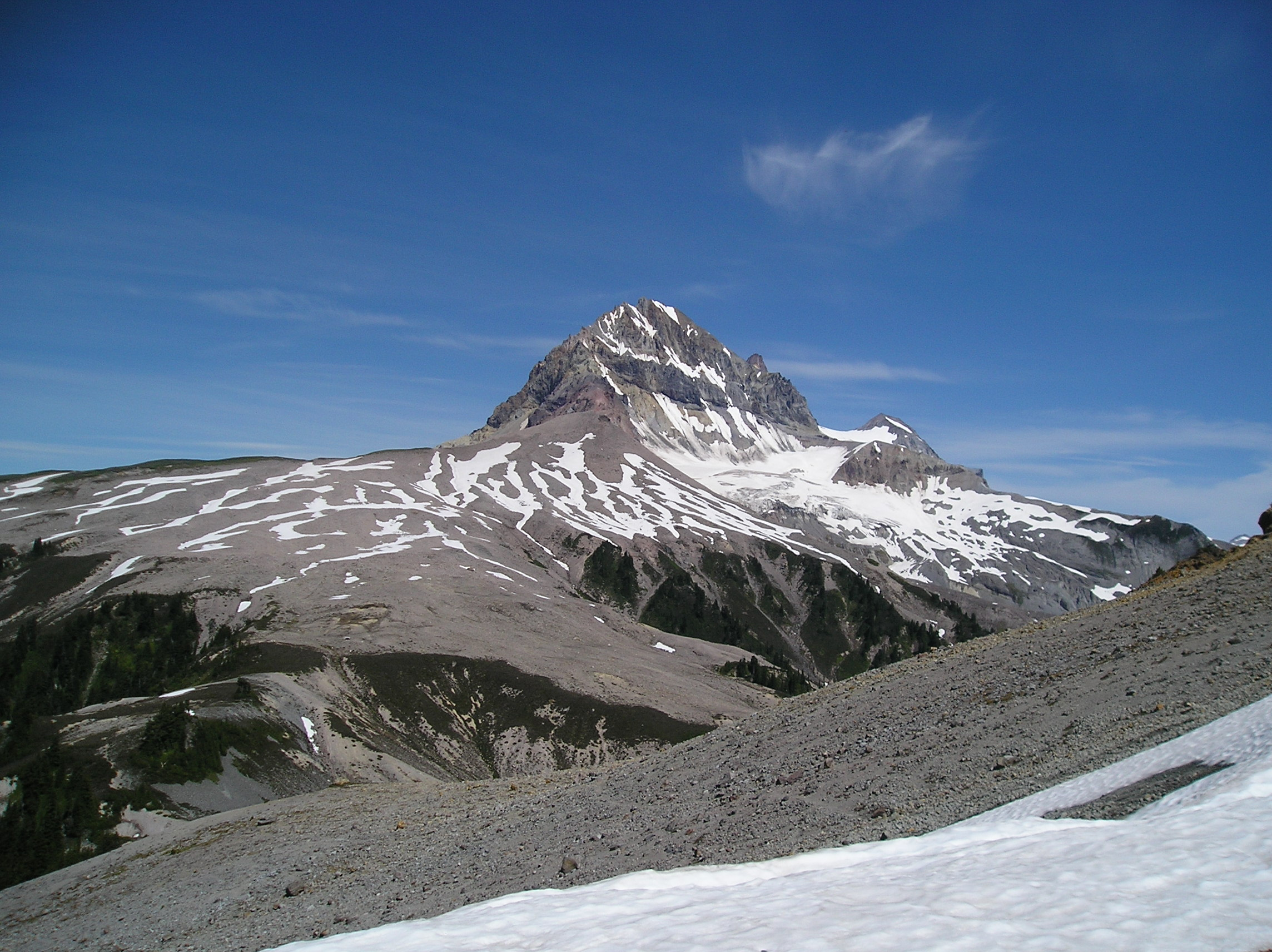
- Atwell Peak

Highest point
- Elevation: 2,655 m (8,711 ft)
- Prominence: 125 m (410 ft)
- Listing: List of volcanoes in Canada List of Cascade volcanoes
- Coordinates: 49°50′28″N 123°00′33″W

Geography
- Location within British Columbia
- Interactive map of Atwell Peak
- Location: British Columbia, Canada
- District: New Westminster Land District
- Parent range: Garibaldi Ranges
- Topo map: NTS 92G14 Cheakamus River

Geology
- Rock age: Pleistocene
- Mountain type: Lava dome
- Volcanic arc: Canadian Cascade Arc
- Volcanic belt: Garibaldi Volcanic Belt
- Last eruption: Pleistocene

Climbing
- First ascent: 1911 A. Armistead; B. Darling; J. Davies; F. Hewton; A. Morkill

Atwell Peak is a dramatic pyramid-shaped volcanic peak located at the southern edge of Mount Garibaldi, British Columbia, Canada. Atwell Peak was the source of many pyroclastic flows during Garibaldi's development. Frequent landslides on its west face drops steeply into the Cheekye River. Atwell Peak is often mistakenly called Mount Garibaldi when viewed from Squamish, since the main peak is hidden. The peak is usually climbed during winter or early spring when the rock is frozen because it is very loose and rotten. Atwell Peak contains three ridges, the north, east, and south. The two most visible routes are the north and south ridges.

Atwell Peak is part of the Garibaldi Massif which is an eroded stratovolcano formed during the last ice age. The volcano is also part of the Garibaldi Volcanic Belt which is a segment of the Canadian Cascade Arc, but it is not within the geographic boundary of the Cascade Range. It is located in the Garibaldi Ranges of the Pacific Ranges.

== Ridges ==
Atwell Peak consists of three ridges, the north, east, and south. The east ridge connects with the north ridge about 100 horizontal metres north of the summit. All ridges, with the possible exception of the upper east ridge, are sharp and heavily corniced in winter and spring. The north ridge is the shortest climbing route. Several gullies on the southeast face offer moderate routes that eventually join one of the three ridges. The northeast face is the shortest of the peak's faces but has many bergschrunds.

== Glaciers and icefield ==
To the east of Atwell Peak lies the Garibaldi Névé ice field, which is a popular objective with the ski touring crowd. Two pocket glaciers lie right below the east side of the peak, the Diamond Glacier to the southeast and the upper Bishop Glacier to the northeast. Straight north of Atwell toward Mount Garibaldi lies a small, high-elevation ice cap called the Cheekye Glacier.

== Gallery ==
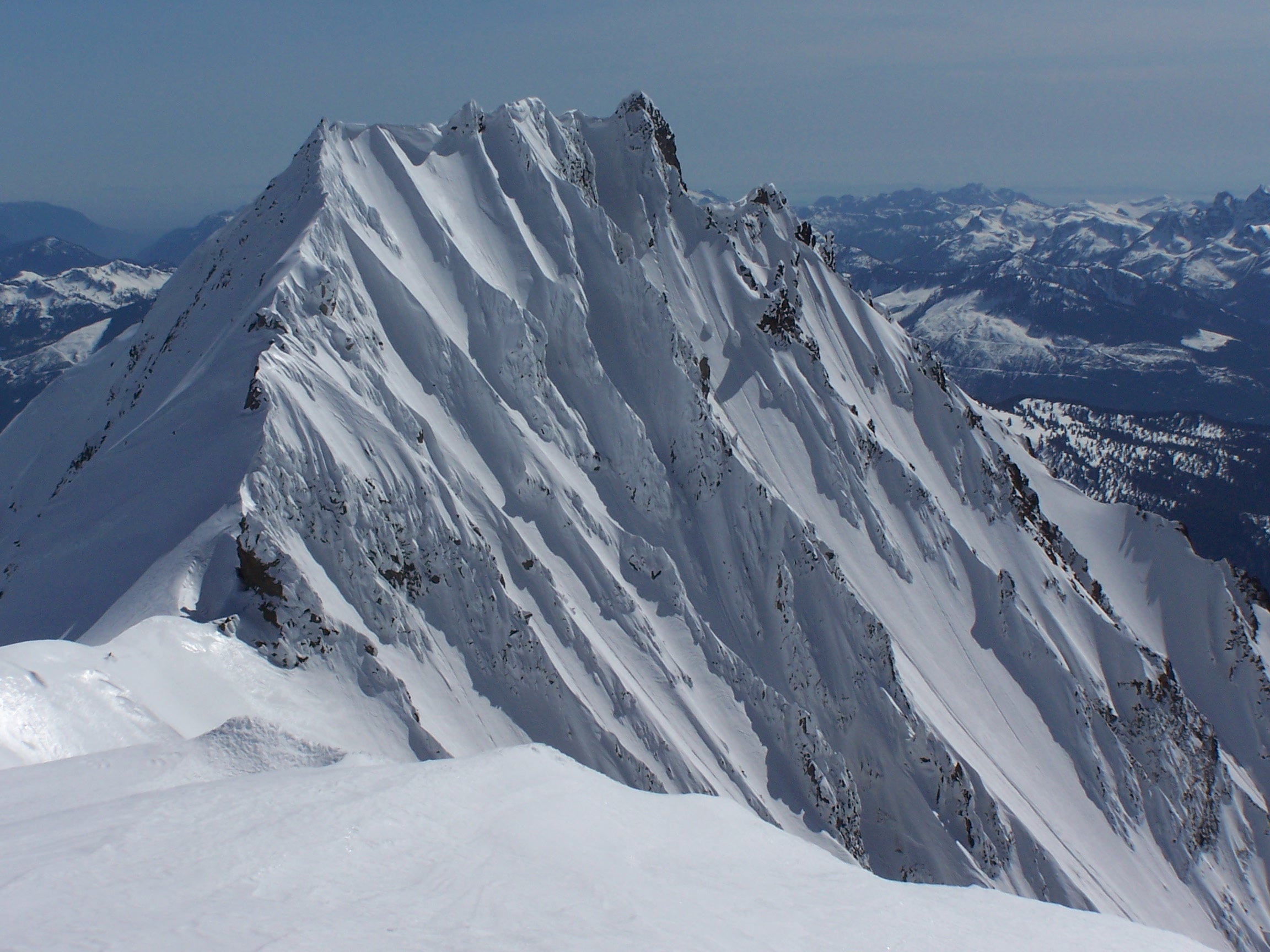
Atwell from Garibaldi

== See also ==
- List of volcanoes in Canada
- Cascade Volcanoes
- Volcanism of Canada
- Volcanism of Western Canada
