= The Gargoyles =

Mountain peaks in British Columbia, Canada

- Lava Peaks
- Location within British Columbia
- Interactive map of The Gargoyles

Highest point
- Elevation: 1,823 m (5,981 ft)
- Coordinates: 49°48′20″N 122°59′51″W

Geography
- Country: Canada
- Province: British Columbia
- District: New Westminster Land District
- Protected area: Garibaldi Provincial Park
- Parent range: Garibaldi Ranges
- Topo map: NTS 92G15 Mamquam Mountain

The Gargoyles are two mountain peaks in the Garibaldi Ranges of the Pacific Ranges in southwestern British Columbia, Canada. The highest peak has an elevation of 1,823 m (5,981 ft) whereas the lowest peak has an elevation of 1,816 m (5,958 ft). A deeply eroded obsidian dome remnant at The Gargoyles contains 77% silica content and is the only Quaternary high-silica rhyolite identified in the Cascade Volcanic Arc north of the Three Sisters. The age of this rhyolite is poorly known.

The Gargoyles were originally mapped as the Lava Peaks by William Henry Mathews in 1958. The current name was suggested and adopted in 1978. Another name applied to The Gargoyles is Lava Peak.
