= Diamond Glacier =

Diamond Glacier may refer to:

- Diamond Glacier (Antarctica)
- Diamond Glacier (British Columbia)
- Diamond Glacier (Tanzania) on the summit of Mount Kilimanjaro
