= Diamond Head (British Columbia) =

Mountain peak in British Columbia, Canada

- Location within British Columbia
- Interactive map of Diamond Head

Highest point
- Elevation: 2,056 m (6,745 ft)
- Coordinates: 49°49′32″N 123°00′26″W

Geography
- Country: Canada
- Province: British Columbia
- District: New Westminster Land District
- Protected area: Garibaldi Provincial Park
- Parent range: Garibaldi Ranges
- Topo map: NTS 92G14 Cheakamus River

Diamond Head is a subsidiary peak of Mount Garibaldi in southwestern British Columbia, Canada. It is located west of Mamquam Lake on the south side of Mount Garibaldi in Garibaldi Provincial Park. It was possibly named by Canadian volcanologist William Henry Mathews for its resemblance to Diamond Head in Hawaii. The peak consists of tuff breccia ranging in size from dust to enormous blocks.
