= Opal Cone =

Mountain in British Columbia, Canada

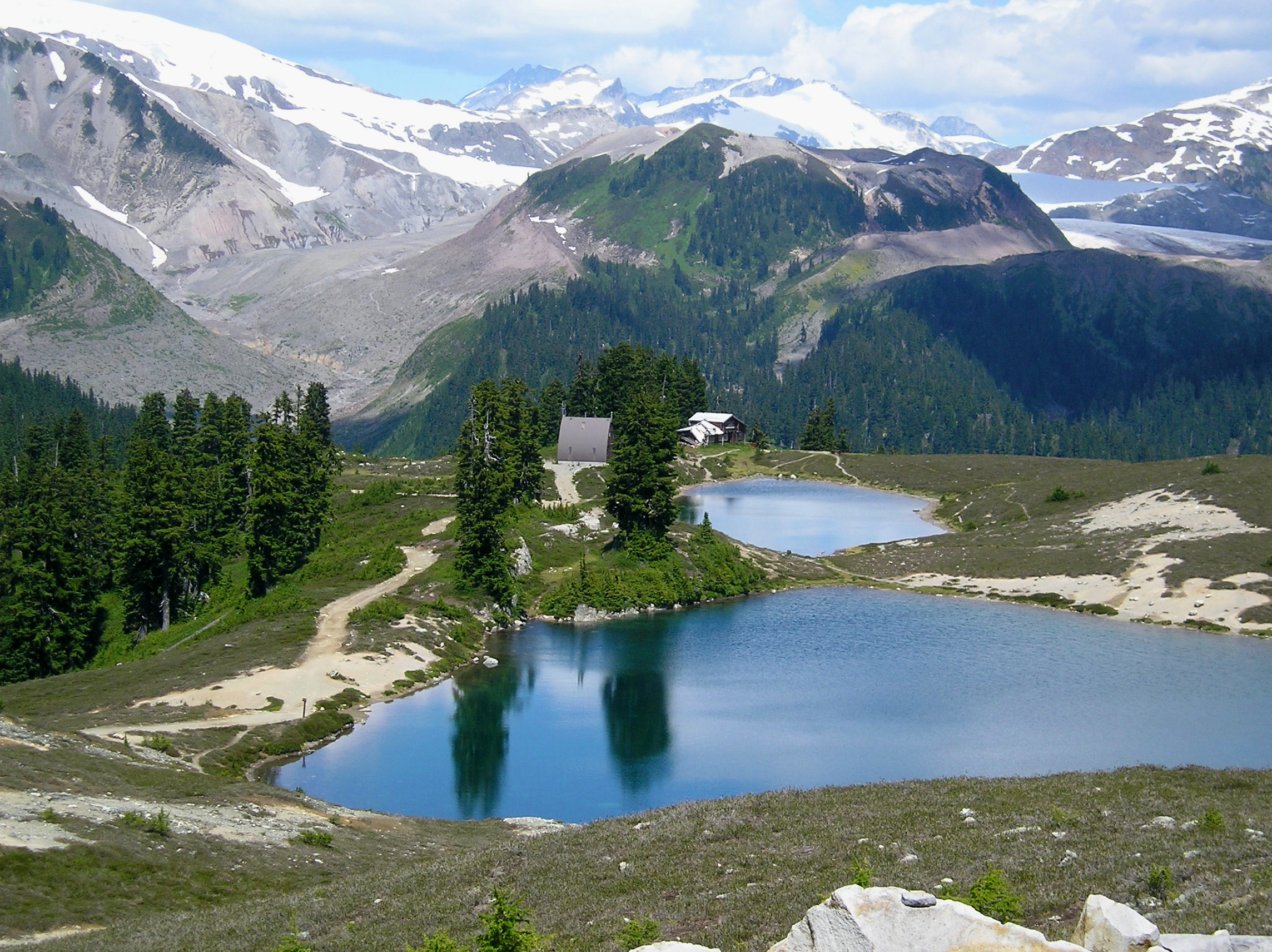

Highest point
- Elevation: 1,736 m (5,696 ft)
- Prominence: 86 m (282 ft)
- Coordinates: 49°49′38.0″N 122°58′16.0″W

Geography
- Location within British Columbia
- Interactive map of Opal Cone
- Location: Garibaldi Park, British Columbia, Canada
- District: New Westminster Land District
- Parent range: Garibaldi Ranges
- Topo map: NTS 92G15 Mamquam Mountain

Geology
- Rock age: Holocene
- Mountain type: Cinder cone
- Volcanic arc: Canadian Cascade Arc
- Volcanic belt: Garibaldi Volcanic Belt
- Last eruption: 9300 BP

Opal Cone is a cinder cone located on the southeast flank of Mount Garibaldi in the Coast Mountains of British Columbia, Canada. It is the source of a 15 km (9 mi) long broad dacite lava flow with prominent wrinkled ridges. The lava flow is unusually long for a silicic lava flow.

Opal Cone is a member of the Cascade Volcanoes, but it is located in the Garibaldi Ranges in the Coast Mountains and not in the Cascade Range proper.

== Gallery ==
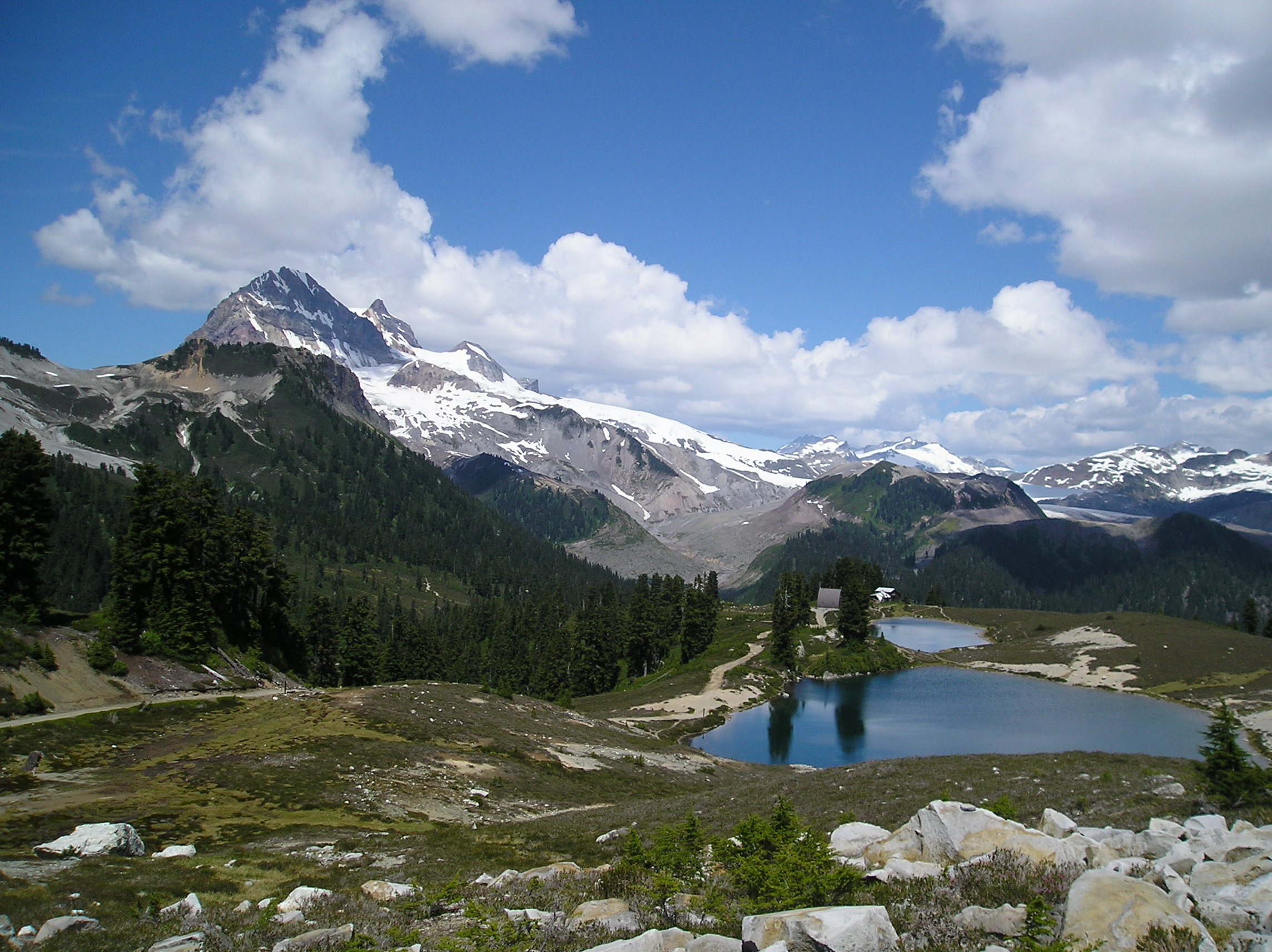

== See also ==
- List of volcanoes in Canada
- Volcanism of Canada
- Volcanism of Western Canada
- Cascade Volcanoes
- Garibaldi Volcanic Belt
- Garibaldi Lake volcanic field
