= Diamond Glacier (British Columbia) =

Glacier in British Columbia, Canada

Coordinates: 49°50′06″N 123°00′00″W

Diamond Glacier is a glacier in the Garibaldi Ranges of the Pacific Ranges in southwestern British Columbia, Canada. It lies on the Mount Garibaldi massif between Atwell Peak and Diamond Head.
