= Cheakamus Lake =

Lake in British Columbia, Canada

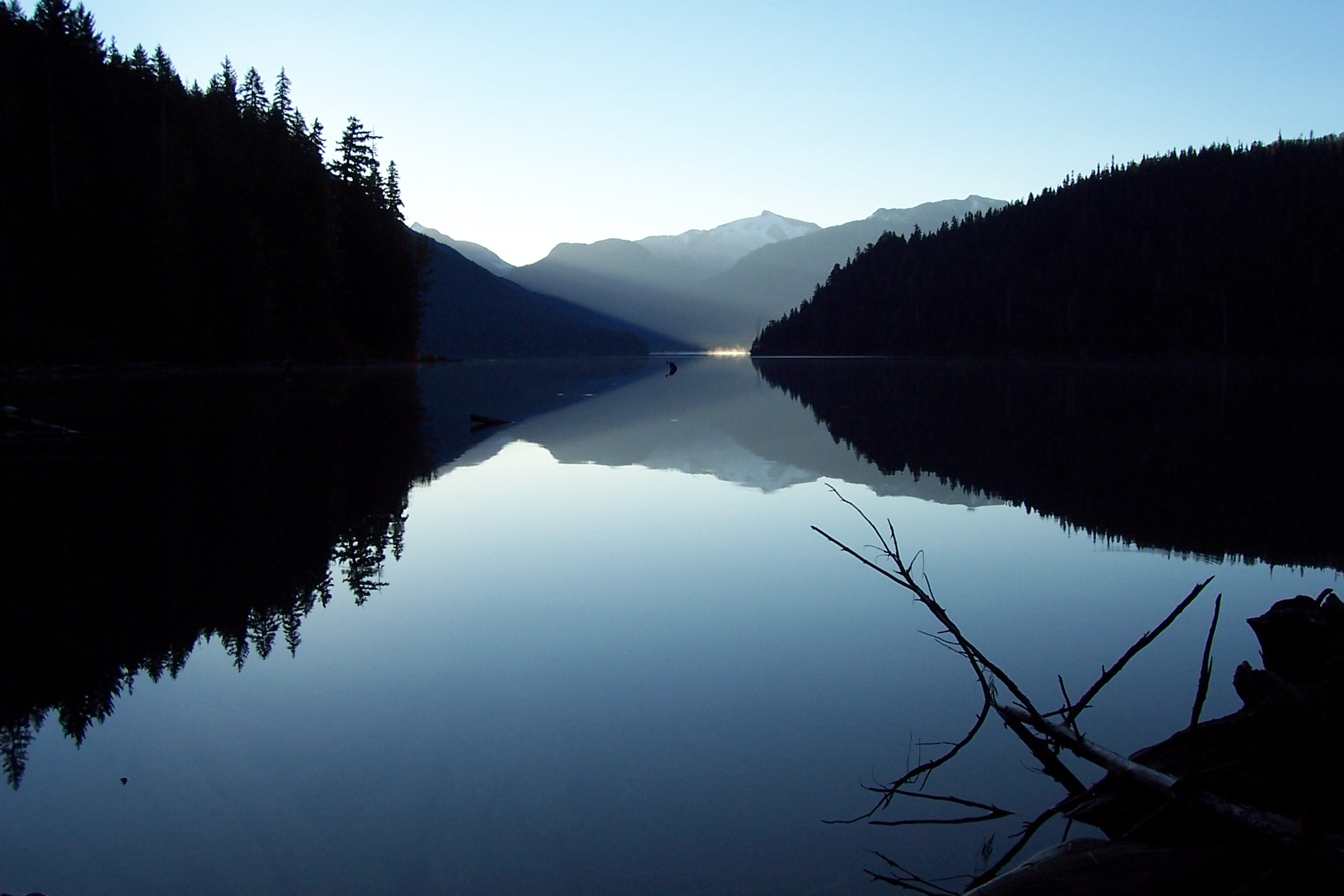

- Location within British Columbia
- Location: British Columbia
- Coordinates: 50°0′29.1″N 122°55′10.2″W
- Primary inflows: Castle Towers Creek, Cheakamus River, Singing Creek,
- Primary outflows: Cheakamus River
- Basin countries: Canada
- Surface area: 5.7 km^{2} (2.2 sq mi)
- Surface elevation: 2,730 ft (830 m)
- Islands: None
- Settlements: None

Cheakamus Lake is a lake in Garibaldi Provincial Park, on the southeastern outskirts of the resort municipality of Whistler, British Columbia. It has an area of 5.7 km^{2} (2.2 mi^{2}). It is an expansion of the upper Cheakamus River, with the river entering the lake it at its eastern end and exiting at the western end.

In 2005, 40,000 litres of sodium hydroxide were spilled into the Cheakamus River, well downstream of the lake, as a result of a CN train derailment.

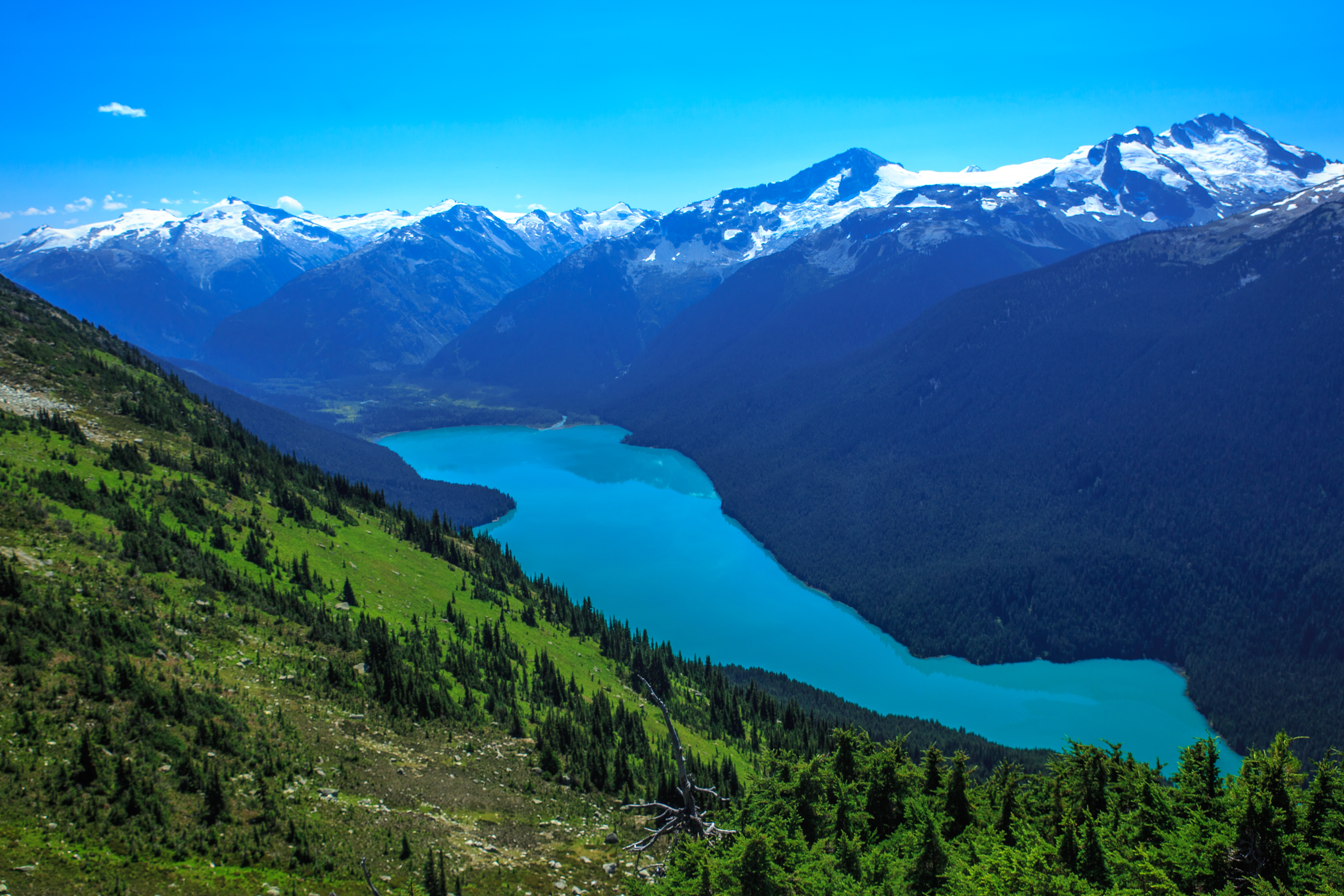
Cheakamus Lake

== See also ==
- List of lakes of British Columbia
