= Mamquam Mountain =

Mountain in British Columbia, Canada

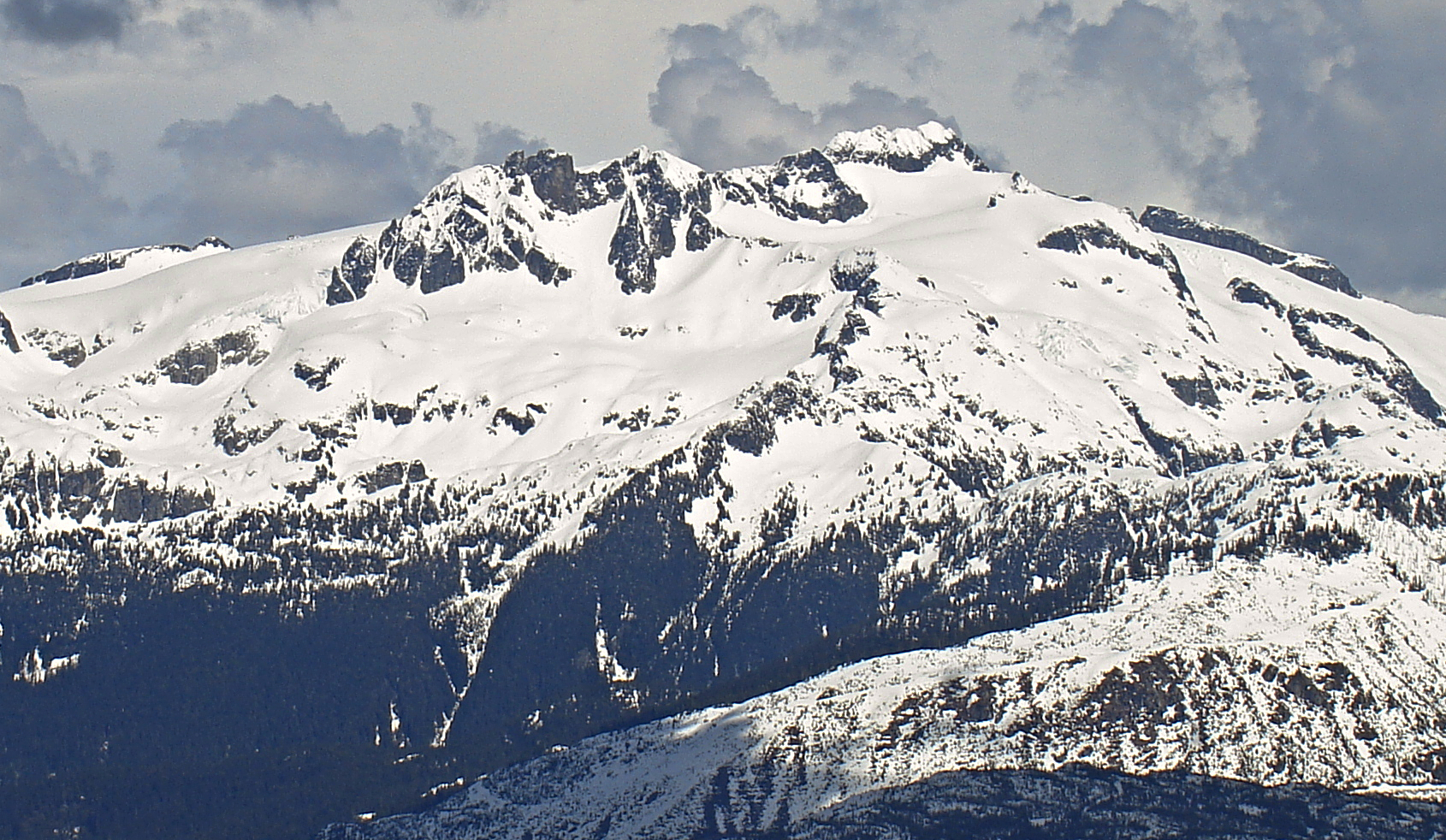
- Mamquam Mountain

Highest point
- Elevation: 2,588 m (8,491 ft)
- Prominence: 1,138 m (3,734 ft)
- Coordinates: 49°46′31″N 122°51′04″W

Geography
- Location within Squamish-Lillooet Regional District Location within British Columbia
- Interactive map of Mamquam Mountain
- Location: British Columbia, Canada
- Region: Squamish-Lillooet Regional District
- District: New Westminster Land District
- Parent range: Pacific Ranges
- Topo map: NTS 92G15 Mamquam Mountain

Climbing
- First ascent: 1911 B. Gray, C. Chapman, H. Korten, F. Perry, F. Smith

Mamquam Mountain is a mountain in the Pacific Ranges of the Coast Mountains in southwestern British Columbia, Canada, located 6 km (3.7 mi) southeast of Eanastick Meadows and 22 km (14 mi) east of Brackendale. It represents the highest summit of the Mamquam Icefield and lies at the southern end of Garibaldi Provincial Park. Mamquam Mountain was named on September 2, 1930, in association with the Mamquam River.

== Climate ==
Based on the Köppen climate classification, Mamquam Mountain is located in the marine west coast climate zone of western North America. Most weather fronts originate in the Pacific Ocean, and travel east toward the Coast Mountains where they are forced upward by the range (Orographic lift), causing them to drop their moisture in the form of rain or snowfall. As a result, the Coast Mountains experience high precipitation, especially during the winter months in the form of snowfall. Temperatures can drop below −20 °C with wind chill factors below −30 °C. The months July through September offer the most favorable weather for climbing Mamquam Mountain.

== Gallery ==
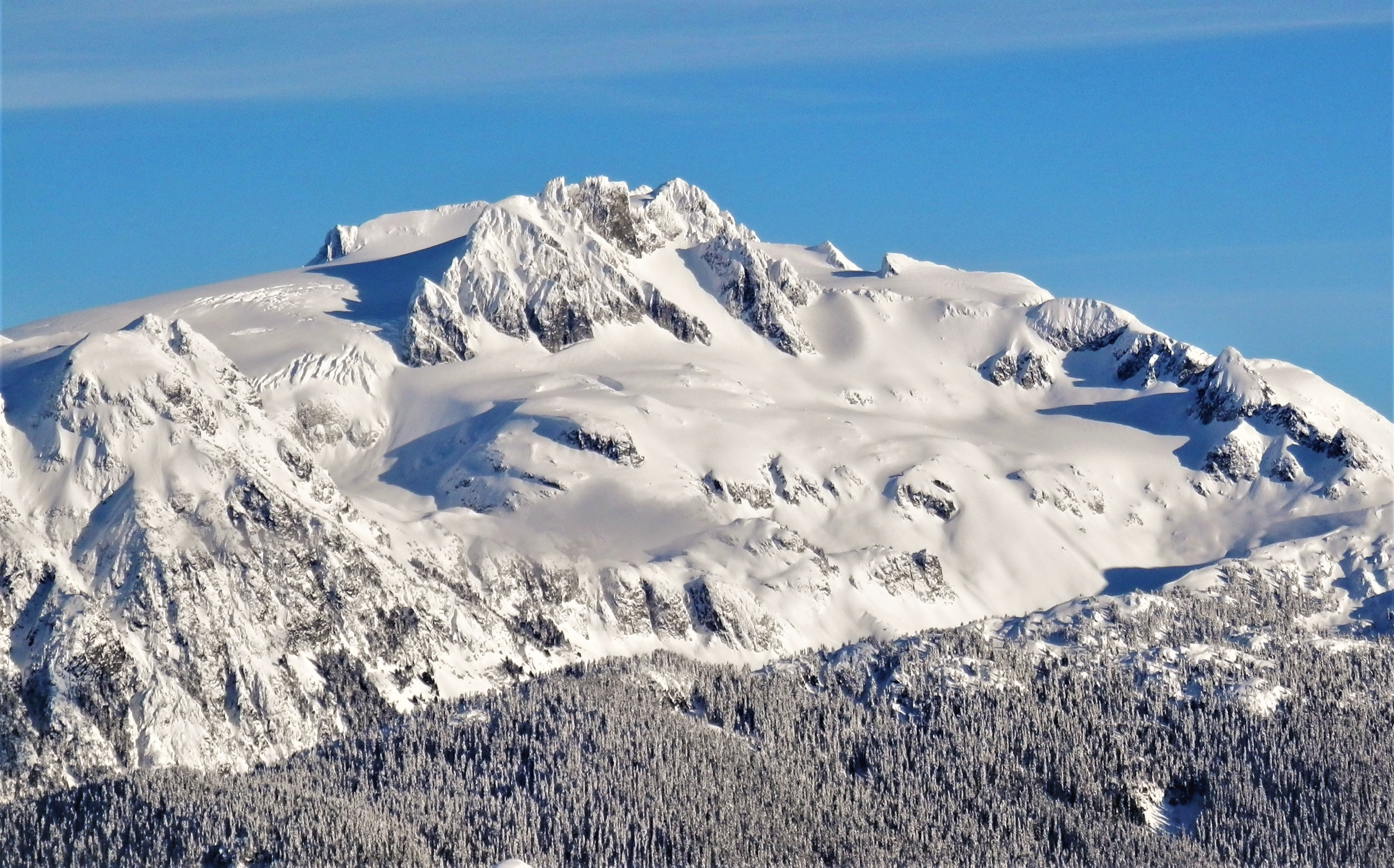
Mamquam Mountain, southwest aspect

== See also ==
- List of mountains of Canada
- Geography of British Columbia
- Geology of British Columbia
