= Garibaldi Ranges =

Mountain range in British Columbia, Canada

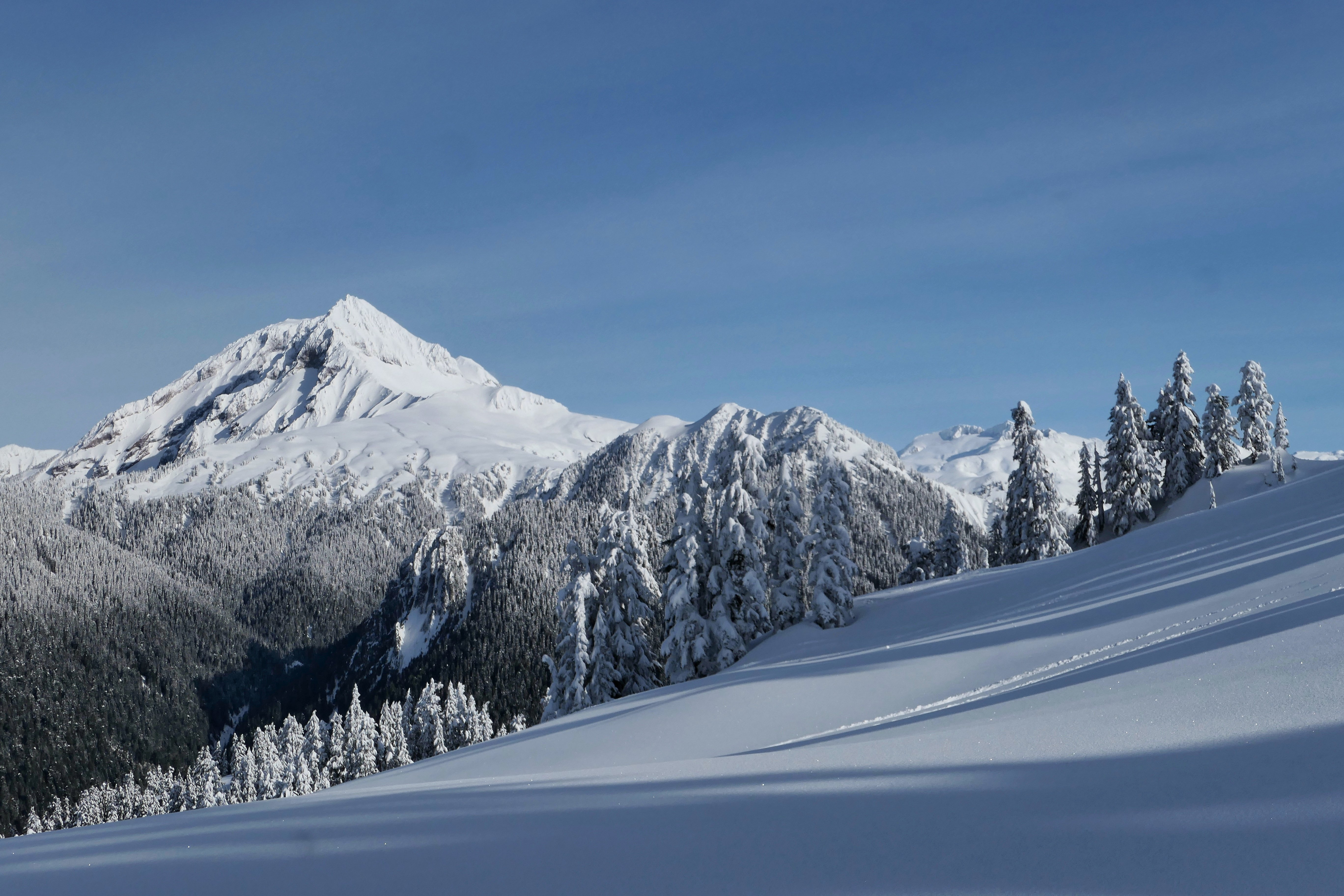
- Mount Garibaldi seen from the south

Highest point
- Peak: Wedge Mountain
- Elevation: 2,892 m (9,488 ft)
- Coordinates: 50°07′59″N 122°47′36″W

Dimensions
- Area: 4,337 km^{2} (1,675 mi^{2})

Geography
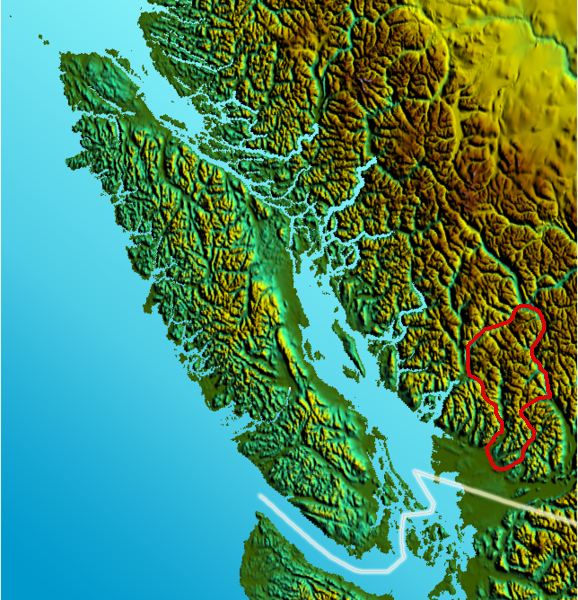
- Location map of Garibaldi Ranges
- Country: Canada
- State: British Columbia
- Settlement: Squamish
- Parent range: Pacific Ranges
- Borders on: North Shore Mountains; Lillooet Ranges; Douglas Ranges

The Garibaldi Ranges are the next-to-southwesternmost subdivision of the Pacific Ranges of the Coast Mountains; only the North Shore Mountains are farther southwest. They lie between the valley formed by the pass between the Cheakamus River and Green River on the west (the location of the Resort Municipality of Whistler) and the valley of the Lillooet River on the east, and extend south into Maple Ridge, an eastern suburb of Vancouver, and the northern District of Mission. To their south are the North Shore Mountains overlooking Vancouver while to their southeast are the Douglas Ranges.

They take their name indirectly from Mount Garibaldi on the western side of the range, which is the namesake of Garibaldi Provincial Park. Their southern end between the upper Stave River and Pitt Lake is north of the municipality of Maple Ridge, and forms Golden Ears Provincial Park (which was originally part of Garibaldi Park).

Their most famous mountain, The Black Tusk, is not among the highest in the range; it is a volcanic plug on the meadow-ridge between Garibaldi and Cheakamus Lakes, just south of the resort of Whistler, British Columbia. The highest peak in the range is just north of the resort, Wedge Mountain 2892 m (9498 ft) a.k.a. Wedgemont and "The Wedge".

The northern part of the range, consisting mostly of Garibaldi Provincial Park, is extremely alpine in character, with large icefields and a sea of high peaks. The southern part of the range, north of Stave Lake and between the upper Pitt River and the lower Lillooet River, has no major icefields because of the precipitous character of the network of plunging U-shaped valleys - many well over 5000' deep, with individual peaks with near-vertical flanks up to 7000'. At the core of this set of ridges decorated with sharp, spiny peaks, is the highest - Mount Judge Howay 2262 m (7421 ft). The southernmost major peaks of the Garibaldi Ranges are in Golden Ears Provincial Park just north of Haney (downtown Maple Ridge), whose cluster of sugarloafs resemble a donkey's ears and, on the day of naming, were gleaming in the sunset; the highest of these is Golden Ears at 1716 m (5630 ft).

== Sub-ranges ==
- Garibaldi Névé
- Fitzsimmons Range
  - Musical Bumps
- McBride Range
- Spearhead Range
- Golden Ears
- Misty Icefield
- Bastion Range
