= Garibaldi Provincial Park =

Wilderness park in British Columbia, Canada

- IUCN category II (national park)
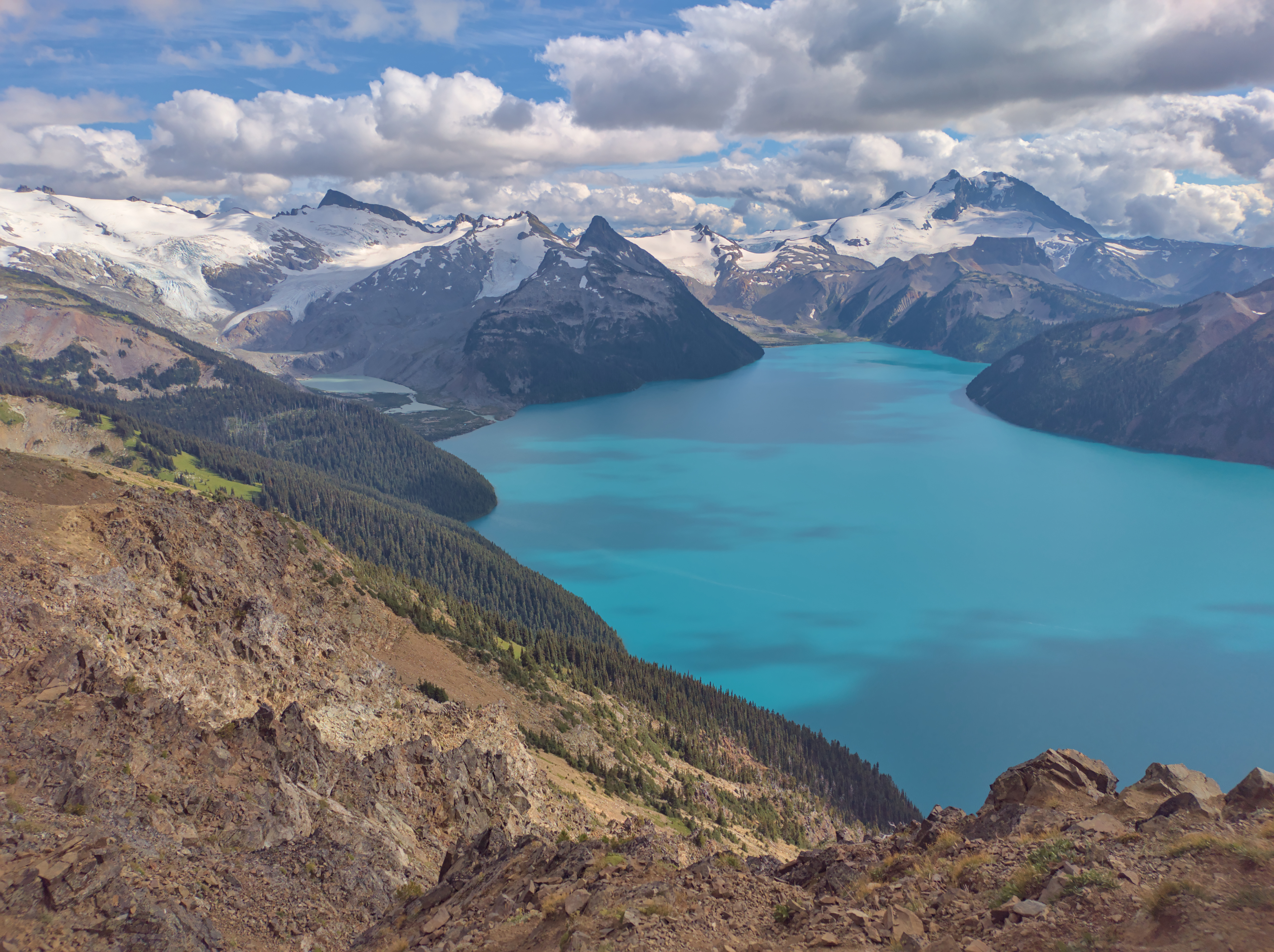
- Sphinx Glacier, Garibaldi Lake and the north face of Mount Garibaldi, looking south from Panorama Ridge at 6,900 ft (2,100 m).

- Location within British Columbia
- Interactive map of Garibaldi Provincial Park
- Location: British Columbia, Canada
- Nearest city: Squamish & Whistler, British Columbia
- Coordinates: 49°55′N 122°45′W
- Area: 1,950 km^{2} (750 sq mi)
- Established: April 29, 1920
- Governing body: BC Parks
- Website: bcparks.ca/explore/parkpgs/garibaldi/

Garibaldi Provincial Park, also called Garibaldi Park, is a wilderness park located on the coastal mainland of British Columbia, Canada, 70 kilometres (43.5 mi) north of Vancouver. It was established in 1920 and named a Class A Provincial Park of British Columbia in 1927. The park is a popular destination for outdoor recreation, with over 30,000 overnight campers and over 106,000 day users in the 2017/2018 season.

Garibaldi Park spans an area of over 1,950 square kilometres (753 sq mi), encompassing a majority of the Garibaldi Range mountains. The western side of the park is highly trafficked by the public due to access provided by the nearby Sea to Sky Highway to destinations in the park such as Elfin Lakes, Garibaldi Lake, The Black Tusk, Cheakamus Lake, and Wedgemount Lake. The eastern wilderness of the park is harder to access and therefore more remote than its western counterpart. To the south, Garibaldi Park connects with Golden Ears Provincial Park and Pinecone Burke Provincial Park, while its northern sections stretch past the Whistler ski resort, reaching nearly to the village of Pemberton.

== History ==
=== Indigenous people ===
Mount Garibaldi is referred to by the Squamish people as Nch'ḵay̓, meaning "Dirty Place" or "Grimy One" in reference to the muddy water of the Cheekye River. The mountain is an important cultural landmark for the Squamish, with its surrounding area being used for hunting, foraging, and the collection of obsidian. In Squamish mythology, Nch'ḵay̓ was the peak to which the people tied their canoes to avoid being swept away by the Great Flood.

Another culturally significant peak within the park is The Black Tusk, which is known to the Squamish people as t'aḵ't'aḵ mu'yin tl'a in7in'a'xe7en. The name translates to "Landing Place of the Thunderbird", as the peak is said to have been crushed into its present shape by the talons of the in7in'a'xe7en, or Thunderbird. To the Lil'wat people, the same peak is known as Q̓elqámtensa ti Skenknápa, or "Place Where the Thunder Rests".

=== Later history ===
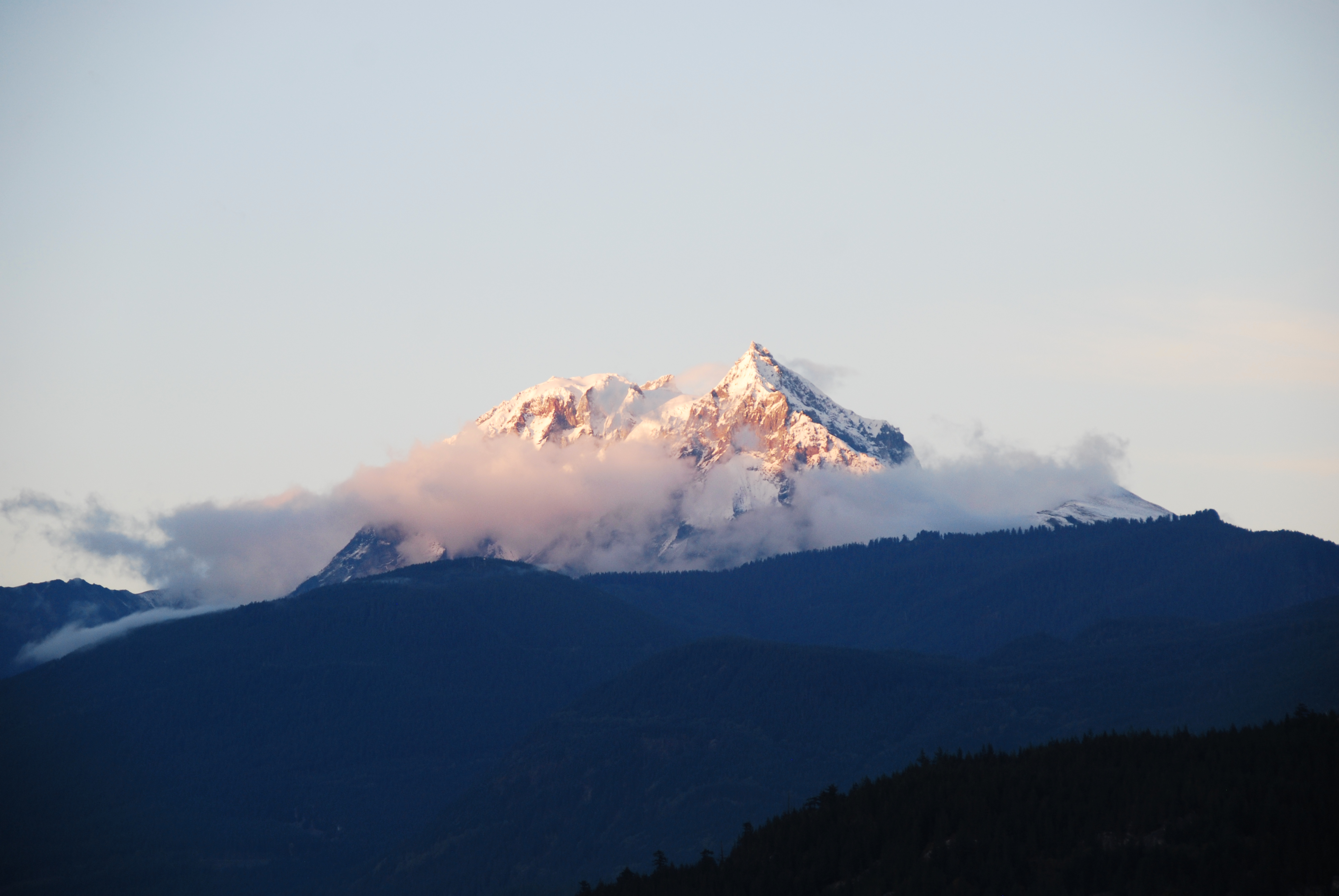
Mount Garibaldi's south face, as seen from Squamish. This is the view George Henry Richards had when he named the peak during the survey in Howe Sound. Garibaldi Park takes its name from this peak.

Garibaldi Provincial Park received its modern name from Mount Garibaldi, which was itself named after Giuseppe Garibaldi by Captain George Henry Richards during a survey of Howe Sound in 1860.

Topographical map of Garibaldi Provincial Park, drafted in 1928.

In 1907, the first ascent of Mount Garibaldi was completed by Vancouver mountaineers A. Dalton, W. Dalton, A. King, T. Pattison, J. J. Trorey, and G. Warren. The views from the peaks inspired the establishment of summer climbing camps at Garibaldi Lake, which included among their ranks many members of the newly formed British Columbia Mountaineering Club. The first of these camps resulted in the naming and first ascent of The Black Tusk, by a party led by William J. Gray in 1912. The interest sparked by the camps eventually led to the park being legislated as a park reserve in 1920, and designated as a Class A Provincial park in 1927.

In 1967, the southern section of Garibaldi Provincial park was split off as Golden Ears Provincial Park, which juts southward between the basins of Pitt Lake and the Stave River into the Municipality of Maple Ridge.

Today, Garibaldi park is a popular location for outdoor recreation, and has experienced greatly increased usage within the past decade. In the five-year period between the 2012/13 season and the 2017/18 season, the park's attendance increased three-fold in number of overnight campers, while the number of day users increased ten-fold.

== Geology ==
=== Geological features ===
The park's landscape consists of many steep rugged mountains, coastal forests, and alpine lakes. Much of this landscape was shaped by Quaternary continental and alpine glaciation, as well as volcanic activity such as the eruption of Mount Garibaldi some 13,000 years ago.

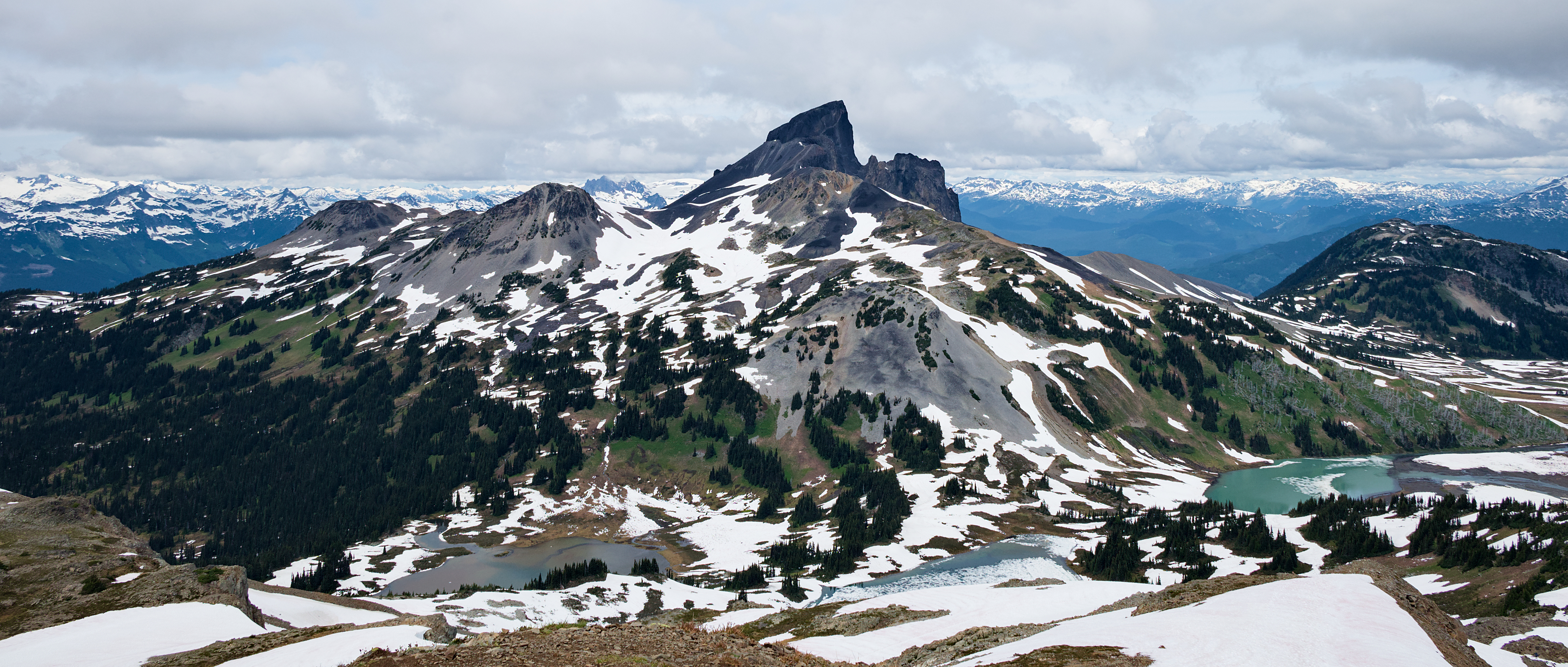
The Black Tusk, as seen from the trail to Panorama Ridge.

There are over 150 glaciers in the park, including the Garibaldi Névé and Mamquam icefields. The highest peak in Garibaldi Park is Wedge Mountain, at an elevation of 2,891 metres (9,485 ft). It also includes volcanic features such as an andesite tuya known as The Table, a cinder cone known as the Opal Cone, and the stratovolcanoes Mount Garibaldi, Mount Price and The Black Tusk, which are part of the Garibaldi Volcanic Belt.

There are a number of alpine lakes in the park, including Garibaldi Lake, Cheakamus Lake, Mamquam Lake, Elfin Lakes, and a number of smaller lakes. The park is also the origin of the Pitt River, a tributary of the Fraser River.

=== The Barrier ===
Garibaldi Lake is retained by a lava dam known as The Barrier. Sometime in the fall or winter of 1855–56, part of this dam gave away, which resulted in a 25,000,000 m^{3} (880,000,000 ft^{3}) landslide that devastated the area below. The instability of The Barrier was brought to public attention in the 1970s, eventually leading to the area below it being declared unsafe for habitation in 1981. The village of Garibaldi was evacuated as a result of this.

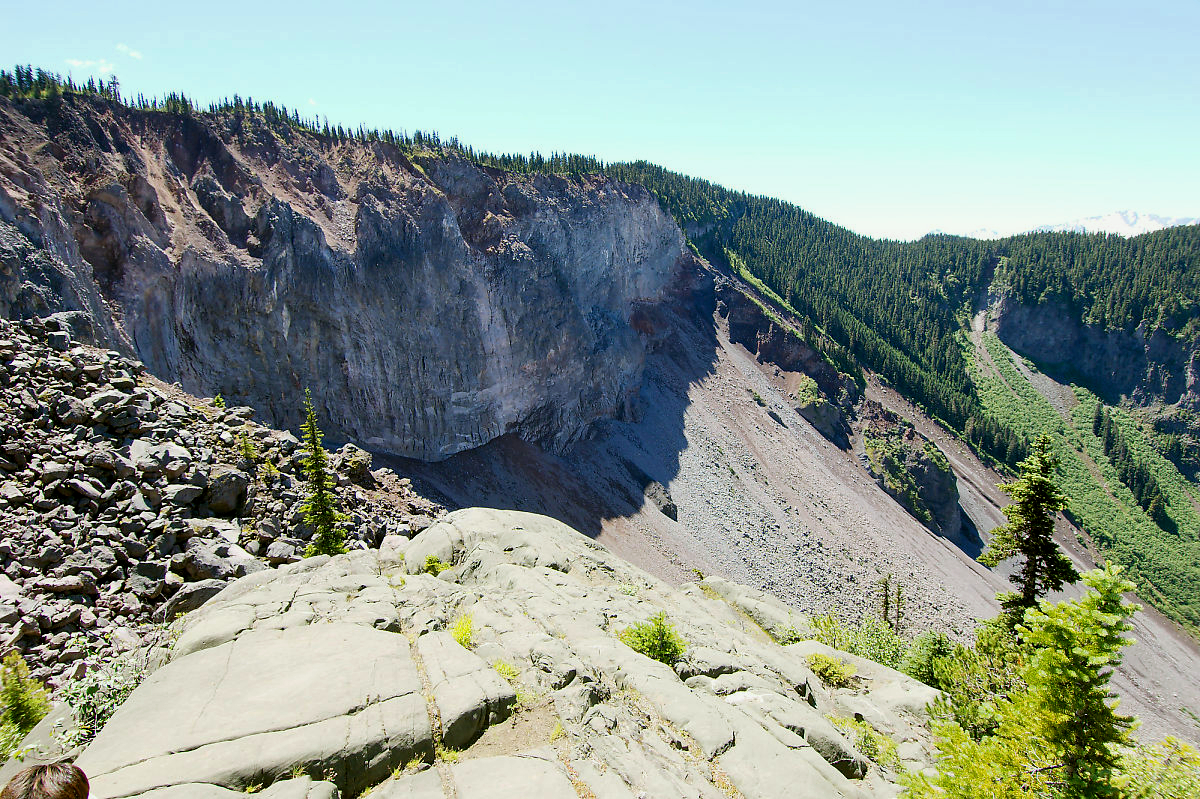
View of The Barrier, which was declared unstable in 1981 and resulted in the evacuation of the village of Garibaldi.

Today, the land immediately below The Barrier is referred to as the Barrier Civil Defence Zone by BC Parks. The area around it is denoted by signage warning hikers not to camp, stop, or otherwise linger within the hazard zone.

=== Glacial recession ===
In 2007, a study on glacial recession in Garibaldi Park was conducted by the Department of Earth Sciences at Simon Fraser University. This study determined that, by 2005, glacier coverage in the park had decreased to 49% of what it was in the early 18th century. The study attributed this decrease to the trend of global temperature change in the 20th century.

A similar study in 2013 by the same authors reinforced that the park's glaciers, along with others in western Canada, are at the smallest they have been in several thousand years.

== Ecology ==
=== Flora ===
Garibaldi's vegetation varies with elevation. The lower slopes of the park, between 1,000 and 1,700 metres (3,300 and 5,600 ft) above sea level, are dominated by dense forests of douglas fir, western red cedar and western hemlock. Forests of mountain hemlock, yellow cedar, alpine fir, and white bark pine are present in the higher elevations, and these eventually give way to parkland featuring the characteristically stunted trees of subalpine climates.

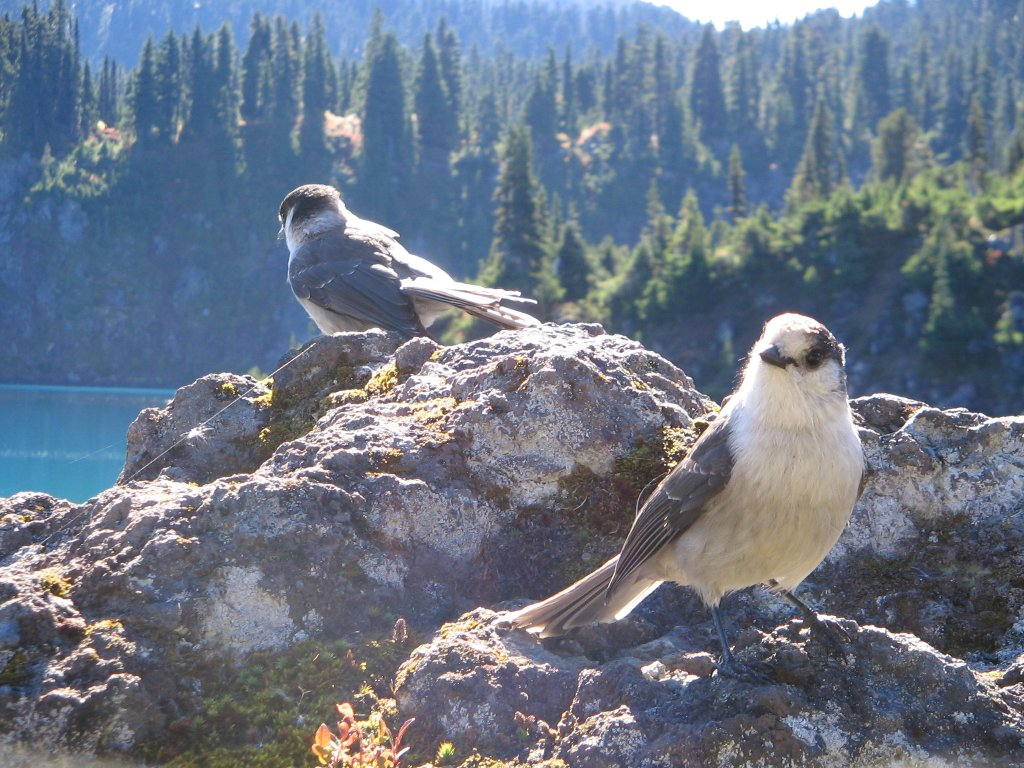
Canada jays, known colloquially as Whisky Jacks, are a common sight in many of the higher slopes in the region.

Much of the park resides in the alpine and subalpine zones, and the park's alpine meadows are carpeted by many species of alpine plants, including heather, western anemone, lupine, arnica, Indian paintbrush, and avalanche lily. The park's flowers are typically most prominent in August.

=== Fauna ===
Wildlife thrives in Garibaldi Park, including mammals such as grizzly and black bears, mountain goat, deer, marmot, and pika. A number of birds are present in the park, including the American three-toed woodpecker, common raven, Canada jay, and ptarmigans.

As part of the park's 1990 management plan, an assessment was done on the park's mountain goat population in the Spearhead area, which at the time numbered from 50 to 70 individuals. The goal, supported by the provincial conservation framework of BC, was to maintain healthy, viable populations of the animal, thus preventing it from entering "at risk" status. Monitoring flights in March 2012 and March 2013 determined this population was "relatively stable and healthy", but as this was limited to the Spearhead area, no determination of the status of mountain goats throughout the park was made.

== Recreational use ==
Garibaldi Provincial Park is a prominent outdoor recreation destination, featuring many kilometres of hiking trails, campgrounds, and winter camping facilities. In 2016, the park's popularity prompted the province to implement an online system for advance bookings for all overnight stays. Prior to this change, campers wishing to stay overnight could register on the day of their arrival in the park. Garibaldi Park was the third BC provincial park to implement this requirement for backcountry use, the others being Bowron Lake Provincial Park and Berg Lake in Mount Robson Provincial Park.

While the most popular activities in the park are hiking and backcountry camping, other activities include fishing, swimming, canoeing/kayaking, rock climbing, mountaineering, mountain biking, and backcountry skiing. All of the access points, and most of the man-made facilities, are located on the west side of the park, while the eastern wilderness of the park is more remote and less frequented by humans.

=== Access points ===
The park's five main points of entry are accessed from the Sea to Sky Highway. Each point connects to a specific region of the park, although it is possible to access multiple regions from some access points by following the park's interconnected trails.

- Diamond Head in Squamish is the southernmost entrance. It provides hiking and skiing access to the area south of Mount Garibaldi, including Mamquam Lake, Red Heather Meadows, and Elfin Lakes.
- The Black Tusk/Garibaldi Lake entrance is located roughly halfway between Squamish and Whistler at Rubble Creek, and can be used to reach Garibaldi Lake via a steep trail with many switchbacks. The Garibaldi Lake and Taylor Meadows campgrounds can be reached using this trail. This entrance also provides access to The Black Tusk and Panorama Ridge, and connects to Cheakamus Lake through the Helm Creek trail to the north.

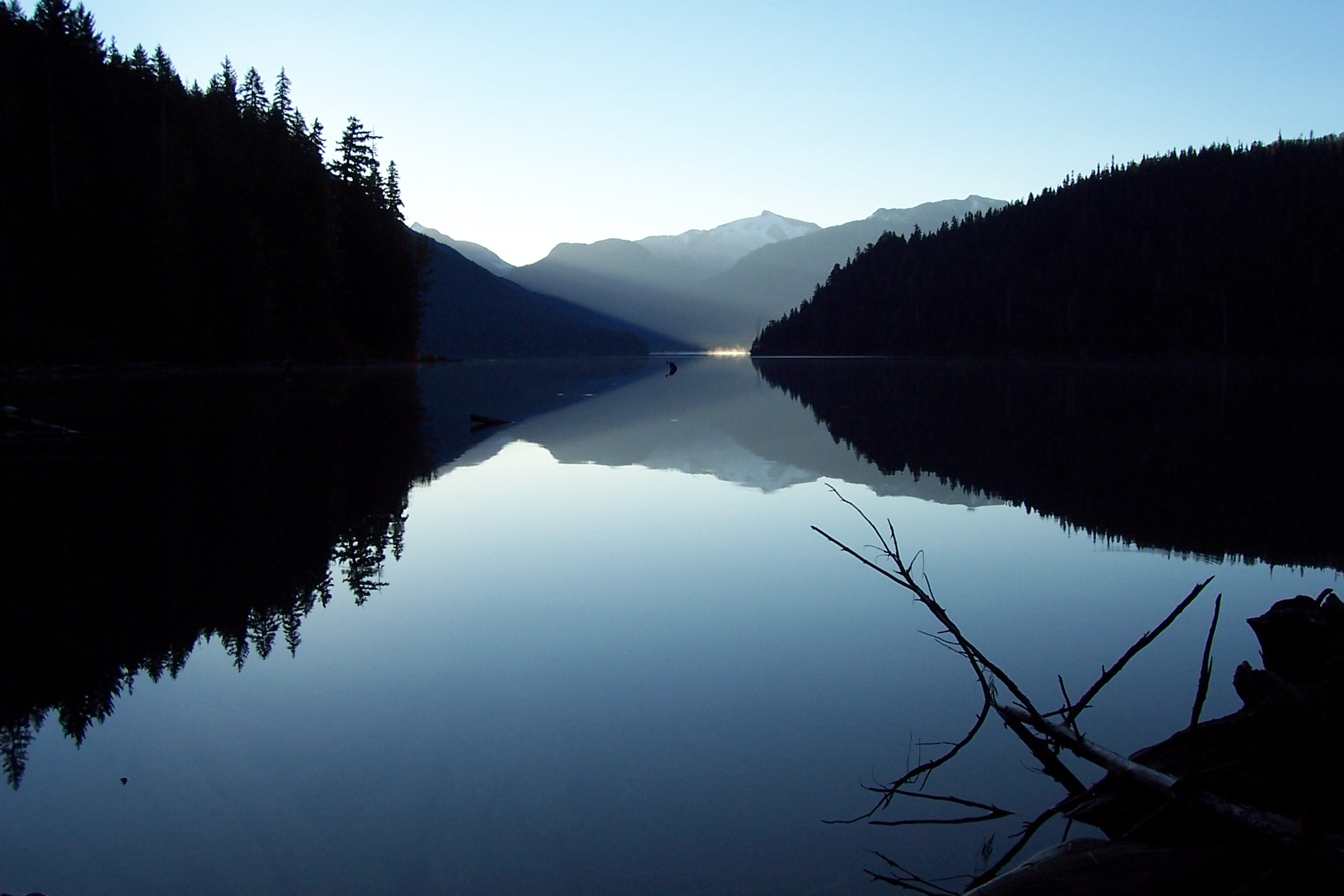
Cheakamus Lake at dawn.

- Cheakamus Lake is an entrance located just south of Whistler, providing access to Cheakamus Lake, and connecting to other trails further south in the park via the Helm Creek trail.
- Singing Pass is accessed from the community of Whistler. This entrance follows Fitzsimmons Creek, between the Whistler and Blackcomb mountains, to the Singing Pass area. An alpine route also connects to Singing Pass from the top of Whistler Mountain.

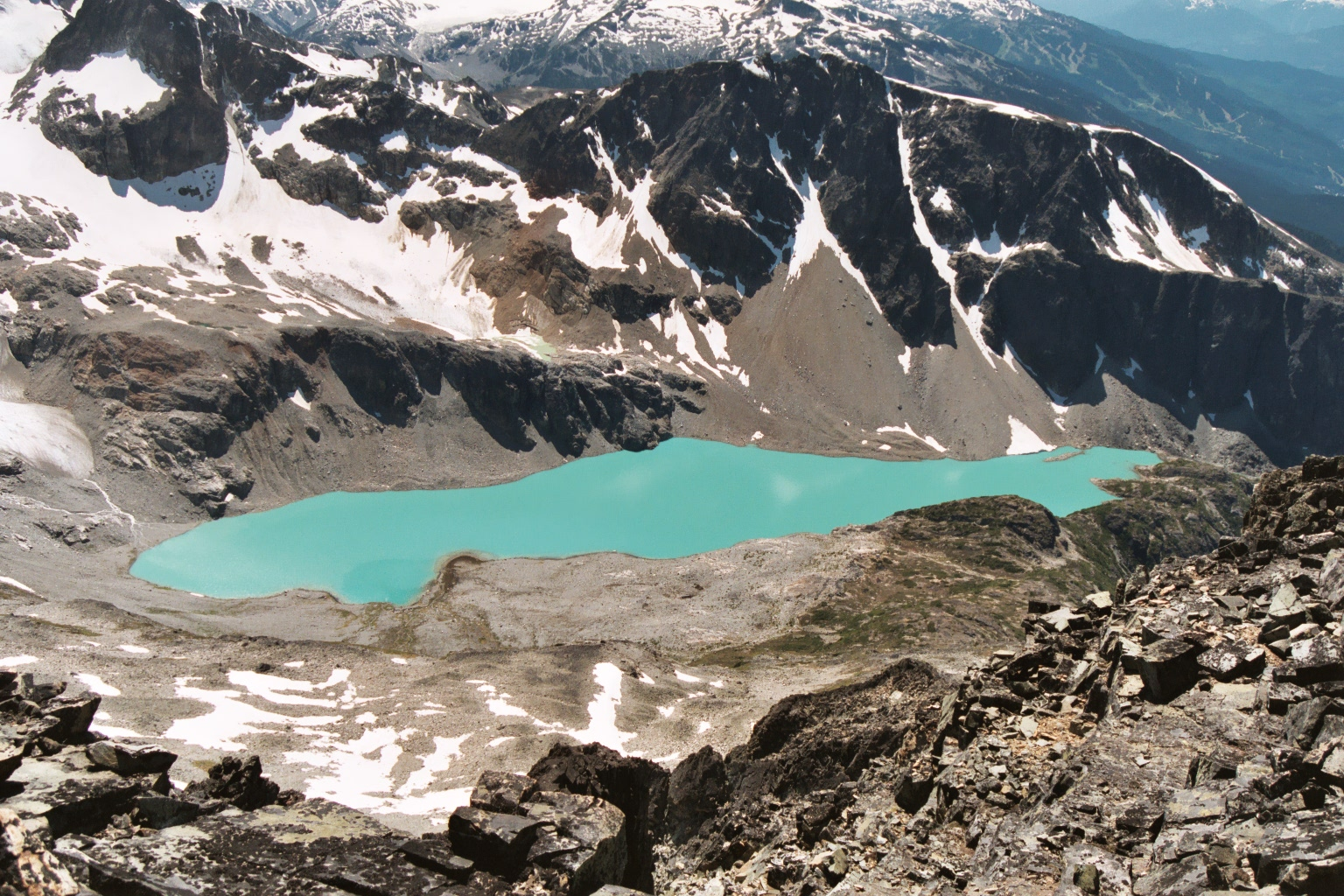
Wedgemount Lake with Whistler Mountain visible in the top right corner.

- Wedgemount Lake is the northernmost entrance to the park. It is reached via a deactivated forest service road, providing access to Wedgemount Lake.

=== Camping ===
Garibaldi Park has both walk-in and wilderness camping, as well as some shelters. All walk-in campgrounds must be reserved before use, while wilderness camping (i.e. camping in areas other than designated tent pads) is only allowed in the Garibaldi Wilderness Camping Area, which is away from the more trafficked areas of the park and carries some wilderness-specific rules and guidelines. A total of 11 walk-in campgrounds exist in the park, albeit one campground, Red Heather Meadows, is only open during the winter season. The walk-in campgrounds have anywhere from 6 sites at the Singing Creek campground, to 50 sites at the Garibaldi Lake Campground.

There are four overnight-use shelters in the park:

- Elfin Lakes Shelter is located at Elfin Lakes and can be reserved year round. This shelter can house 33 people and contains propane burners, which are supplied with propane by BC Parks.
- Russet Lake Hut was originally built in 1968, and is also known as the Himmelsbach Hut. This small cabin at Russet Lake is used as a cooking shelter and bear cache, and sleeps 6. Plans are in place to replace the Russel Lake Hut as part of the Spearhead Huts project.
- Wedgemount Lake Hut was built at Wedgemount Lake in 1970, and is a basic hut mostly intended to be used as an emergency shelter.
- Burton Hut, also known as the Sphinx Hut, is located across from the Garibaldi Lake campground at the base of Sphinx Glacier and can house 10–15 people. It was built by the University of British Columbia's Varsity Outdoor Club in 1969. Due to its affiliation with the Varsity Outdoor Club, this hut is reserved via the Club rather than the provincial park website.

=== Hiking ===
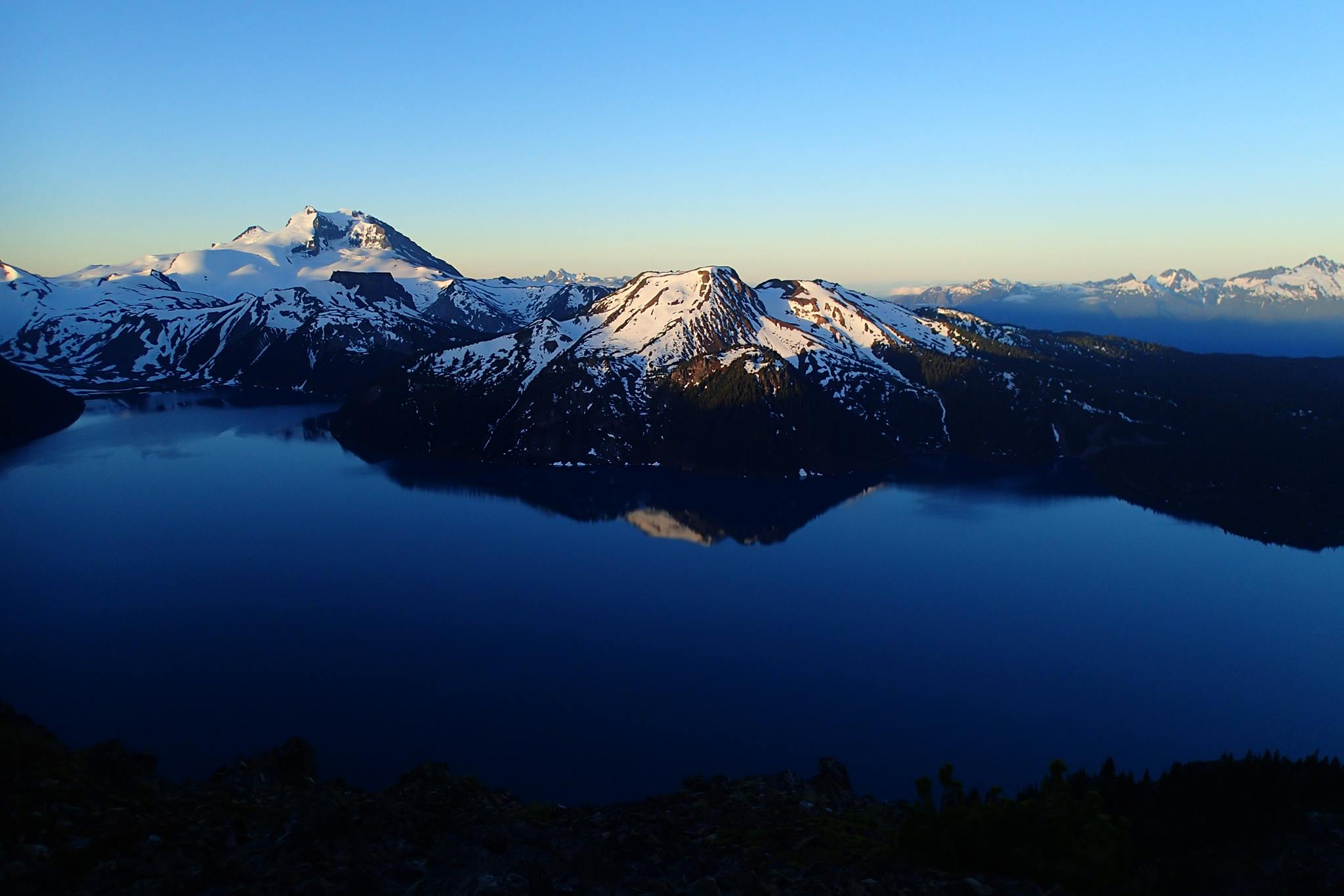
Garibaldi Lake as seen from Panorama Ridge at dawn. Mount Garibaldi's north face, as well as The Table are visible on the upper left. Mount Price is visible in the middle.

The park features over 90 kilometres (56 mi) of park-maintained trails, accessible year-round, although winter hiking typically requires use of snowshoes or skis. Some of the common routes include:

- Garibaldi Lake Trail, which takes hikers to Garibaldi Lake and the corresponding campground.
- Panorama Ridge Trail, which ends at a spectacular viewpoint overlooking Garibaldi Lake.
- The Black Tusk Trail, with trailheads at Garibaldi and Cheakamus Lake. This trail reaches the base of The Black Tusk, with an optional perilous scramble leading to the top of the peak.
- Elfin Lakes Trail, which leads to the lakes and is most commonly visited in the summer. This trail also provides access to the Opal Cone and Mamquam Lake.
- Wedgemount Lake Trail, a steep hike leading to Wedgemount Lake.
- Mount Price Trail, a rough unofficial route leading to Mount Price.

=== Other activities ===
- Winter sports are a common use of the park during the snowy months. Most of the park's facilities, campgrounds, and trails can still be accessed in the winter by ski touring.
- Fishing is allowed with a permit at Garibaldi, Cheakamus, and Mamquam lakes.
- Canoeing and kayaking is allowed at Cheakamus Lake only.
- Swimming is permitted at Elfin Lakes (in designated areas), Garibaldi, Cheakamus, Russet, and Wedgemount lakes, although there are no lifeguards on duty. Being glacier fed, the lakes are very cold year-round.
- Rock climbing is possible at various granite walls around the park, and can be found using local climbing guidebooks. Climbing The Black Tusk is generally not recommended due to loose, unstable rock.
- Cycling, although prohibited in most of the park, is allowed on parts of the Elfin Lakes trail and Cheakamus Lake trail.
- Mountaineering is one of the oldest outdoor sports practised at the park, ever since the first summit of Mount Garibaldi. Many of the park's peaks have been summited and provide ample opportunity for mountaineering and alpinism.
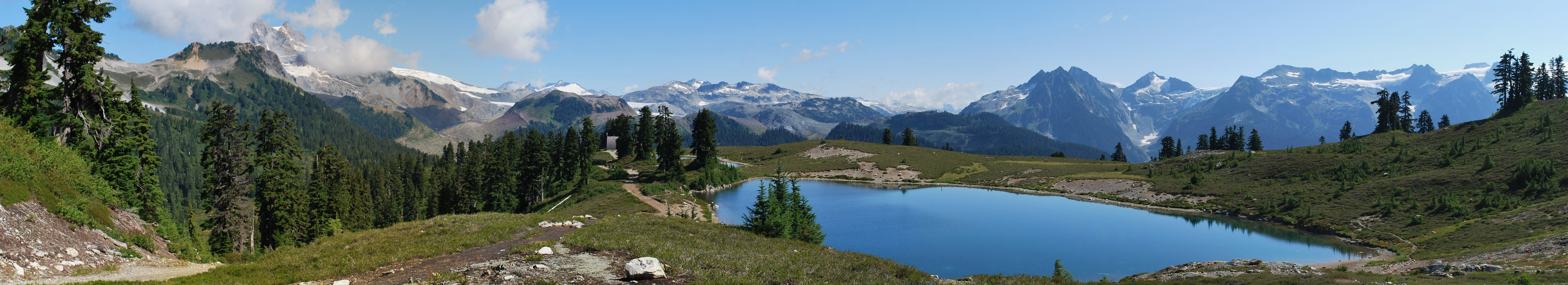
Panorama of the Elfin Lakes

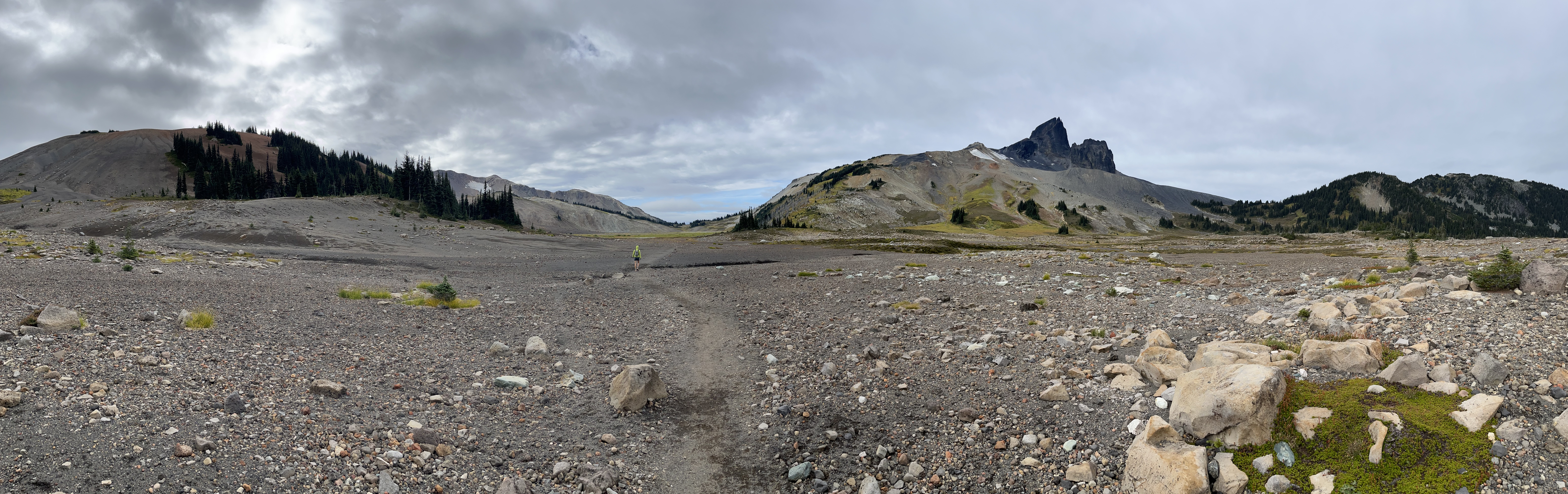
Hiker crossing Cinder Flats with The Black Tusk in the background

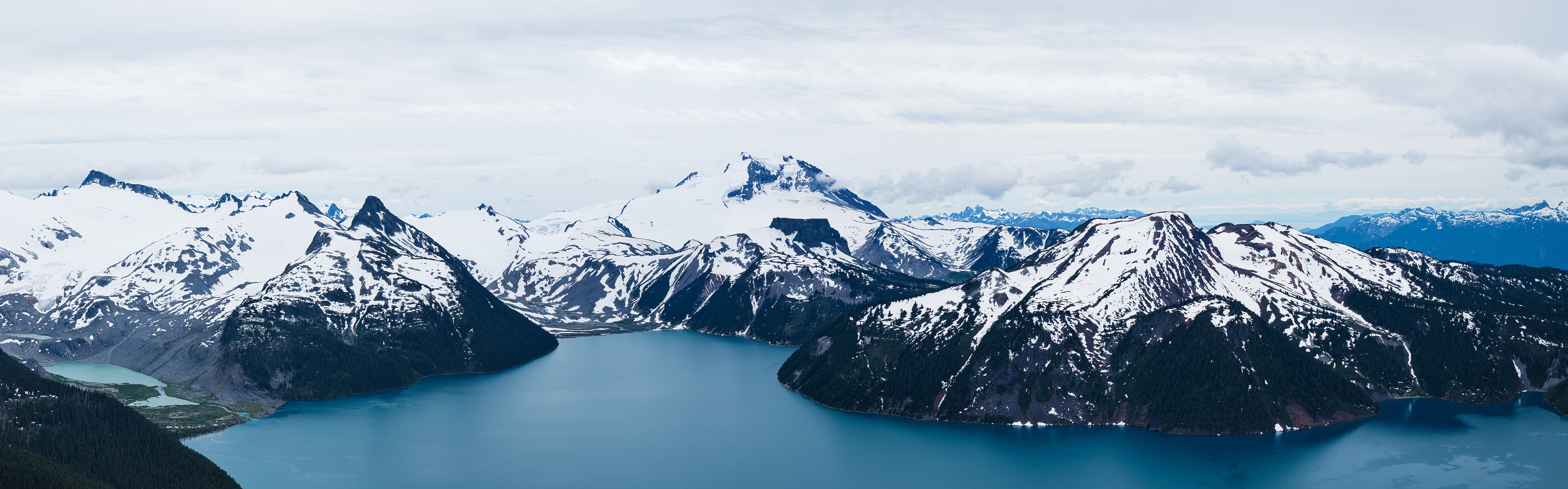
Panorama of Garibaldi Lake from Panorama Ridge

== See also ==
- List of provincial parks of Mainland British Columbia Coast
