= Rubble Creek =

Creek in southwestern British Columbia, Canada

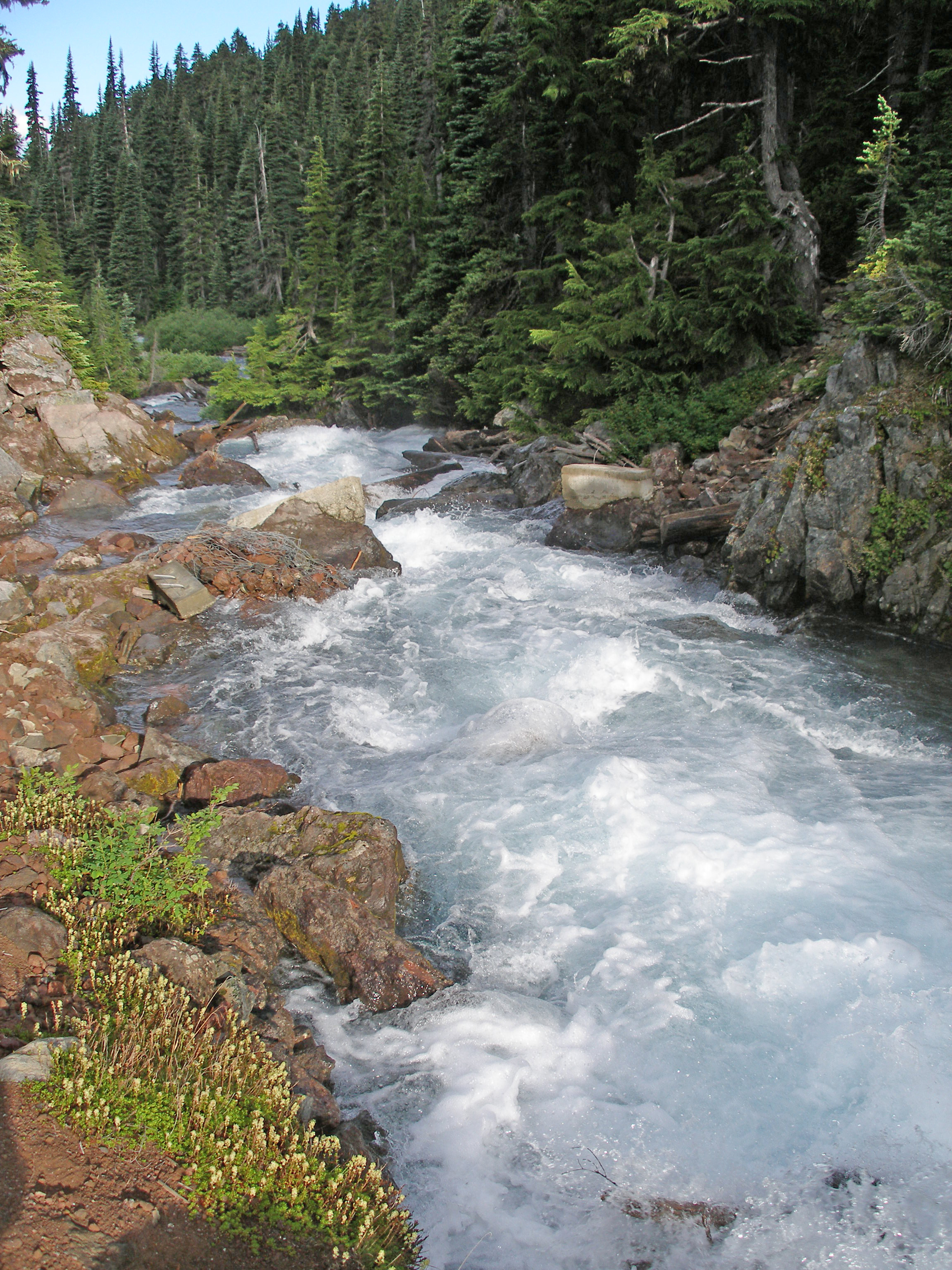
- Rubble Creek between Garibaldi Lake and Lesser Garibaldi Lake

- Mouth of Rubble Creek

Location
- Country: Canada
- Province: British Columbia
- District: New Westminster Land District

Physical characteristics
- Source: Sentinel Glacier
  - location: Garibaldi Ranges
  - coordinates: 49°53′36″N 122°58′46″W
  - elevation: 1,660 m (5,450 ft)
- Mouth: Cheakamus River
  - coordinates: 49°58′15″N 123°8′47″W
  - elevation: 344 m (1,129 ft)
- Length: 17.8 km (11.1 mi)
- Discharge
  - average: 5.57 m^{3}/s (197 cu ft/s)

Basin features
- Tributaries
  - right: Mimulus Creek, Parnasus Creek, Taylor Creek
- Topo map: NTS 92G14 Cheakamus River and 92G15 Mamquam Mountain

Rubble Creek, formerly called Stony Creek, is a tributary of the Cheakamus River in the province of British Columbia, Canada. It flows generally west and northwest for 17.8 km (11.1 mi). Most of its course is from Garibaldi Lake to the Cheakamus River. On the way it passes through a large amount of rubble from a geologically unstable lava dam called The Barrier. According to a streamflow gauge that operated from 1924 to 1955, Rubble Creek's mean annual discharge is 5.57 m^{3}/s (197 cu ft/s). Its watershed, which includes Garibaldi Lake and Barrier Lake, covers 74.1 km^{2} (28.6 sq mi). The mouth of Rubble Creek is located about 19 km (12 mi) north of Squamish, about 13 km (8.1 mi) southwest of Whistler, and about 50 km (31 mi) north of Vancouver. Almost all of Rubble Creek is within Garibaldi Provincial Park.

Rubble Creek is in the traditional territory of both the Squamish Nation (Sk̲wx̲wú7mesh Nation), the First Nations government of the Squamish people, and the Lilʼwat First Nation (Lil̓wat or L̓il̓wat7úl Nation) of the Stʼatʼimc people. The village of "Spo7ez", located at the mouth of Rubble Creek, was a trading center shared by both indigenous nations. According to oral histories, the village was destroyed by a landslide in the mid-19th century. A traditional story describes the Thunderbird causing a volcanic eruption and a massive rockslide that completely buried an earlier ancient village at Spo7ez.

== Geography ==
Rubble Creek originates from the meltwater of Sentinel Glacier and Phoenix Glacier on the northwestern slopes of Deception Peak and Glacier Pikes, high mountains of the Garibaldi Ranges. It flows into Garibaldi Lake after about 2.5 km (1.6 mi). Garibaldi Lake receives tributary creeks including Mimutus Creek, and several unnamed streams flowing from high peaks north of the lake. Significant mountains and glaciers north and east of Garibaldi Lake include The Sphinx and Sphinx Glacier, Guard Mountain, The Bookworms, Castle Towers Mountain, Helm Peak and Helm Glacier, Panorama Ridge, Cinder Cone, and The Black Tusk, among others. Mountains on the south side of Garibaldi Lake include The Table, Mount Price, and Clinker Peak.

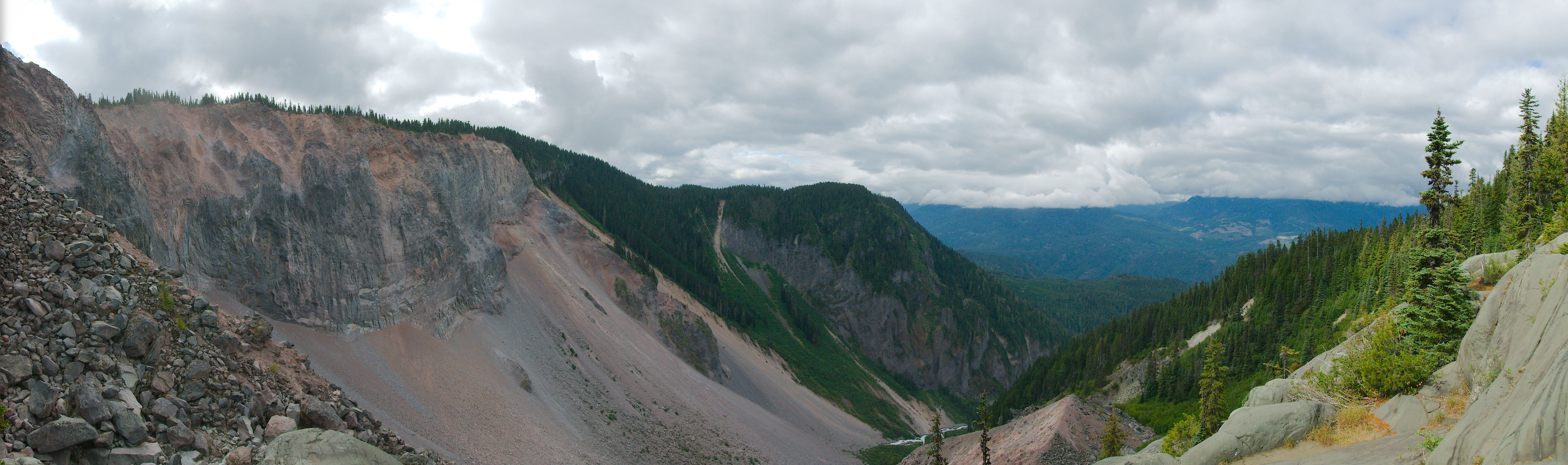
A panorama of The Barrier headwall from The Barrier viewpoint. Rubble Creek can be seen emerging from the rubble in the valley below The Barrier.

At the northwest end of Garibaldi Lake its waters flow out into Rubble Creek. The creek receives the tributary Parnasus Creek from the north, then enters Lesser Garibaldi Lake. Taylor Creek flows from the north into Lesser Garibaldi Lake. Rubble Creek continues after exiting the lake. As it approaches the headwall of The Barrier, a lava dam, it pools into a small lake called Barrier Lake. Rubble Creek usually follows a subterranean channel under The Barrier from Lesser Garibaldi Lake, but at times of high water, a part of the stream flows over the surface of the volcanic dam to Barrier Lake. It then flows through an outlet at the southern end of Barrier Lake and flows over The Barrier headwall into the lower valley. After The Barrier, Rubble Creek flows generally northwest to the Cheakamus River. Within a kilometer of Cheakamus River Rubble Creek exits Garibaldi Provincial Park. Rubble Creek passes under the "Sea to Sky Highway", part of British Columbia Highway 99, just before joining the Cheakamus River. A short road from Highway 99 goes up Rubble Creek into Garibaldi Park to the Rubble Creek Trailhead, one of the main hiking routes into the park.

Rubble Creek's confluence with the Cheakamus River is near the townsite of Garibaldi, British Columbia. In 1980 this settlement was ordered to be abandoned due to the hazard posed by the chance of The Barrier collapsing and releasing the water of Garibaldi Lake catastrophically.

== See also ==
- Garibaldi Lake volcanic field
- List of rivers of British Columbia
