= Deception Peak =

Mountain in the country of Canada

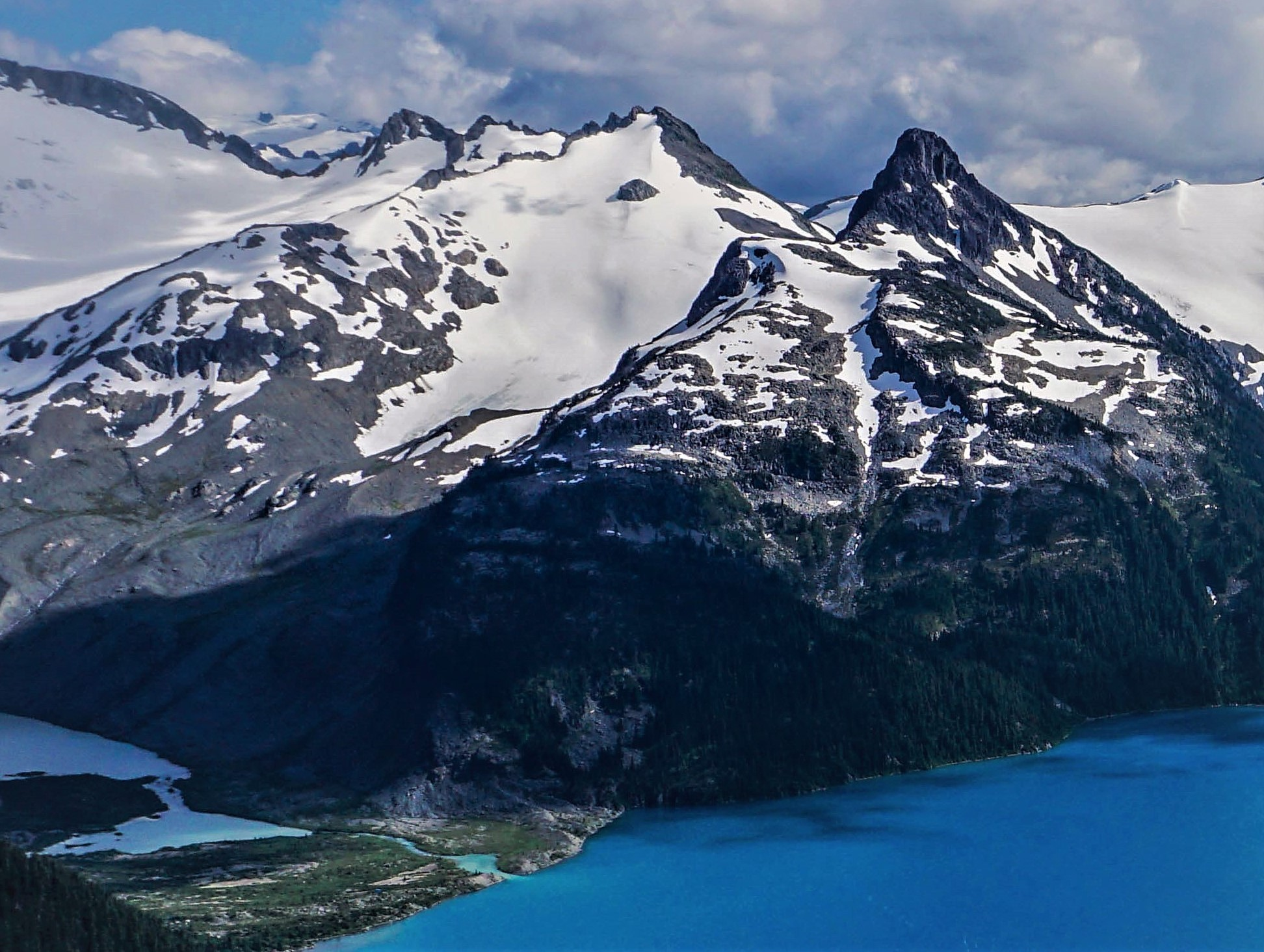
- North aspect, centre (Guard Mountain to right)

Highest point
- Elevation: 2,233 m (7,326 ft)
- Prominence: 119 m (390 ft)
- Parent peak: Castle Towers Mountain
- Isolation: 1.13 km (0.70 mi)
- Listing: Mountains of British Columbia
- Coordinates: 49°54′03″N 122°58′20″W

Geography
- Location within British Columbia Location within Canada
- Interactive map of Deception Peak
- Country: Canada
- Province: British Columbia
- District: New Westminster Land District
- Protected area: Garibaldi Provincial Park
- Parent range: Garibaldi Ranges; Coast Mountains
- Topo map: NTS 92G15 Mamquam Mountain

Climbing
- First ascent: 1922 Neal Carter, Charles Townsend

Deception Peak is a 2,233-metre (7,326-foot) summit in British Columbia, Canada.

== Description ==
Deception Peak is located within Garibaldi Provincial Park on the southeast side of Garibaldi Lake, and is part of the Garibaldi Ranges of the Coast Mountains. It is situated 72 km (45 mi) north of Vancouver, 1.51 km (1 mi) west of The Sphinx, and 1.28 km (1 mi) southeast of Guard Mountain. Precipitation runoff from the peak drains to Garibaldi Lake and topographic relief is significant as the summit rises 750 meters (2,460 feet) above the lake in two kilometers (1.2 mile). The mountain was first climbed and named by Neal Carter in 1922. The mountain's toponym was officially adopted on September 2, 1930, by the Geographical Names Board of Canada.

== Climate ==
Based on the Köppen climate classification, Deception Peak is located in the marine west coast climate zone of western North America. Most weather fronts originate in the Pacific Ocean, and travel east toward the Coast Mountains where they are forced upward by the range (orographic lift), causing them to drop their moisture in the form of rain or snowfall. As a result, the Coast Mountains experience high precipitation, especially during the winter months in the form of snowfall. Winter temperatures can drop below −20 °C with wind chill factors below −30 °C. This climate supports the Sphinx Glacier on the northeast slope of the mountain, the Sentinel Glacier to the south, and the Phoenix Glacier to the southeast.

== Gallery ==
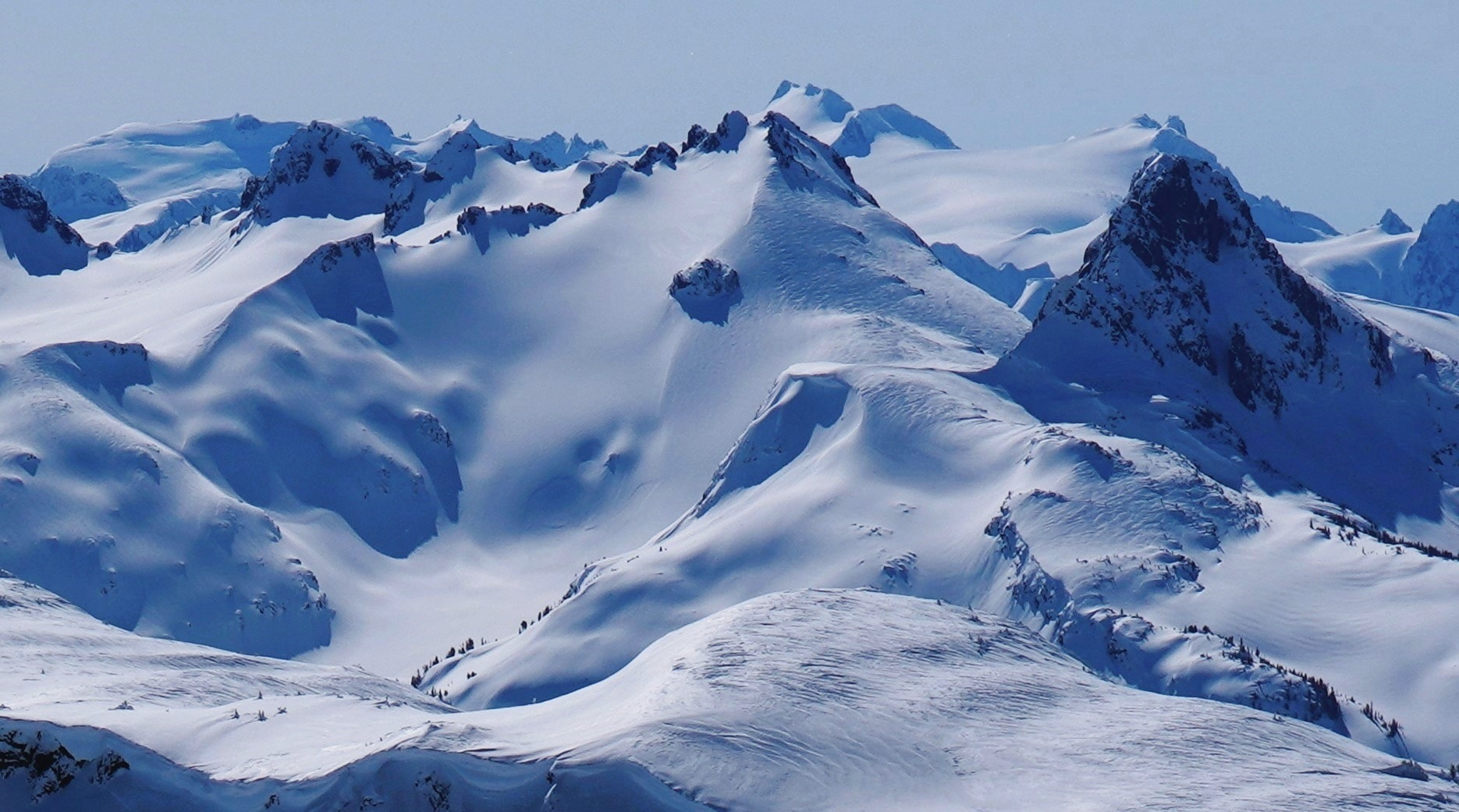
Deception Peak centered, northwest aspect.

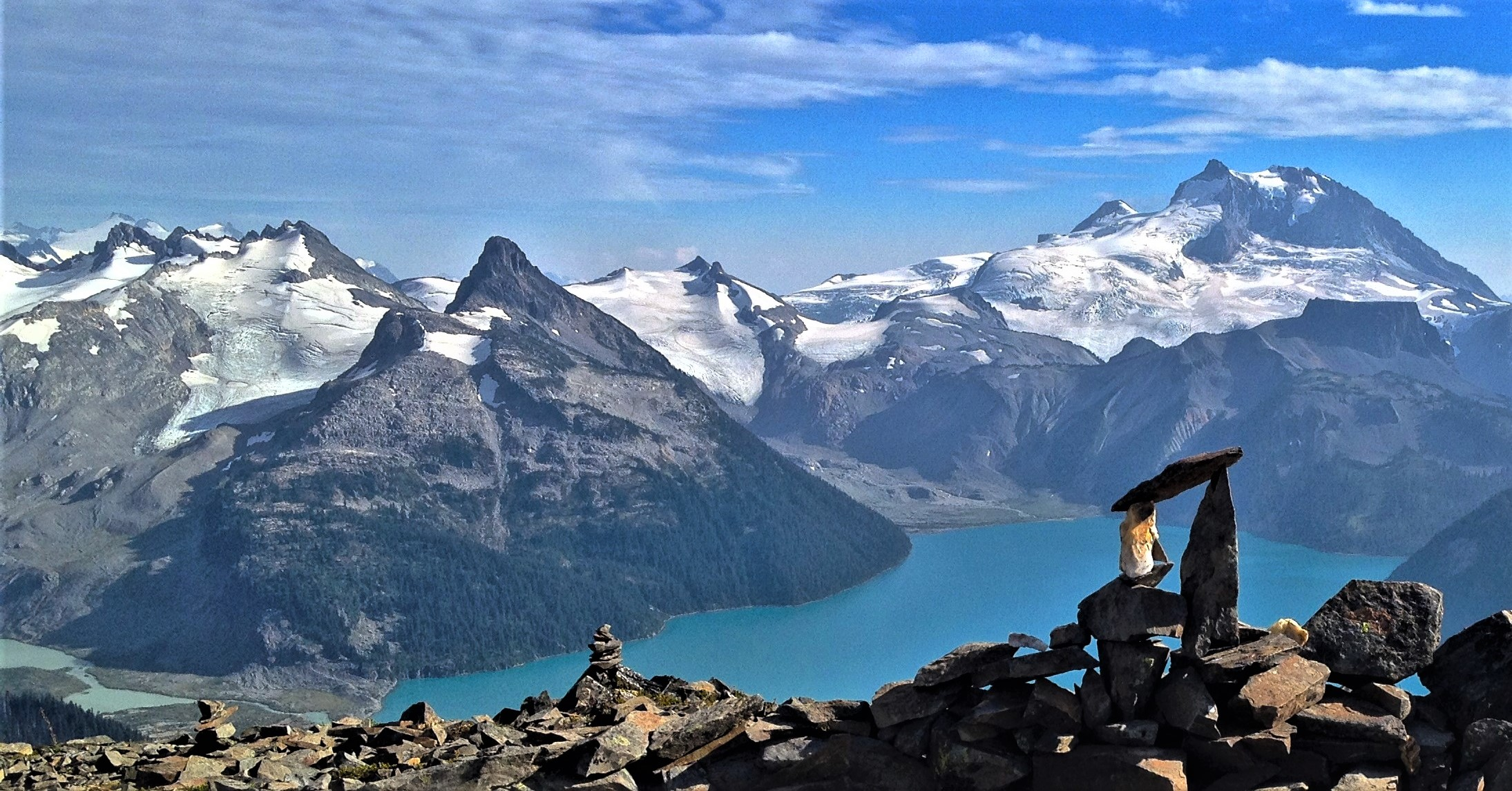
Deception Peak (left), Guard Mountain, and Mount Garibaldi (right) from Panorama Ridge

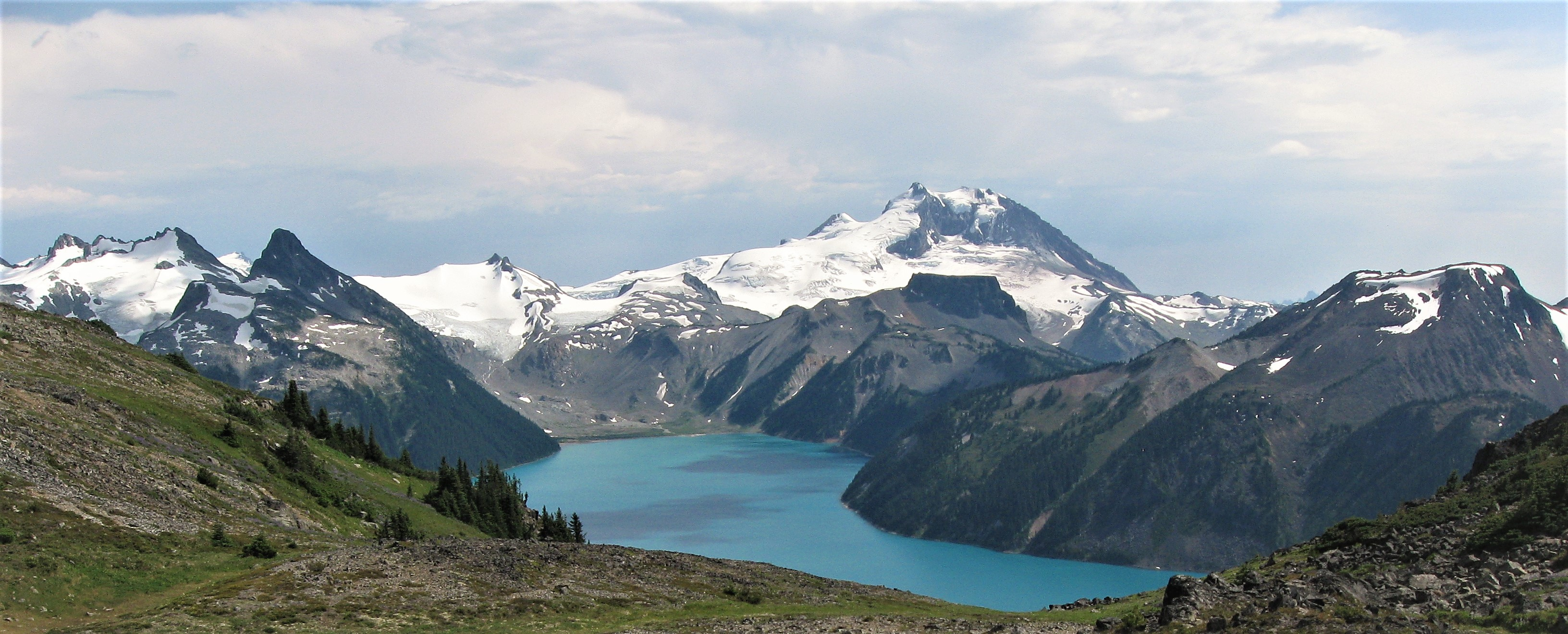
Deception Peak (left), Guard Mountain, Glacier Pikes, The Table, Mt. Garibaldi, and Mount Price (right) viewed from Panorama Ridge

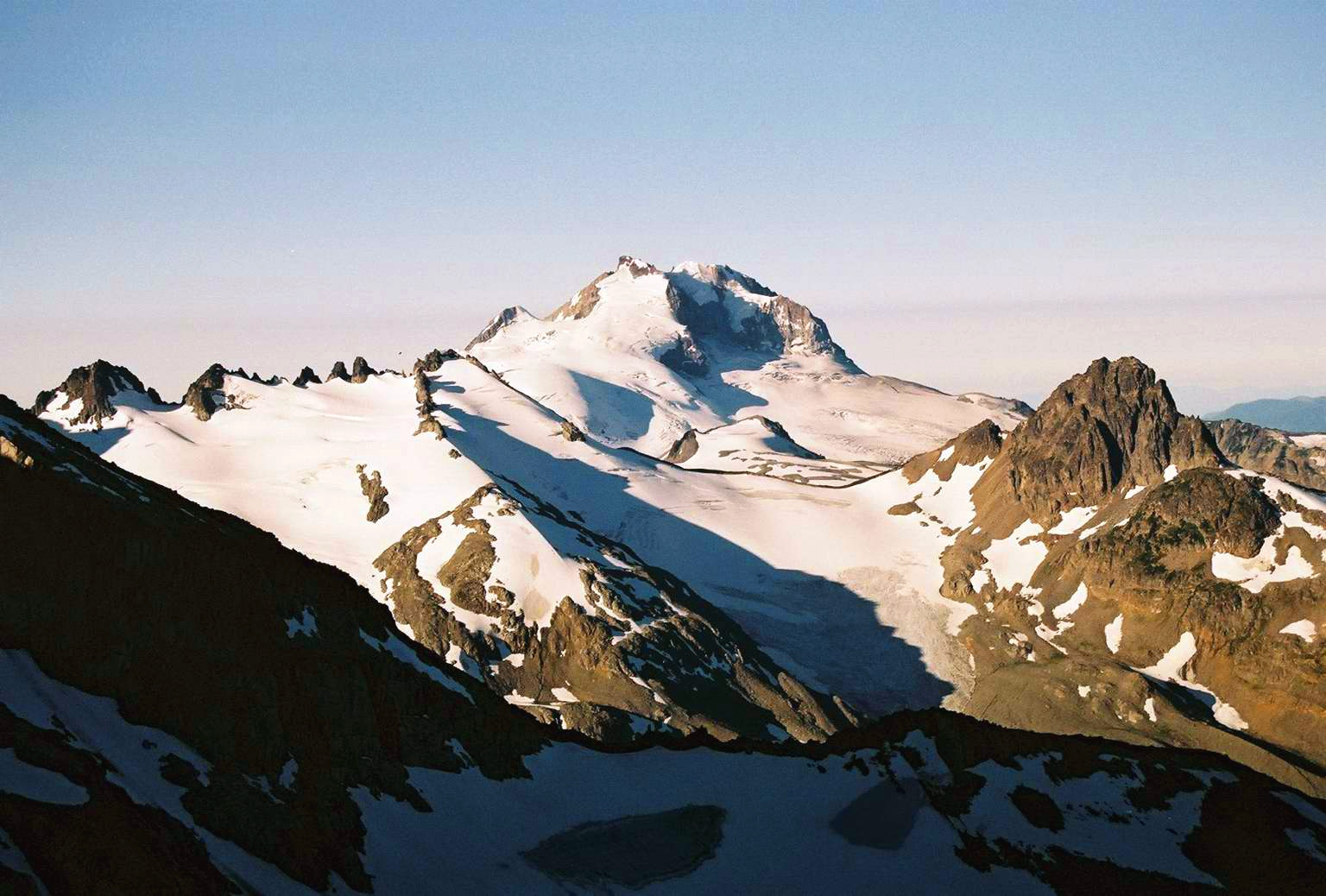
Deception Peak (left), Mt. Garibaldi (center), Guard Mountain (right)

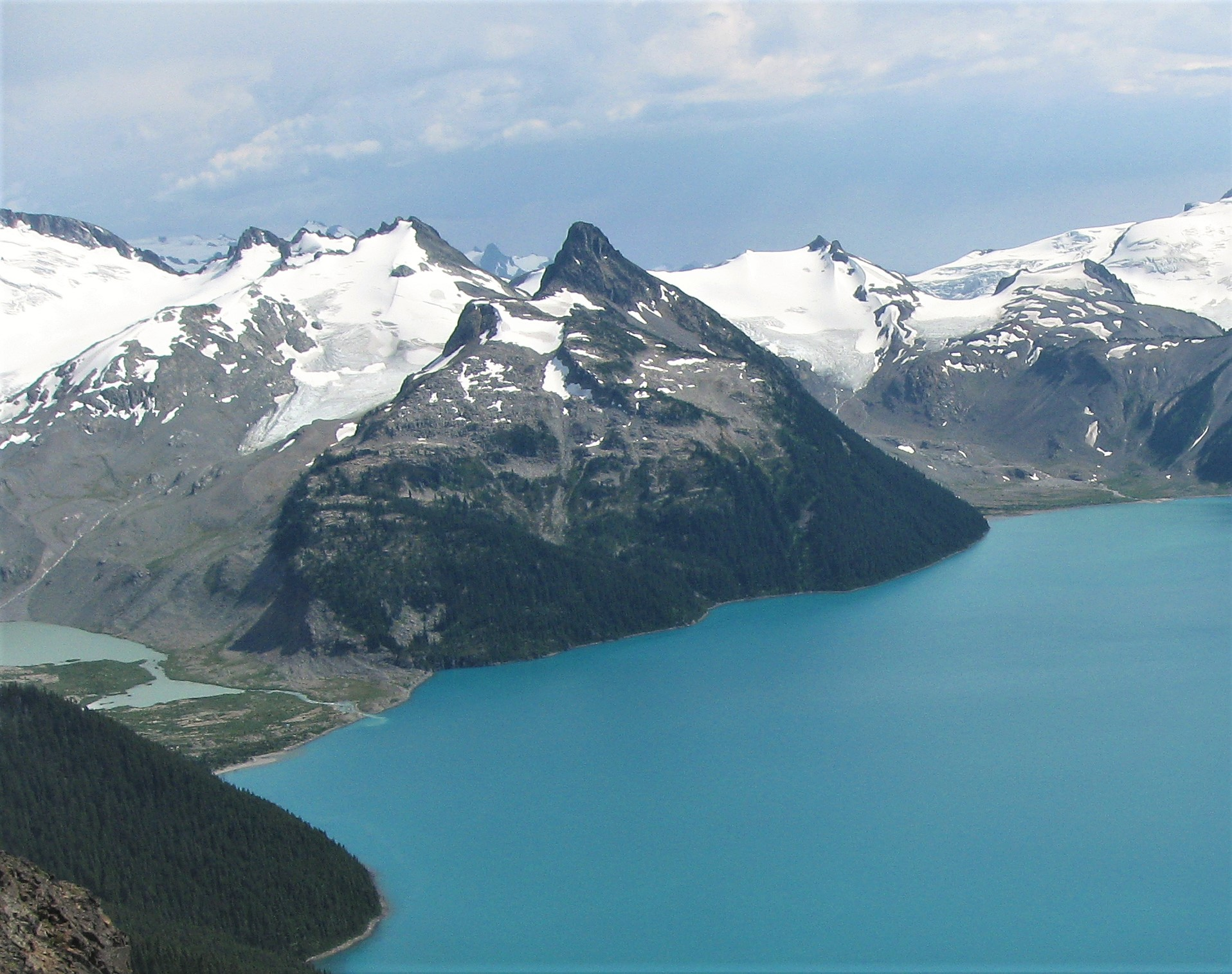
Guard Mountain (centre) with Deception Peak to immediate left

== See also ==
- Geography of British Columbia
