= Glacier Pikes =

Mountain in British Columbia, Canada

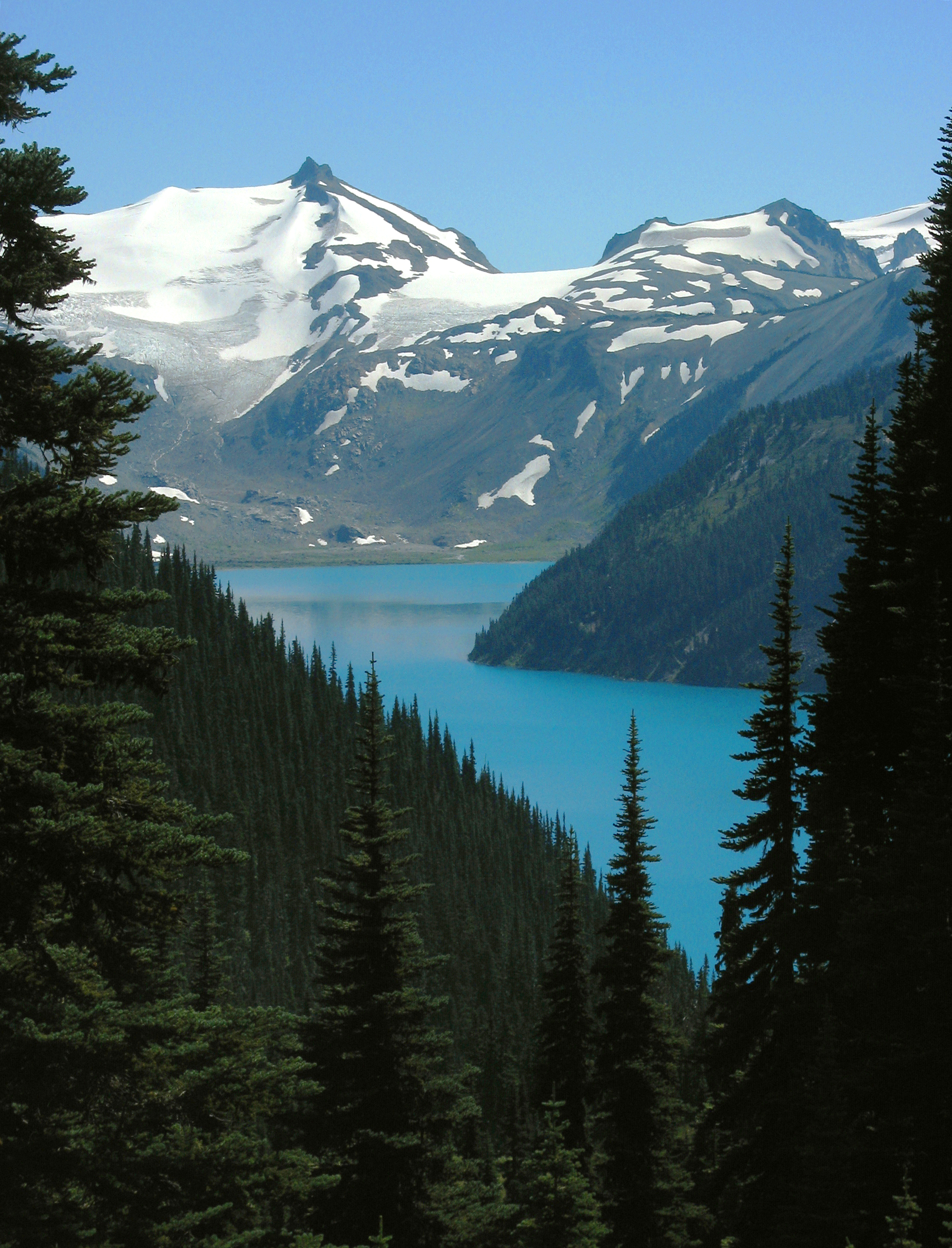
- Glacier Pikes (upper left)

Highest point
- Elevation: 2,145 m (7,037 ft)
- Prominence: 247 m (810 ft)
- Coordinates: 49°52′46″N 122°58′44″W

Geography
- Location within British Columbia
- Interactive map of Glacier Pikes
- Country: Canada
- Province: British Columbia
- District: New Westminster Land District
- Protected area: Garibaldi Provincial Park
- Parent range: Garibaldi Ranges
- Topo map: NTS 92G15 Mamquam Mountain

Geology
- Rock age: Pleistocene
- Mountain type: Lava dome
- Last eruption: Pleistocene

Climbing
- First ascent: 1911 BCMC Party
- Easiest route: Scramble

Glacier Pikes is a lava dome, located in the Garibaldi Lake volcanic field, British Columbia, Canada. The dome has two rocky points at the southern end of the Sentinel Glacier Neve. It is located within Garibaldi Provincial Park and is part of the Garibaldi Ranges of the Coast Mountains. The mountain's toponym was officially adopted on May 3, 1951, by the Geographical Names Board of Canada.

== Climate ==
Based on the Köppen climate classification, Glacier Pikes is located in the marine west coast climate zone of western North America. Most weather fronts originate in the Pacific Ocean, and travel east toward the Coast Mountains where they are forced upward by the range (Orographic lift), causing them to drop their moisture in the form of rain or snowfall. As a result, the Coast Mountains experience high precipitation, especially during the winter months in the form of snowfall. Winter temperatures can drop below −20 °C with wind chill factors below −30 °C.

== Gallery ==
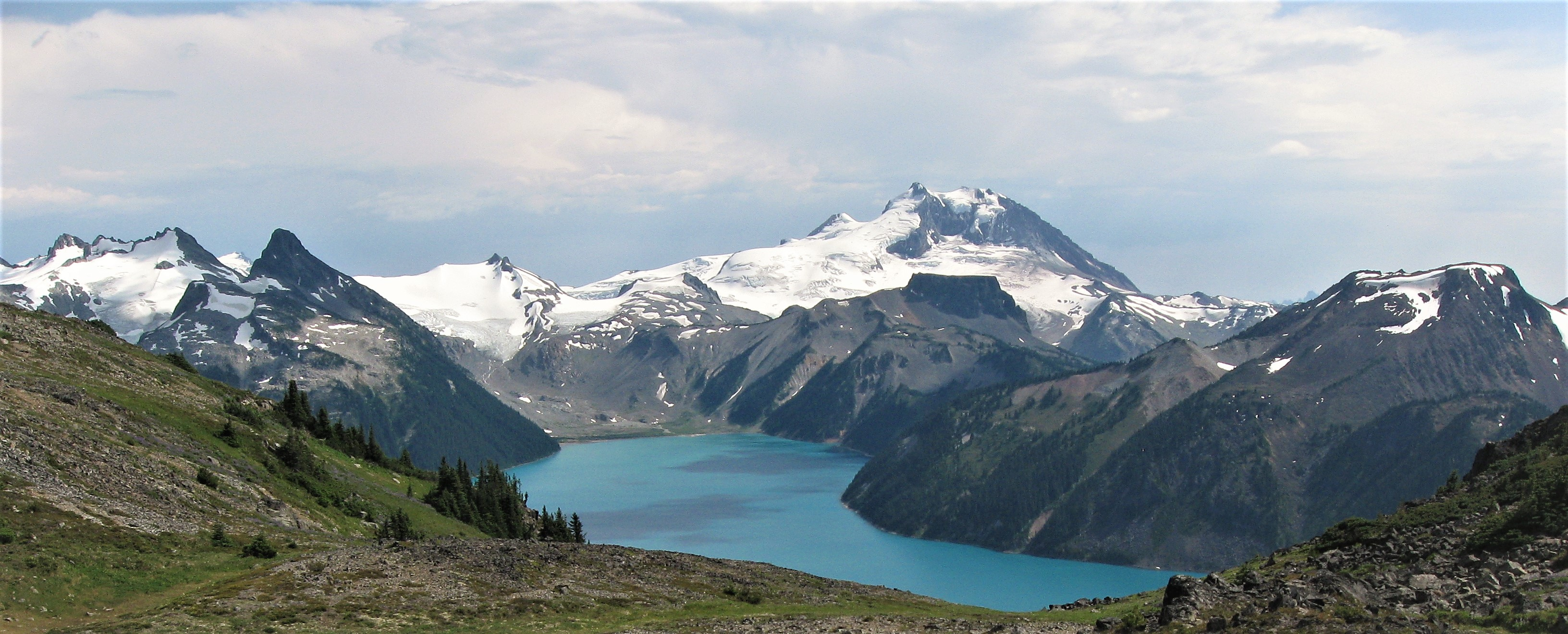
View from Panorama Ridge with Guard Mountain (left), Glacier Pikes, Garibaldi Lake, The Table, Mt. Garibaldi, and Mount Price (right)

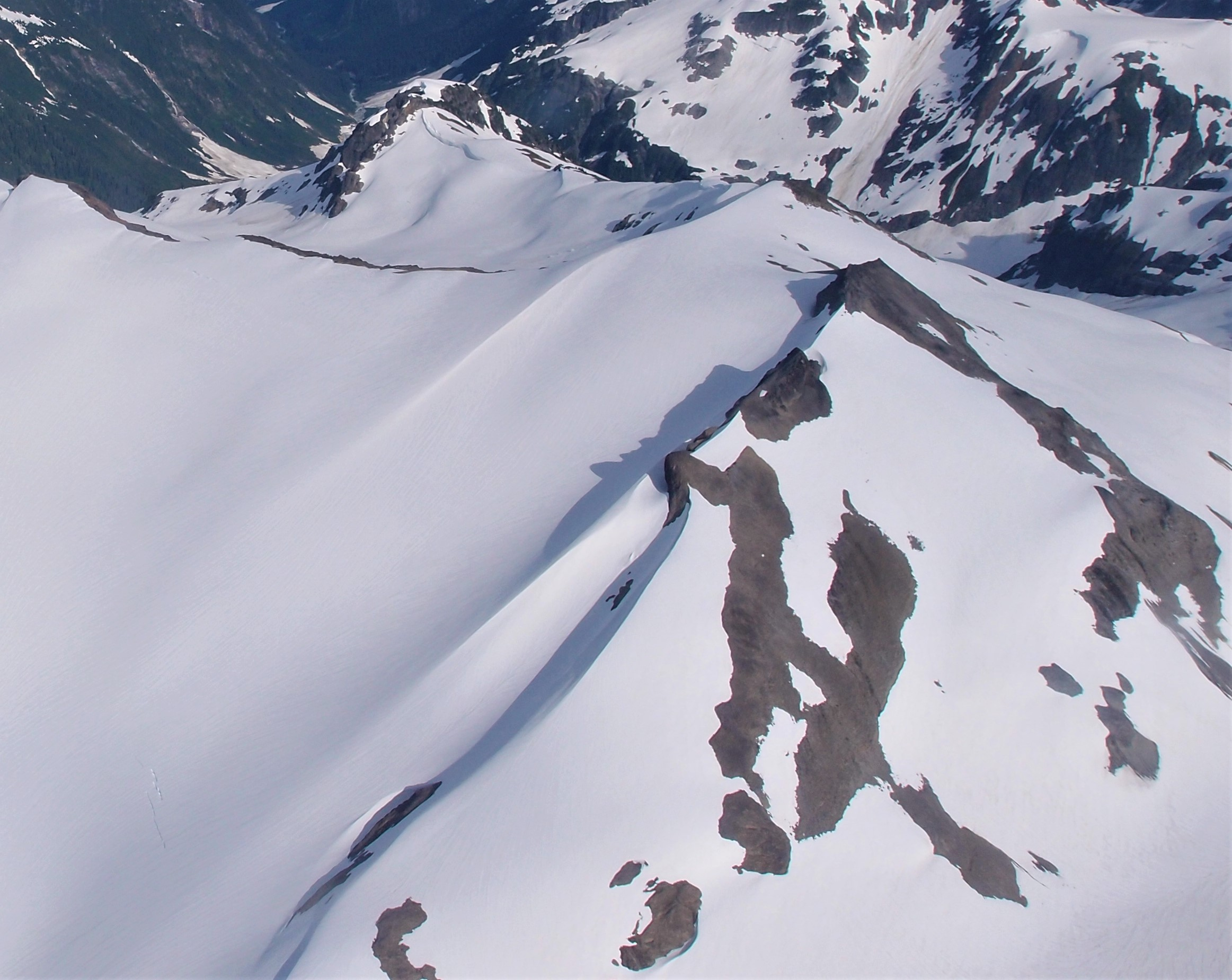
Aerial view looking southeast down at Glacier Pikes summit.

== See also ==
- List of volcanoes in Canada
- Volcanism of Canada
- Volcanism of Western Canada
