= Guard Mountain =

Mountain in the country of Canada

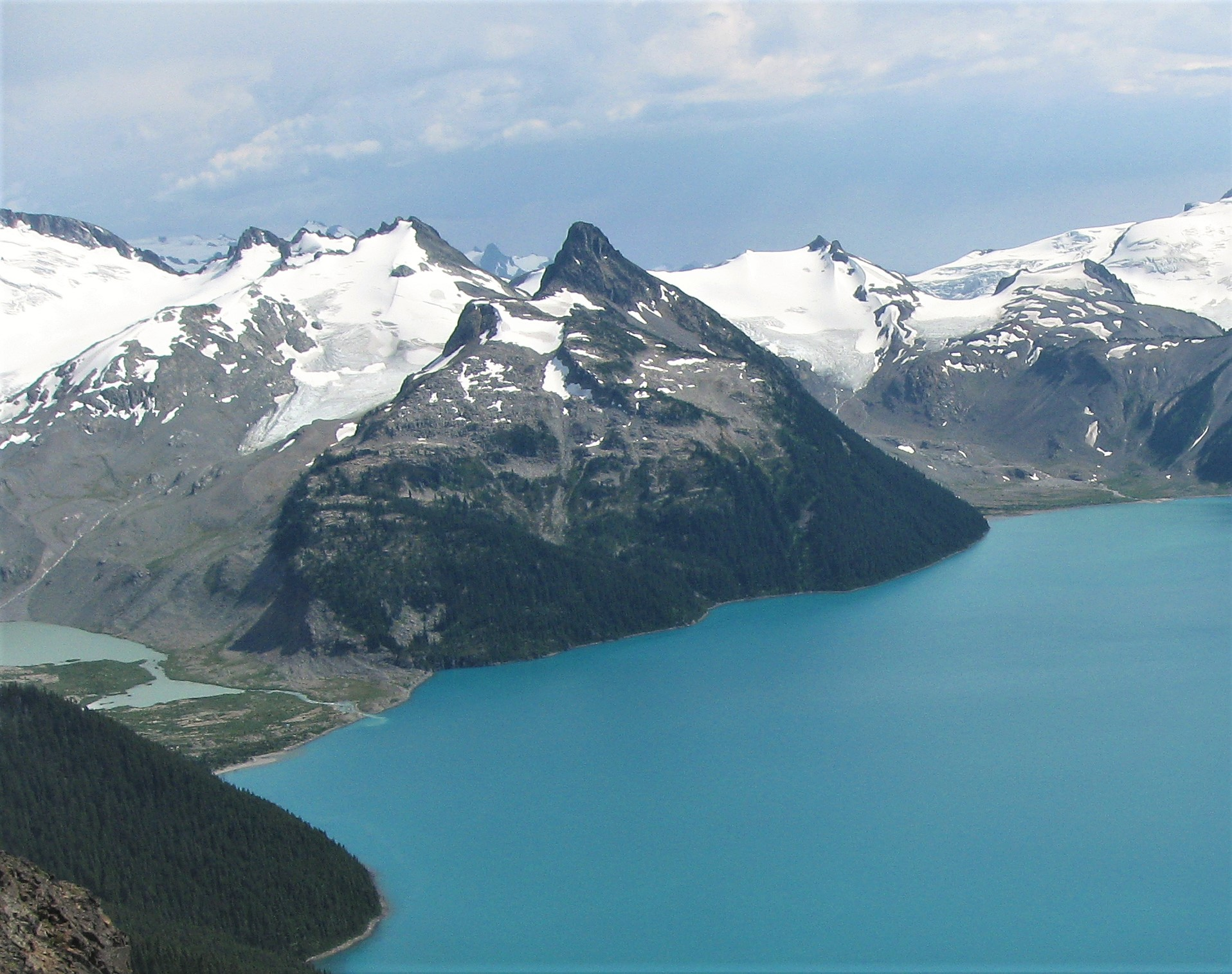
- North-northwest aspect, centered (Viewed from Panorama Ridge)

Highest point
- Elevation: 2,177 m (7,142 ft)
- Prominence: 203 m (666 ft)
- Parent peak: Castle Towers Mountain
- Isolation: 1.23 km (0.76 mi)
- Listing: Mountains of British Columbia
- Coordinates: 49°54′31″N 122°59′08″W

Geography
- Location within British Columbia Location within Canada
- Interactive map of Guard Mountain
- Country: Canada
- Province: British Columbia
- District: New Westminster Land District
- Protected area: Garibaldi Provincial Park
- Parent range: Garibaldi Ranges; Coast Mountains
- Topo map: NTS 92G15 Mamquam Mountain

Guard Mountain is a 2,177-metre (7,142-foot) summit in British Columbia, Canada.

== Description ==
Guard Mountain is located within Garibaldi Provincial Park on the southeast side of Garibaldi Lake, and is part of the Garibaldi Ranges of the Coast Mountains. It is situated 70 km (43 mi) north of Vancouver, 4.28 km (3 mi) west-southwest of Mount Carr, and 4.63 km (3 mi) southwest of Castle Towers Mountain. Precipitation runoff from the peak drains into Garibaldi Lake and topographic relief is significant as the summit rises 700 meters (2,300 feet) above the lake in one kilometer (0.6 mile). The mountain's toponym was officially adopted on October 4, 1932, by the Geographical Names Board of Canada.

== Climate ==
Based on the Köppen climate classification, Guard Mountain is located in the marine west coast climate zone of western North America. Most weather fronts originate in the Pacific Ocean, and travel east toward the Coast Mountains where they are forced upward by the range (Orographic lift), causing them to drop their moisture in the form of rain or snowfall. As a result, the Coast Mountains experience high precipitation, especially during the winter months in the form of snowfall. Winter temperatures can drop below −20 °C with wind chill factors below −30 °C. This climate supports the Sphinx Glacier on the east side of the mountain.

== Gallery ==
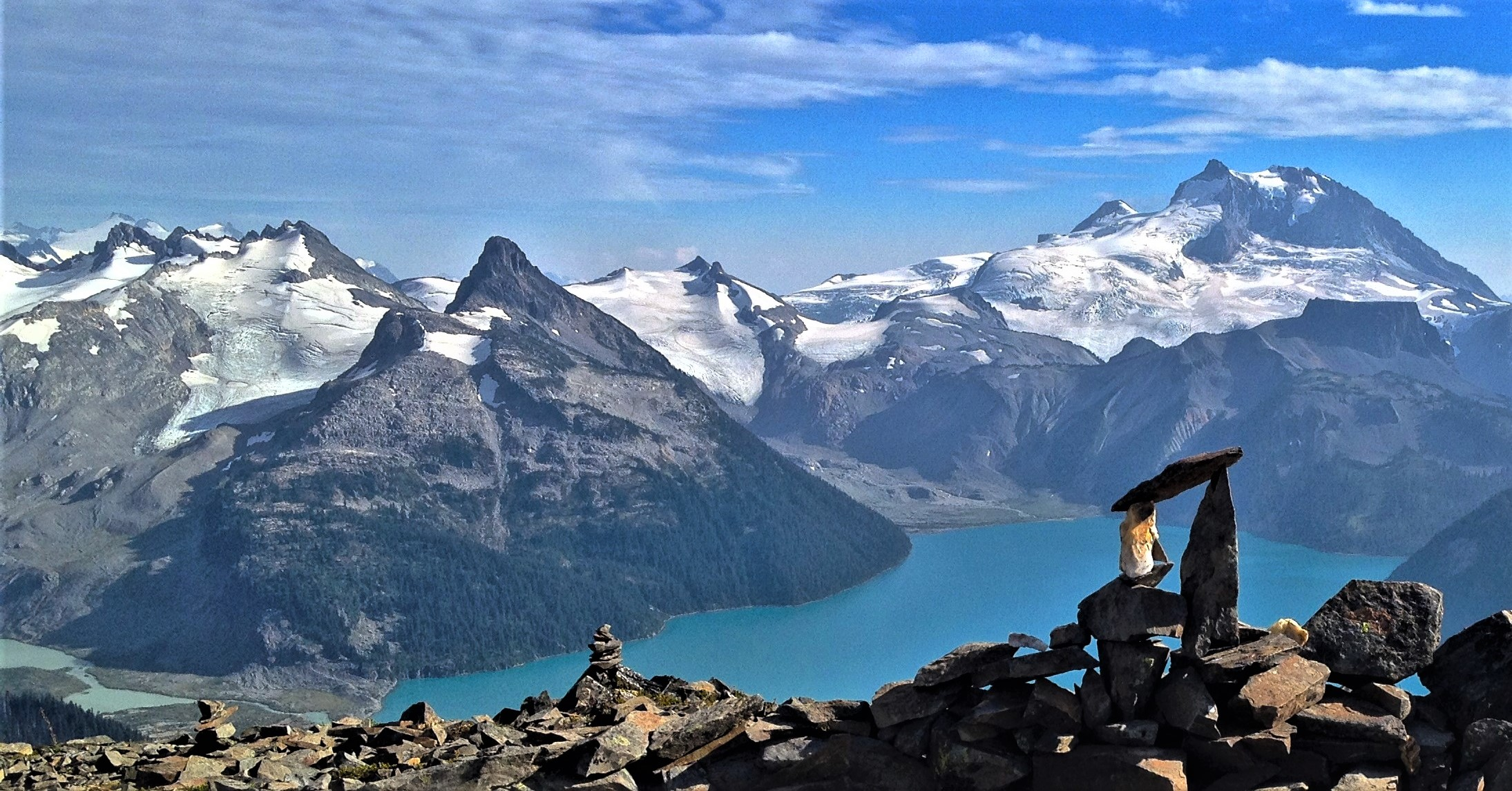
Guard Mountain (left) with Mount Garibaldi (right) from Panorama Ridge

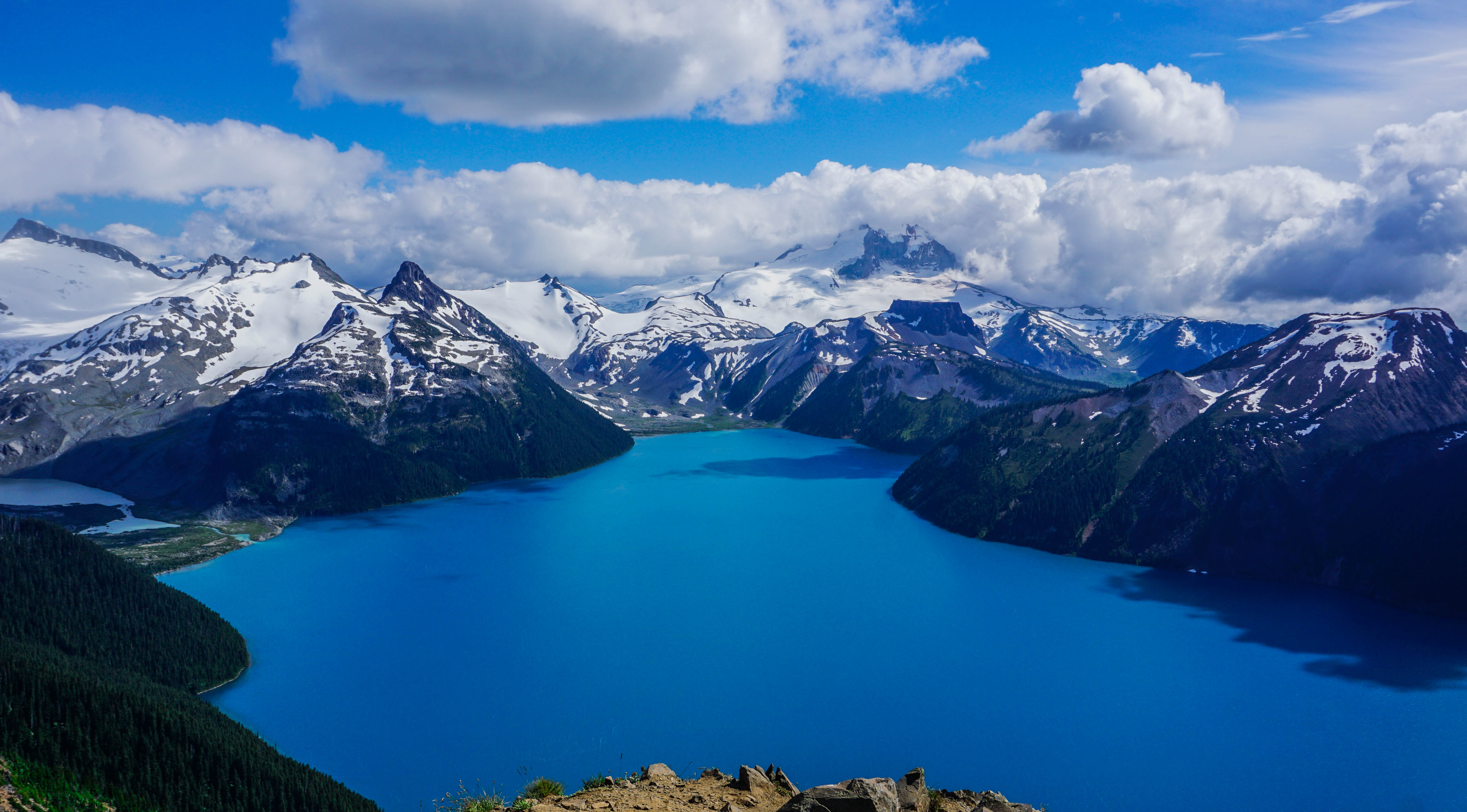
Garibaldi Lake with Guard Mountain (left of center)

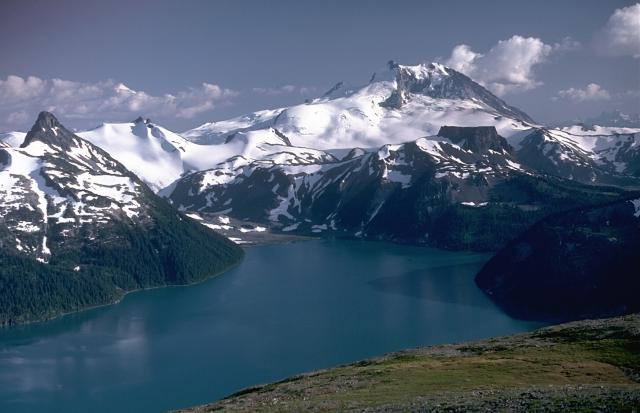
Guard Mountain (left) with Mount Garibaldi (right)

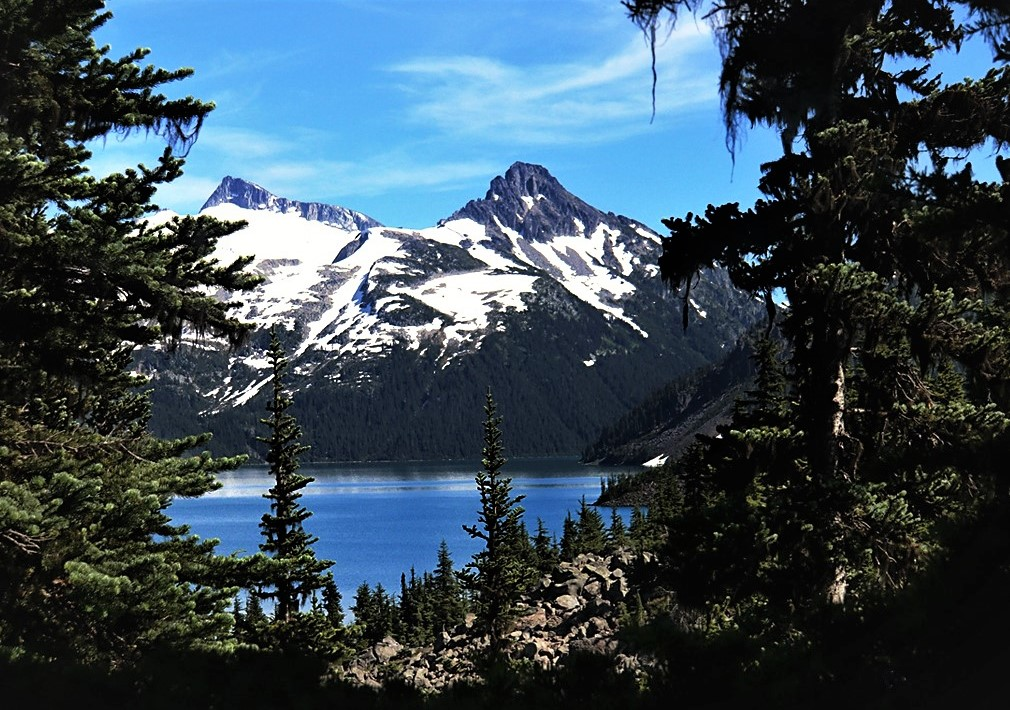
Guard Mountain (center) and The Sphinx (left) with Garibaldi Lake

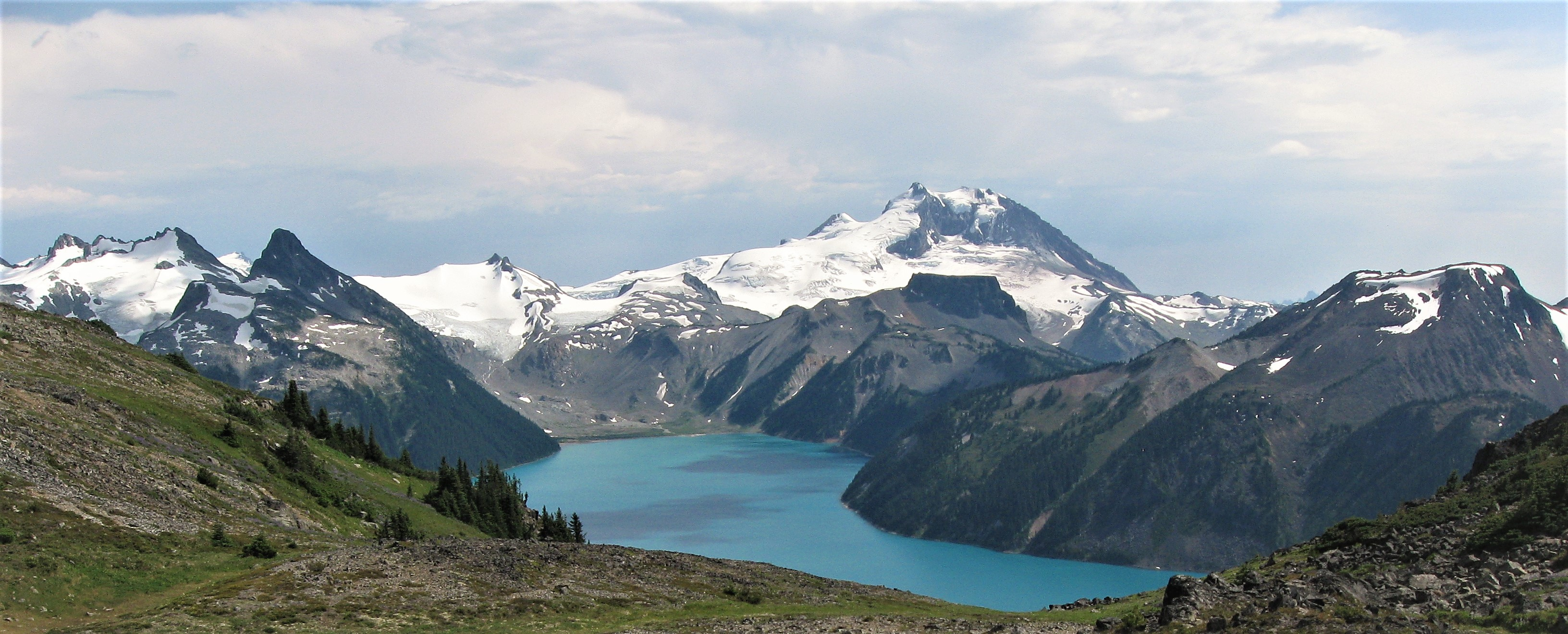
Guard Mountain (left), The Table, Mt. Garibaldi, and Mount Price (right) viewed from Panorama Ridge

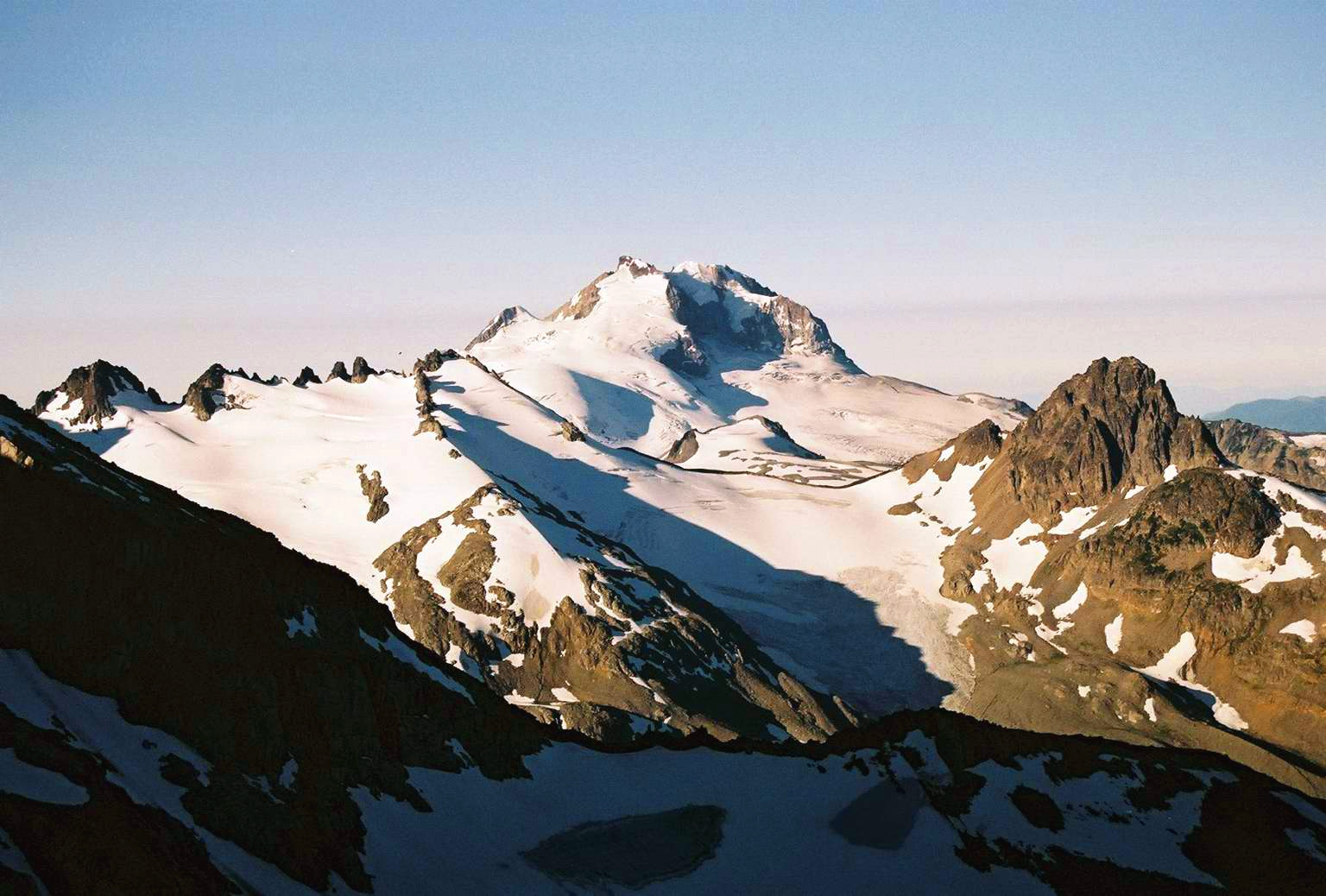
Deception Peak (left), Mt. Garibaldi (center), Guard Mountain (right)

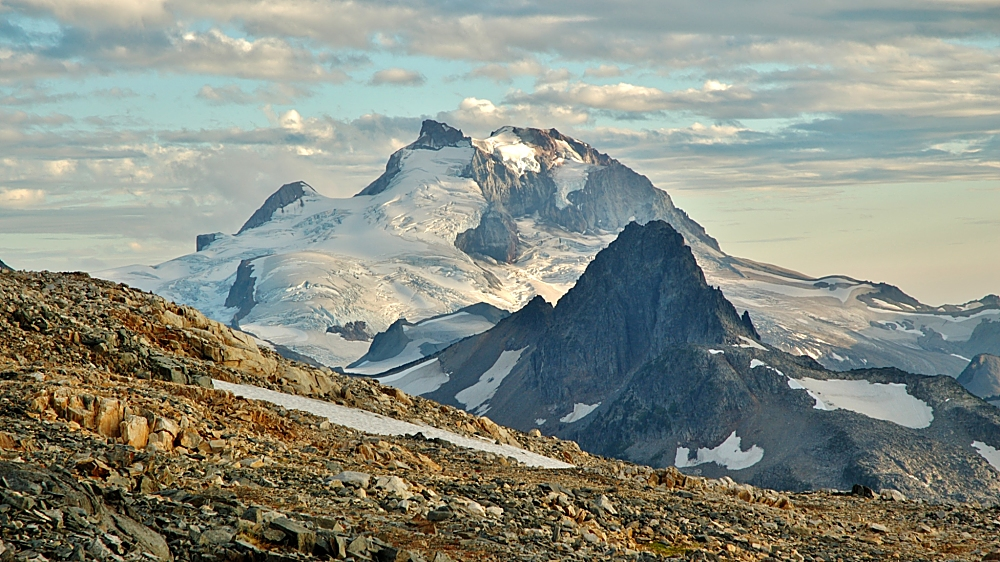
Guard Mountain and Mount Garibaldi

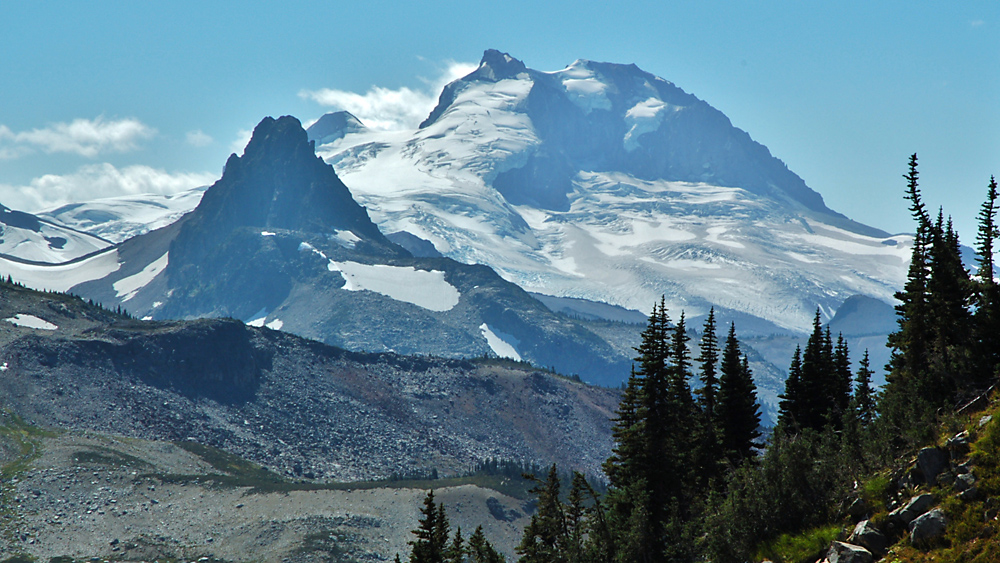
Guard Mountain and Mount Garibaldi

== See also ==
- Geography of British Columbia
