= Garibaldi, British Columbia =

Locality and ghost town in British Columbia, Canada

Garibaldi Former name: Daisy Lake; other names: Garibaldi Lodge, Garibaldi Townsite
- Locality and ghost town
- Location of Garibaldi in British Columbia
- Coordinates: 49.966667°N 123.15°W
- Country: Canada
- Province: British Columbia
- Townsite created: Early to mid-1910s
- Post office established: 1916
- Downgraded from community to locality: 1983
- Named for: Garibaldi Provincial Park
- Time zone: UTC−07:00 (PT)
- Forward sortation area: V0N
- Area codes: 250, 778

Garibaldi, originally named Daisy Lake and also known as Garibaldi Lodge and Garibaldi Townsite, is a locality and ghost town in British Columbia, Canada, on the Cheakamus River around its confluence with Rubble Creek and just south of Daisy Lake. The CN railway (formerly BC Rail) and British Columbia Highway 99 traverses it north–south.

Although some buildings remain, including public works facilities, the community is now officially depopulated due to the geohazard posed by The Barrier, a lava dam holding back Garibaldi Lake that has collapsed at various points in the past; Rubble Creek, the source of which is Garibaldi Lake, gets its name from the large boulder field created by successive degenerations of The Barrier.

== History ==
The townsite had come into existence shortly after the opening of the Pacific Great Eastern Railway, with its post office opening in 1916, and it had been the site of Garibaldi Lodge, one of several railway lodges along the rail line, the most well known in this locality being Rainbow Lodge at Alta Lake. The settlement's name was changed from Daisy Lake to Garibaldi in 1932 by dint of association with the intended main basetown for Garibaldi Provincial Park.

Plans for a ski development at this location were ended when the evacuation was ordered in 1980. Property owners and residents of the townsite were ordered by the provincial government to evacuate Garibaldi amid much public controversy as to whether it was really necessary or not. To compensate property owners, lots were offered in the new Pinecrest and Black Tusk Estates subdivisions a bit further north, and out of the way of the debris path from the Barrier. The name of Garibaldi Lifts Company, the founding company of what is now Whistler Blackcomb, was chosen in anticipation that Garibaldi would be the major resort in this area.

A new all-season ski resort complex received approval from the provincial government in January 2016, a $3.5 billion project that will take twenty years to complete. It will be fifteen kilometers north of Squamish on Brohm Ridge, which is just 1.6 kilometers west of Mount Garibaldi and 4.3 kilometers south of Garibaldi Lake. It will include ski lifts and runs alongside multi-purpose hiking and biking trails. The main facility will include a car-free village with housing, restaurants, and shops linked to Squamish by transit. Aquilini Investment Group vice president Jim Chu said the benefits of the project will include 4,000 jobs to operate the resort, 2,000 to build it, millions of dollars in tourism-related activity, and $49 million in tax revenue.

== See also ==
- Mount Garibaldi
- Garibaldi Névé
- Garibaldi Provincial Park
