= Gentian Peak =

Mountain in the country of Canada

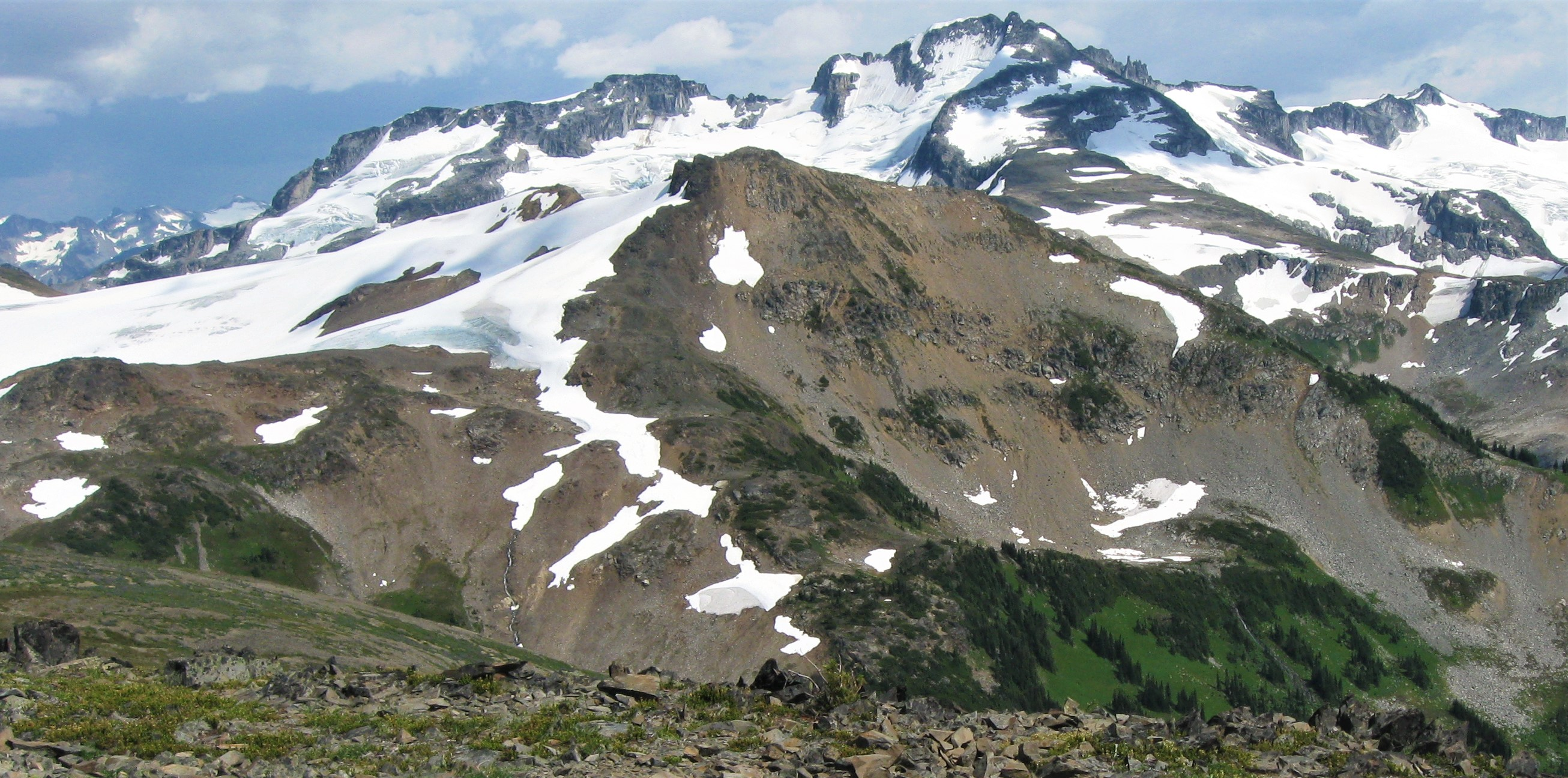
- West aspect, centered, from Panorama Ridge (Castle Towers Mountain behind)

Highest point
- Elevation: 2,197 m (7,208 ft)
- Prominence: 127 m (417 ft)
- Parent peak: Corrie Ridge
- Isolation: 1.58 km (0.98 mi)
- Listing: Mountains of British Columbia
- Coordinates: 49°57′05″N 122°59′24″W

Naming
- Etymology: Gentiana

Geography
- Location within British Columbia Location within Canada
- Interactive map of Gentian Peak
- Country: Canada
- Province: British Columbia
- District: New Westminster Land District
- Protected area: Garibaldi Provincial Park
- Parent range: Garibaldi Ranges; Coast Mountains
- Topo map: NTS 92G15 Mamquam Mountain

Climbing
- Easiest route: Scrambling

Gentian Peak is a 2,197-metre (7,208-foot) summit in British Columbia, Canada.

== Description ==
Gentian Peak is located within Garibaldi Provincial Park on the northeast side of Garibaldi Lake, and is part of the Garibaldi Ranges of the Coast Mountains. It is situated 77 km (48 mi) north of Vancouver and 3 km (2 mi) west of Castle Towers Mountain. Precipitation runoff from the peak drains south into Garibaldi Lake and north into Helm and Castle Towers creeks, all of which is within the Cheakamus River watershed. Topographic relief is significant as the summit rises 720 meters (2,362 feet) above the lake in 1.5 km (1 mi). The mountain's toponym was officially adopted on September 2, 1930, by the Geographical Names Board of Canada and refers to a rare species of Gentian flowering plant found in the vicinity.

== Climate ==
Based on the Köppen climate classification, Gentian Peak is located in the marine west coast climate zone of western North America. Weather fronts originating in the Pacific Ocean travel east toward the Coast Mountains where they are forced upward by the range (Orographic lift), causing them to drop their moisture in the form of rain or snowfall. As a result, the Coast Mountains experience high precipitation, especially during the winter months in the form of snowfall. Winter temperatures can drop below −20 °C with wind chill factors below −30 °C. This climate supports the Helm Glacier on the north slope of the peak.

== Gallery ==
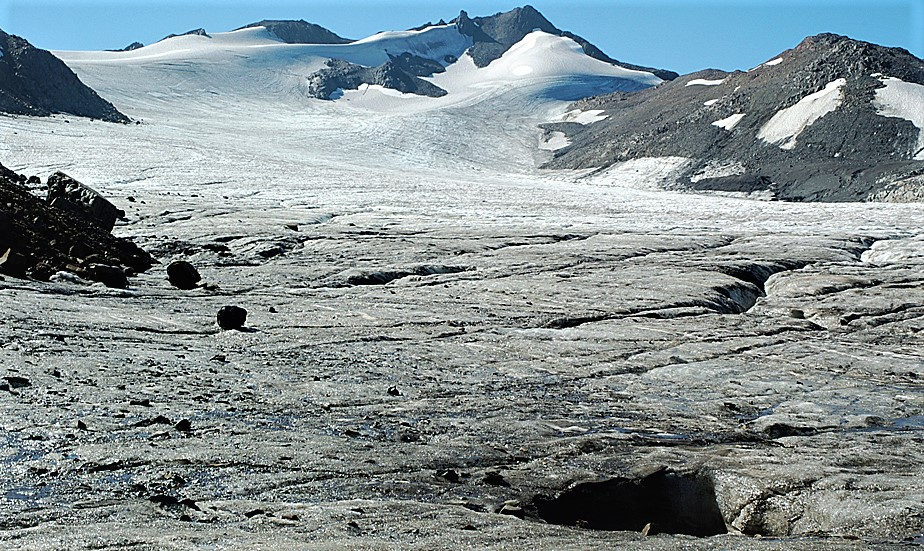
Helm Glacier with north aspect of Gentian Peak

== See also ==
- Geography of British Columbia
