= Mount Carr =

Mountain in British Columbia, Canada

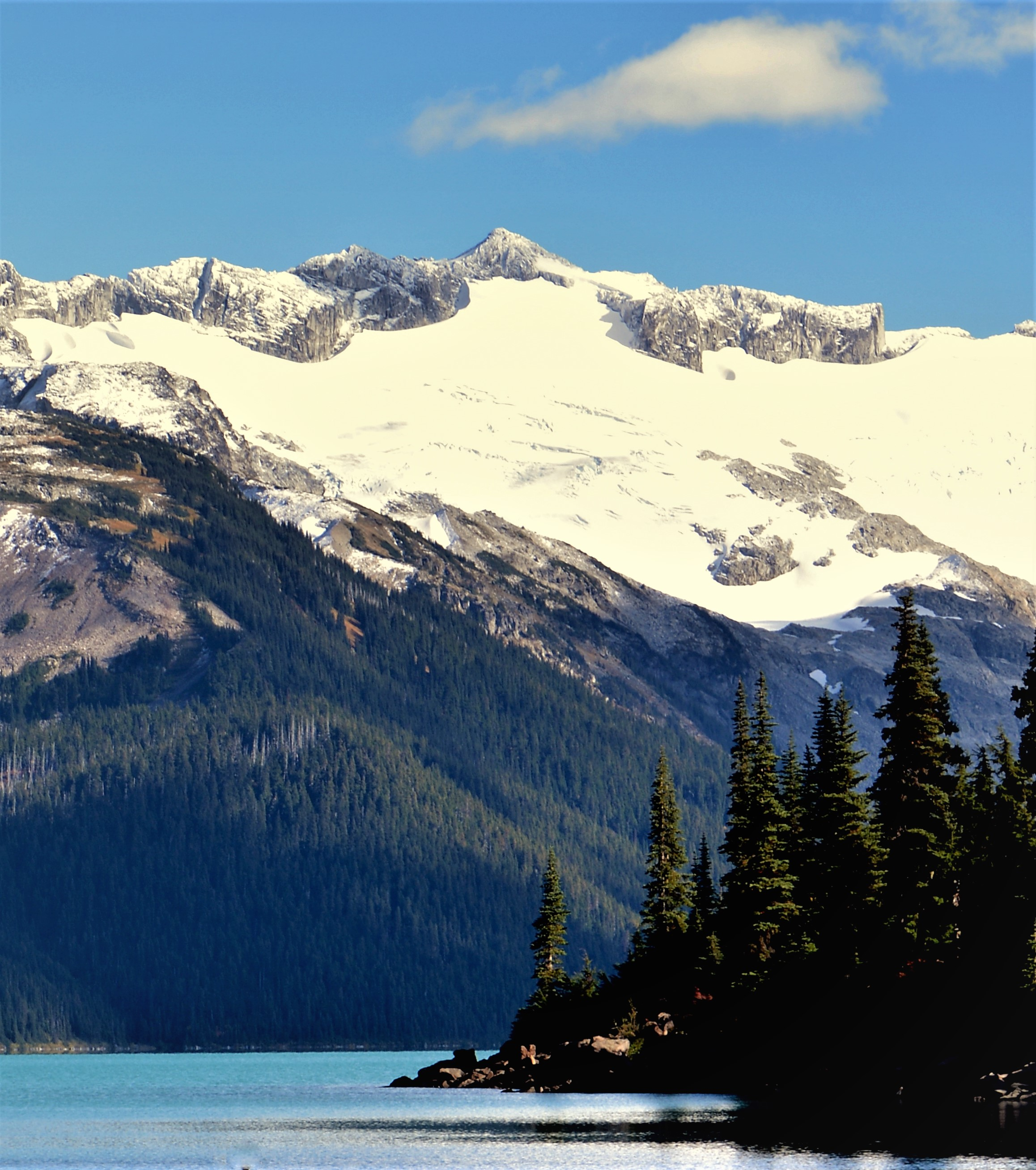
- West aspect, from Garibaldi Lake

Highest point
- Elevation: 2,590 m (8,497 ft)
- Prominence: 133 m (436 ft)
- Parent peak: Castle Towers Mountain
- Isolation: 1.61 km (1.00 mi)
- Listing: Mountains of British Columbia
- Coordinates: 49°55′27″N 122°55′52″W

Naming
- Etymology: Pvt. Frank Edward Carr

Geography
- Location within British Columbia Location within Canada
- Interactive map of Mount Carr
- Country: Canada
- Province: British Columbia
- District: New Westminster Land District
- Protected area: Garibaldi Provincial Park
- Parent range: Garibaldi Ranges; Coast Mountains
- Topo map: NTS 92G15 Mamquam Mountain

Climbing
- First ascent: 1911
- Easiest route: via Sphinx Glacier

Mount Carr is a 2,590-metre (8,497-foot) mountain summit located in British Columbia, Canada.

== Description ==
Mount Carr is set within Garibaldi Provincial Park and is part of the Garibaldi Ranges of the Coast Mountains. It is situated 70 km (43 mi) north of Vancouver and 2 km (1 mi) south-southeast of line parent Castle Towers Mountain. Precipitation runoff and glacial meltwater from the west side of the peak drains to Garibaldi Lake, and the eastern slope drains to Cheakamus Lake. Topographic relief is significant as the summit rises 1,440 meters (4,724 feet) above Isosceles Creek in 4 kilometers (2.5 miles).

== History ==
The peak is named after Frank Edward Carr (1886–1915), Vancouver post office clerk and British Columbia Mountaineering Club executive member, who served with the 7th Battalion, Canadian Expeditionary Forces, in Canada, England and France during World War I. He was killed in action April 26, 1915, in France and is commemorated at the Menin Gate Memorial to the Missing in Belgium. The toponym was officially adopted September 2, 1930, by the Geographical Names Board of Canada.

The first ascent of Mt. Carr, which at the time was known as Copper Peak, was made in 1911 by a large BC Mountaineering Club party including Don Munday.

== Climate ==
Based on the Köppen climate classification, Mount Carr is located in the marine west coast climate zone of western North America. Most weather fronts originate in the Pacific Ocean, and travel east toward the Coast Mountains where they are forced upward by the range (Orographic lift), causing them to drop their moisture in the form of rain or snowfall. As a result, the Coast Mountains experience high precipitation, especially during the winter months in the form of snowfall. Winter temperatures can drop below −20 °C with wind chill factors below −30 °C. This climate supports the Sphinx Glacier on the west slope, Gray Glacier on the east, and the Cheakamus Glacier on the north slope.

== Gallery ==
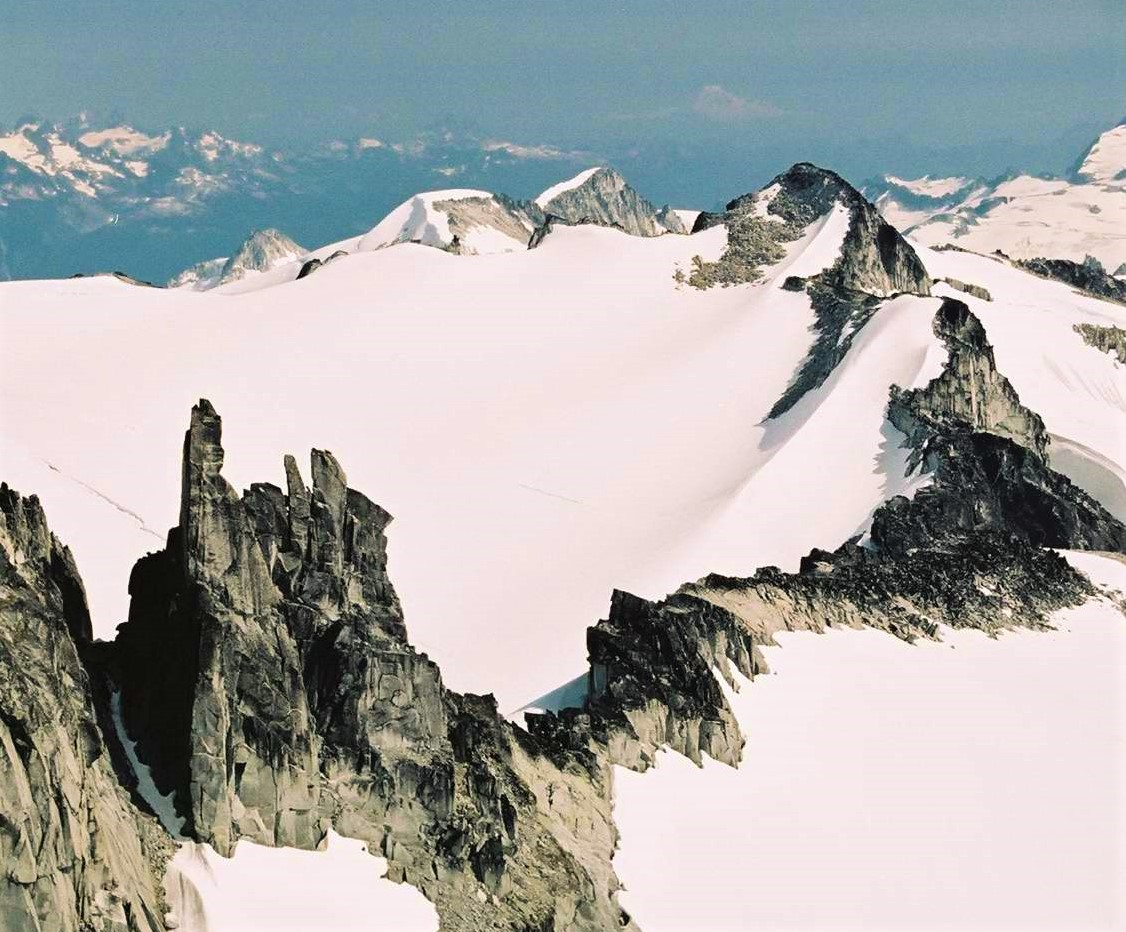
Phyllis's Engine (lower left) and Mount Carr (upper right)

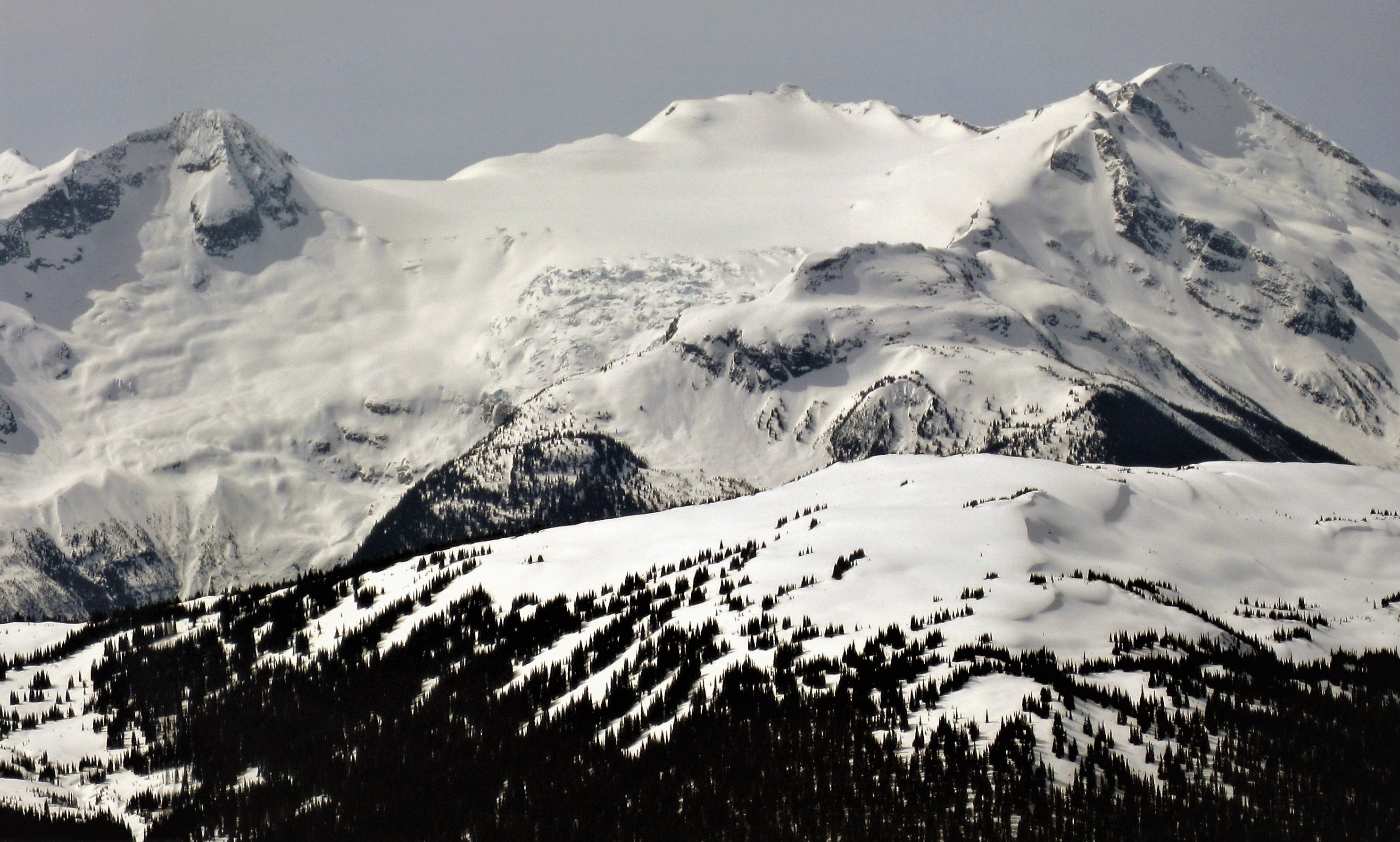
Mount Davidson (left), Mount Carr (center) above Cheakamus Glacier, and Castle Towers Mountain (right). North aspect.

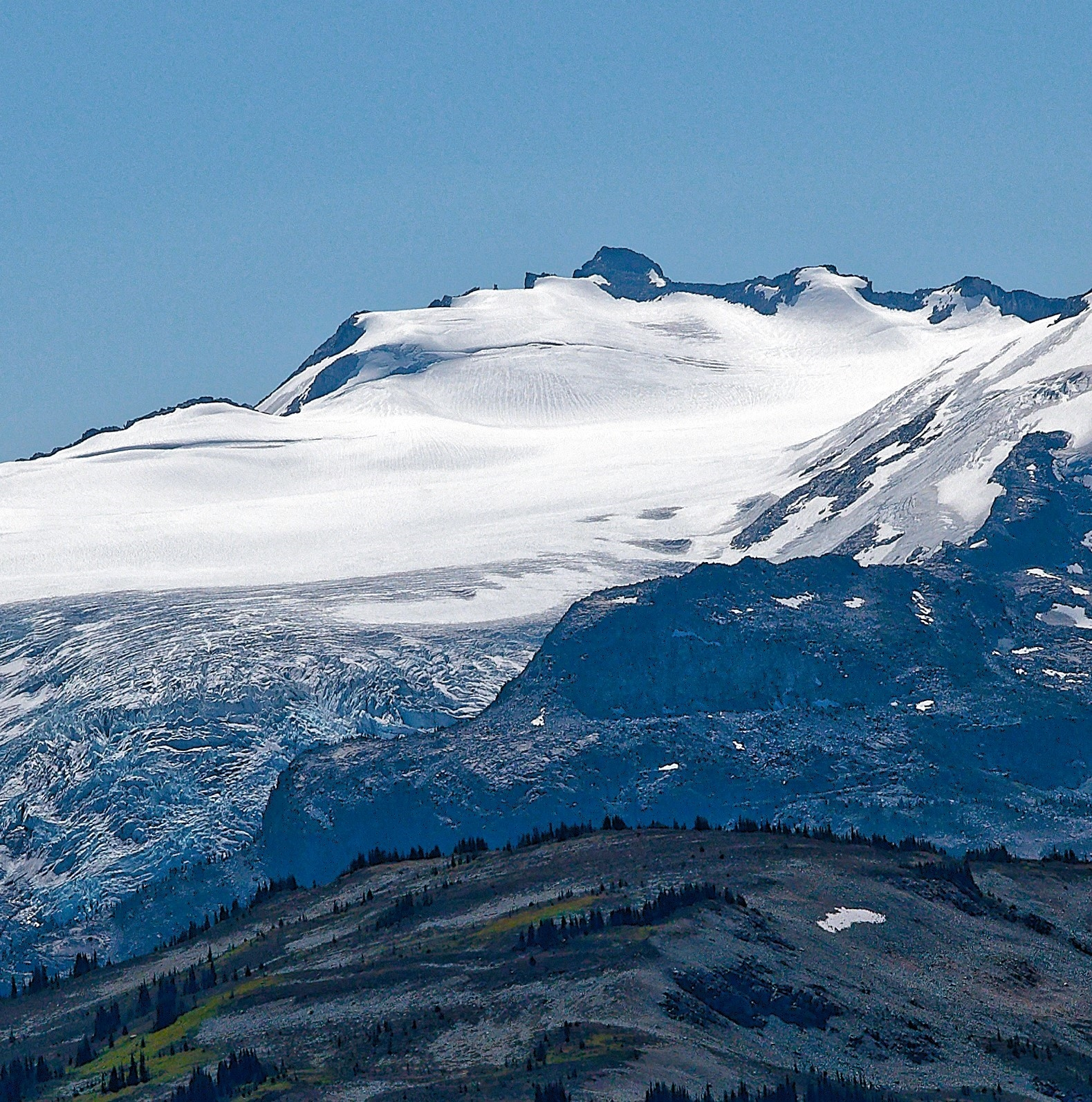
North aspect above Cheakamus Glacier, viewed from Whistler Mountain

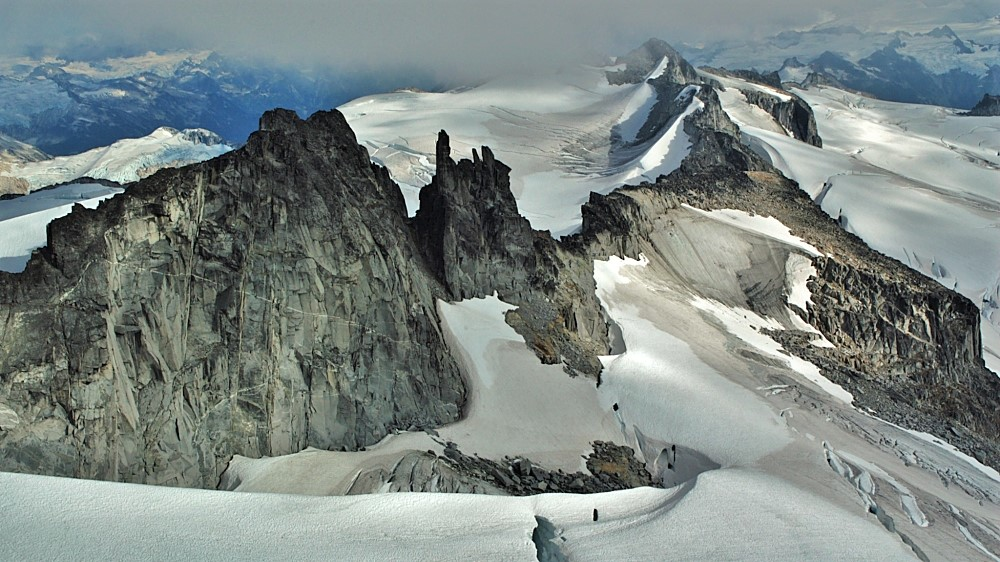
Mt. Carr (top, right of center) with Phyllis's Engine, centered, viewed from west summit of Castle Towers Mountain.

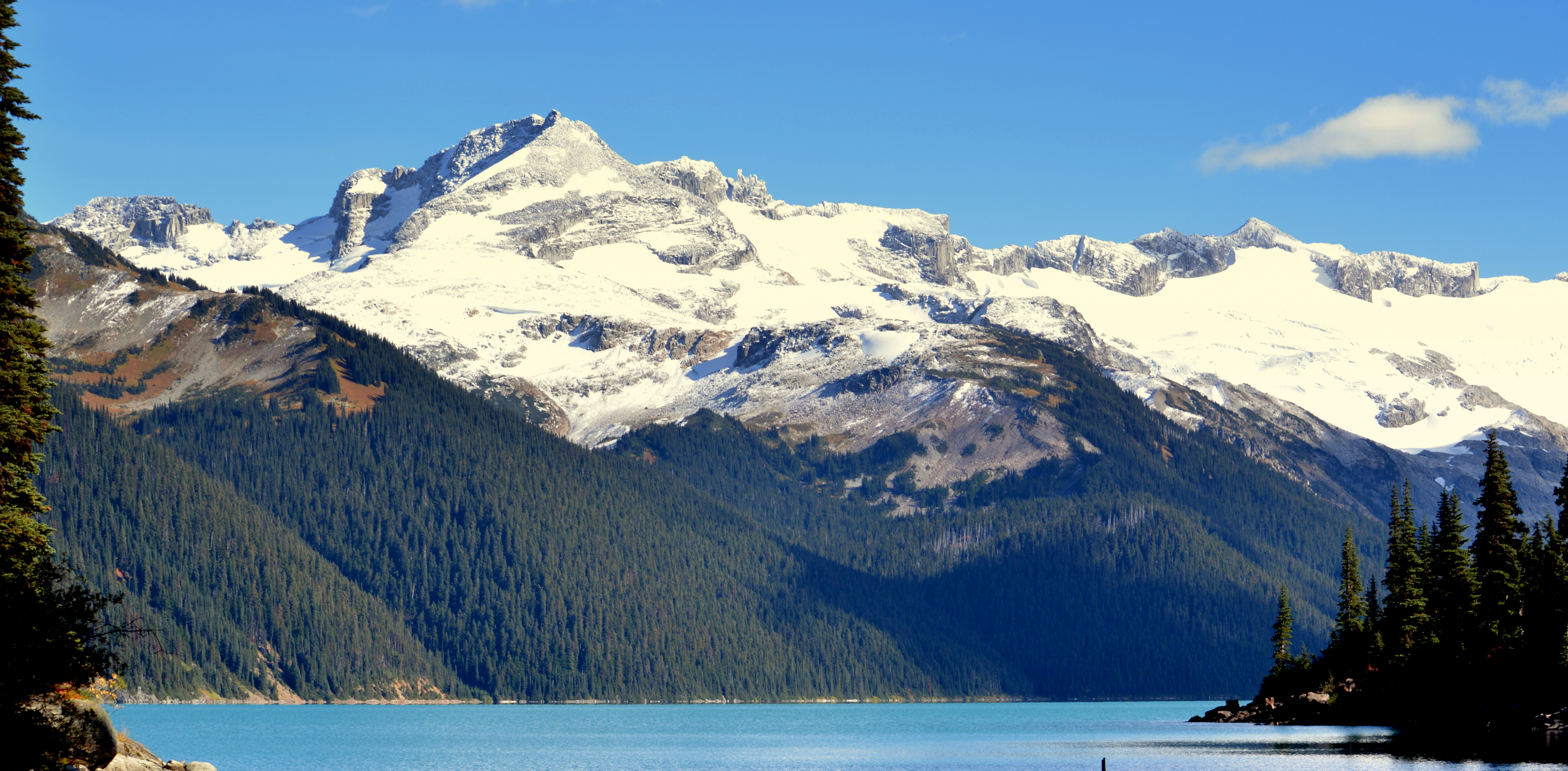
Castle Towers Mountain (left of center), Phyllis's Engine (center), Mt. Carr (right) viewed from Garibaldi Lake.

== See also ==
- Geography of British Columbia
