= The Sphinx (British Columbia) =

Mountain in British Columbia, Canada

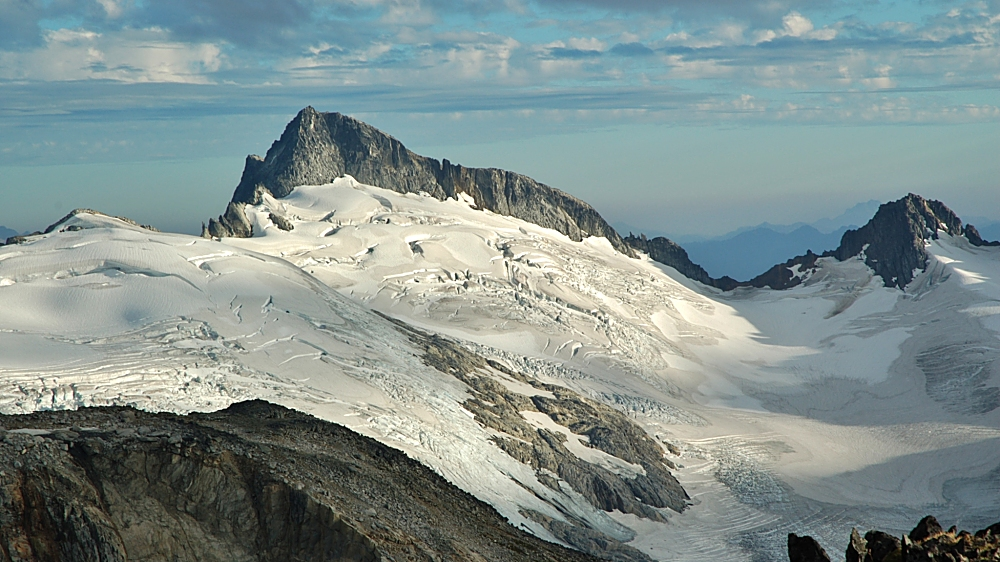
- The Sphinx

Highest point
- Elevation: 2,402 m (7,881 ft)
- Prominence: 212 m (696 ft)
- Coordinates: 49°54′07.0″N 122°57′05.0″W

Geography
- Location within British Columbia
- Location: Garibaldi Lake, British Columbia, Canada
- District: New Westminster Land District
- Parent range: Garibaldi Ranges
- Topo map: NTS 92G15 Mamquam Mountain

Climbing
- First ascent: 1911

The Sphinx is a mountain in the southernmost Coast Mountains of British Columbia, Canada. It is southeast of Garibaldi Lake.

== Climate ==
Based on the Köppen climate classification, The Sphinx is located in a marine west coast climate zone of western North America. Most weather fronts originate in the Pacific Ocean, and travel east toward the Coast Mountains where they are forced upward by the range (Orographic lift), causing them to drop their moisture in the form of rain or snowfall. As a result, the Coast Mountains experience high precipitation, especially during the winter months in the form of snowfall. Temperatures can drop below −20 °C with wind chill factors below −30 °C.
