= Panorama Ridge =

Mountain ridge in British Columbia, Canada

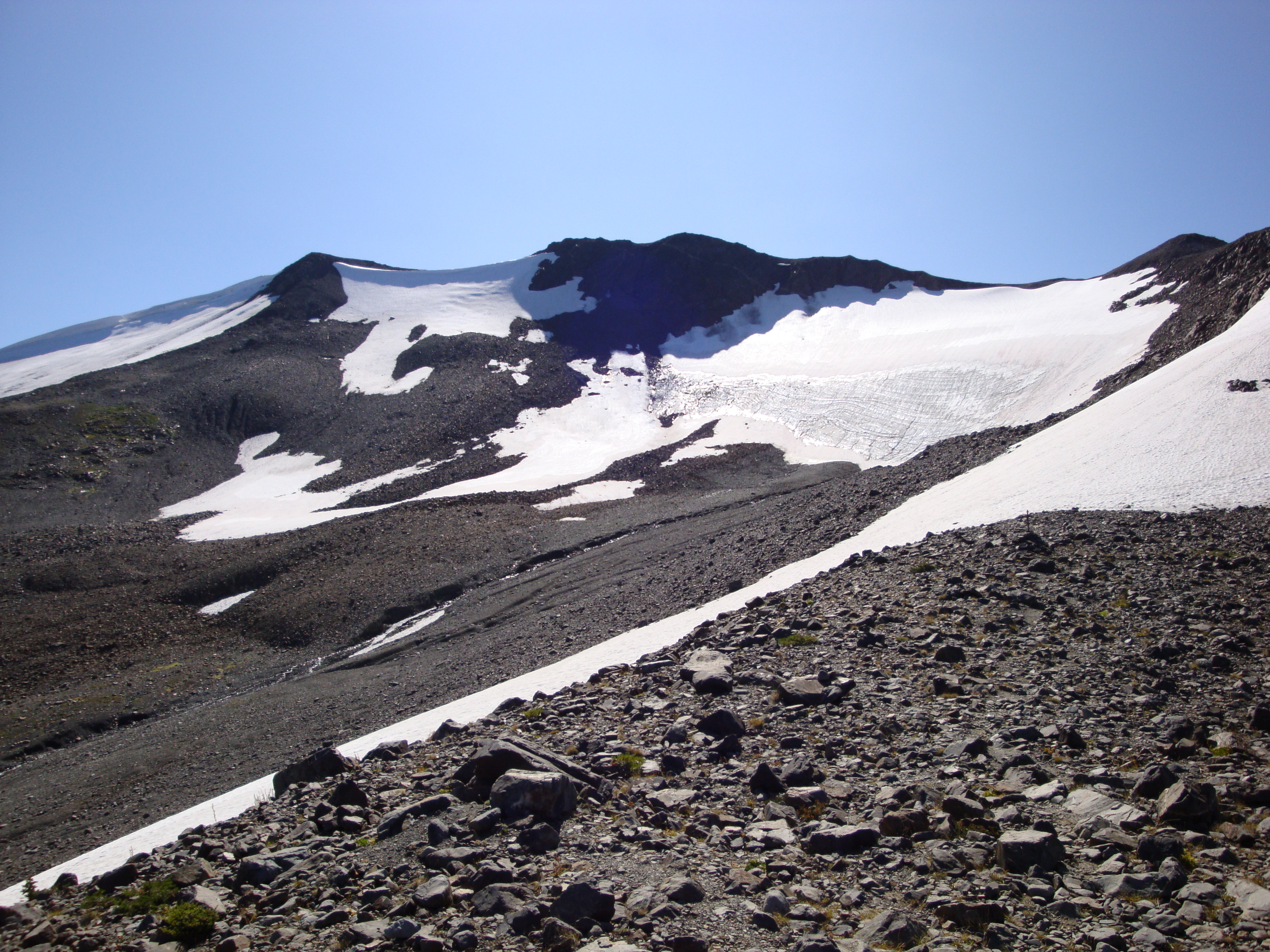
- North aspect of Panorama Ridge's high point

Highest point
- Elevation: 2,133 m (6,998 ft)
- Coordinates: 49°57′14″N 123°00′50″W

Geography
- Location within British Columbia Location within Canada
- Interactive map of Panorama Ridge
- Country: Canada
- Province: British Columbia
- District: New Westminster Land District
- Protected area: Garibaldi Provincial Park
- Parent range: Garibaldi Ranges
- Topo map: NTS 92G14 Cheakamus River

Panorama Ridge is a mountain ridge in the Garibaldi Ranges of the Pacific Ranges in southwestern British Columbia, Canada. It is located on the north side of Garibaldi Lake in Garibaldi Provincial Park.

Panorama Ridge was named around 1912 by William J. Gray, a Canadian geologist from Vancouver who took most of his panoramic photos on the ridge.

== Climate ==
Based on the Köppen climate classification, Panorama Ridge is located in the marine west coast climate zone of western North America. Most weather fronts originate in the Pacific Ocean, and travel east toward the Coast Mountains where they are forced upward by the range (Orographic lift), causing them to drop their moisture in the form of rain or snowfall. As a result, the Coast Mountains experience high precipitation, especially during the winter months in the form of snowfall. Winter temperatures can drop below −20 °C with wind chill factors below −30 °C.

== See also ==
- Gentian Peak
- Geography of British Columbia
