= Garibaldi Lake =

Lake in British Columbia, Canada

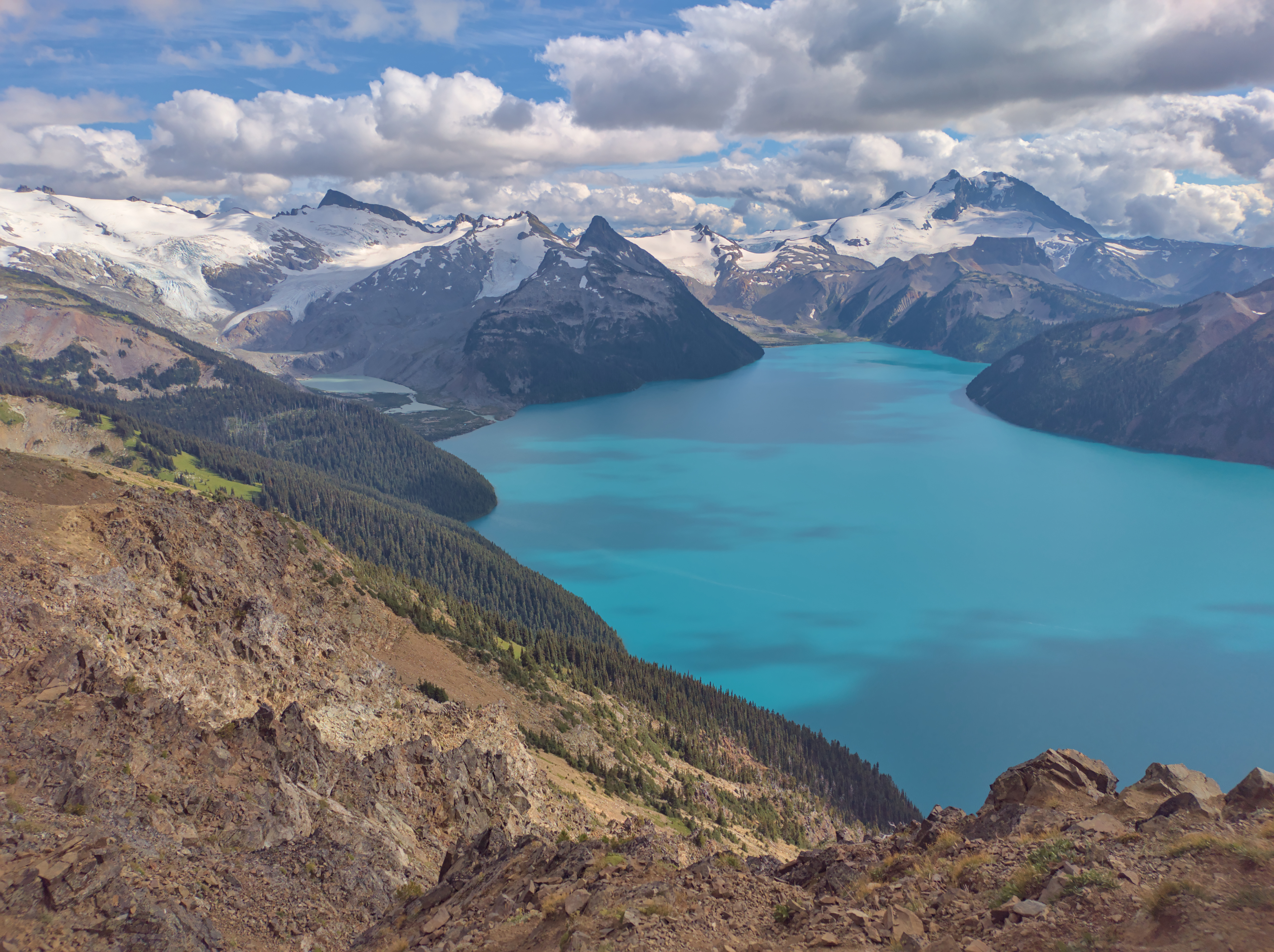
- Sphinx Glacier, Garibaldi Lake and the north face of Mount Garibaldi, looking south from Panorama Ridge at 6,900 ft (2,100 m).

- Location within British Columbia
- Location: British Columbia
- Coordinates: 49°55′30″N 123°0′36″W
- Type: Volcanogenic
- Primary inflows: Mimulus Creek, Sentinel Glacier, Sphinx Glacier
- Primary outflows: Rubble Creek
- Basin countries: Canada
- Surface area: 9.94 km^{2} (2,460 acres)
- Average depth: 119 m (390 ft)
- Max. depth: 258.7 m (849 ft)
- Water volume: 1.18 km^{3} (0.28 cu mi)
- Surface elevation: 1,484 m (4,869 ft)
- Islands: Battleship Islands
- Settlements: No

Garibaldi Lake is a turquoise-coloured alpine lake in British Columbia, Canada, located 37 km (23 mi) north of Squamish and 19 km (12 mi) south of Whistler. The lake lies within Garibaldi Provincial Park, which features mountains, glaciers, trails, forests, flowers, meadows, waterfalls. The park is a wildlife protected area.

== Geology ==
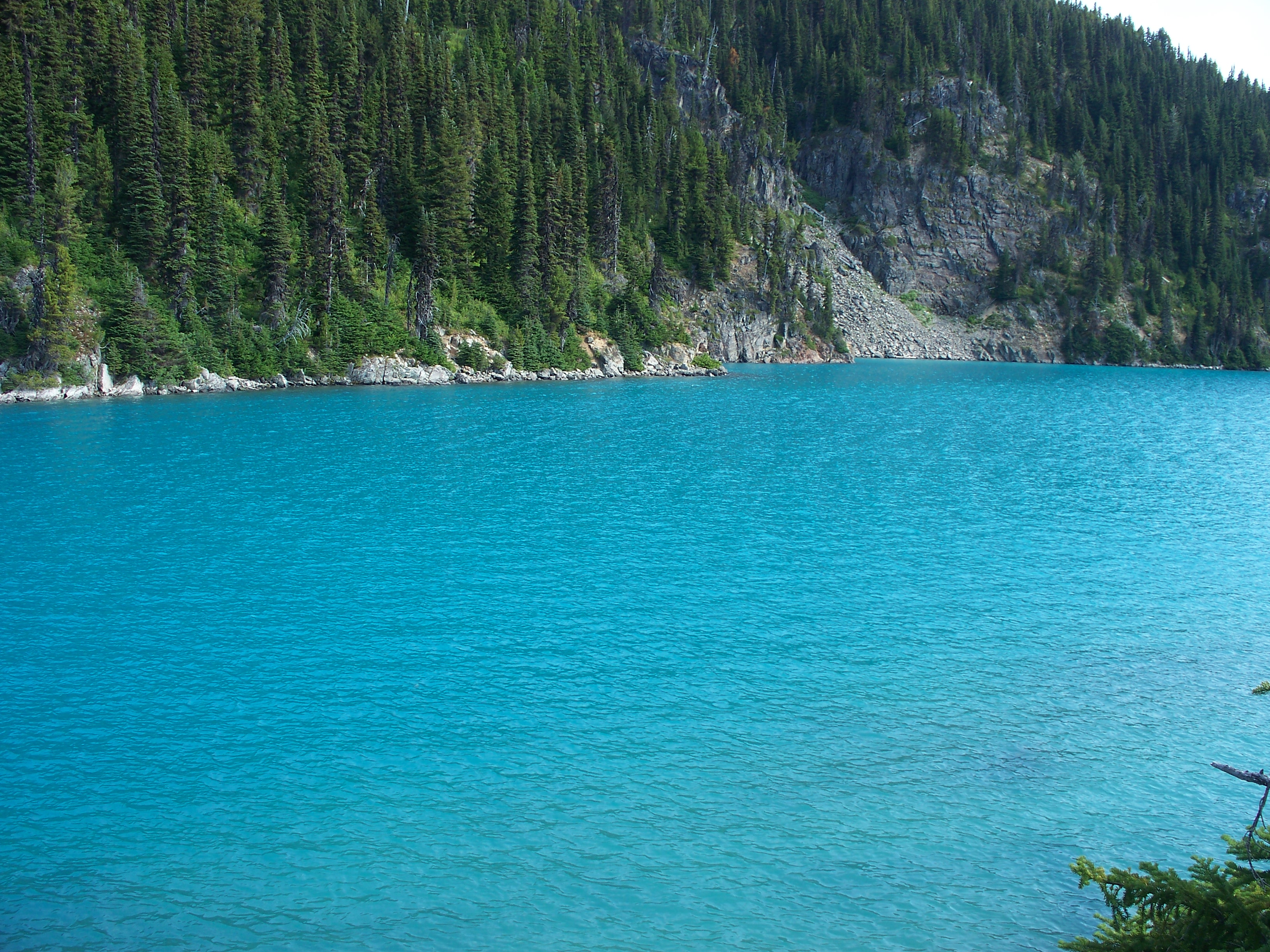
Part of Garibaldi Lake near the Rubble Creek outflow.

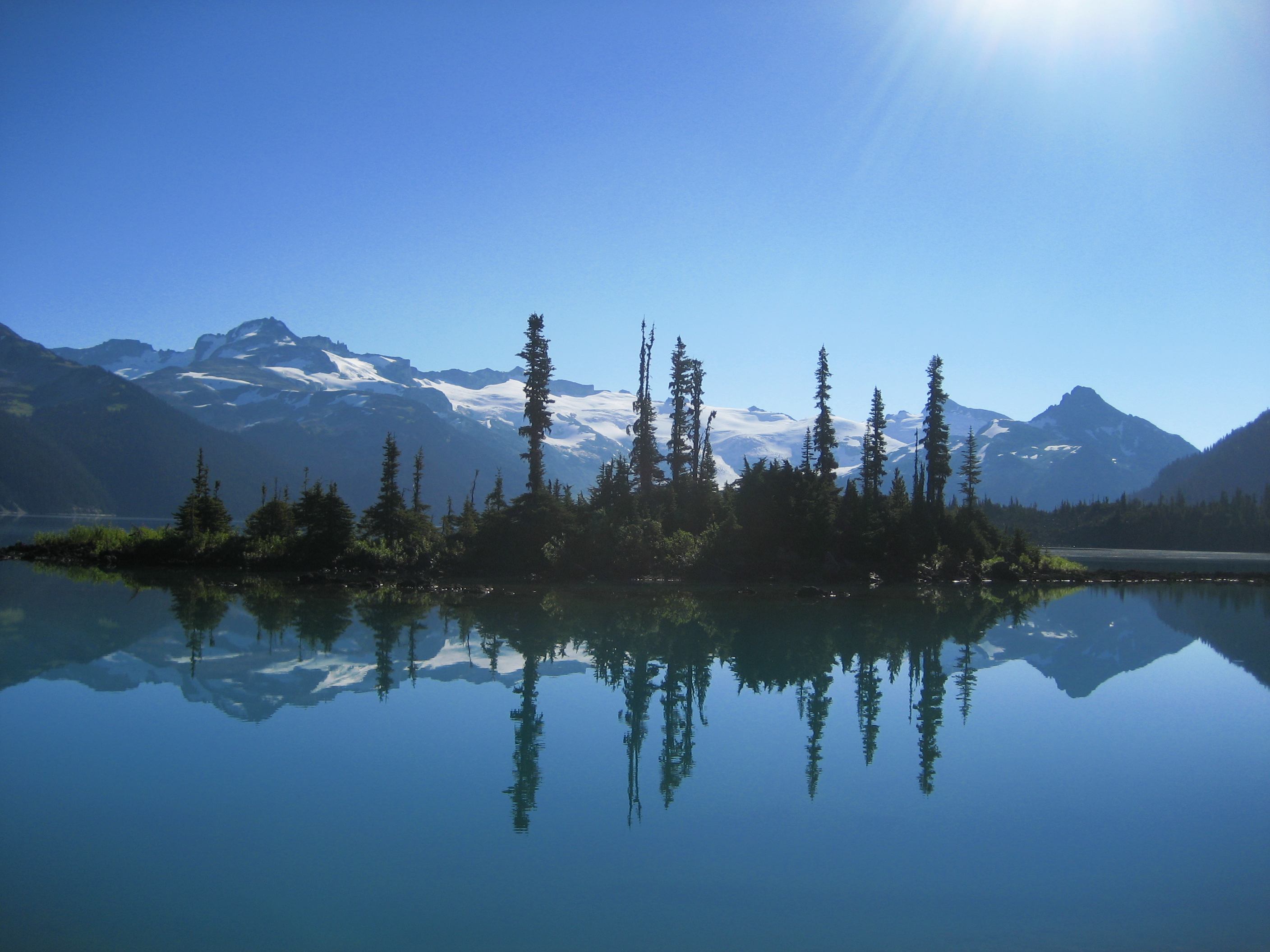
Garibaldi Lake and Battleship Islands

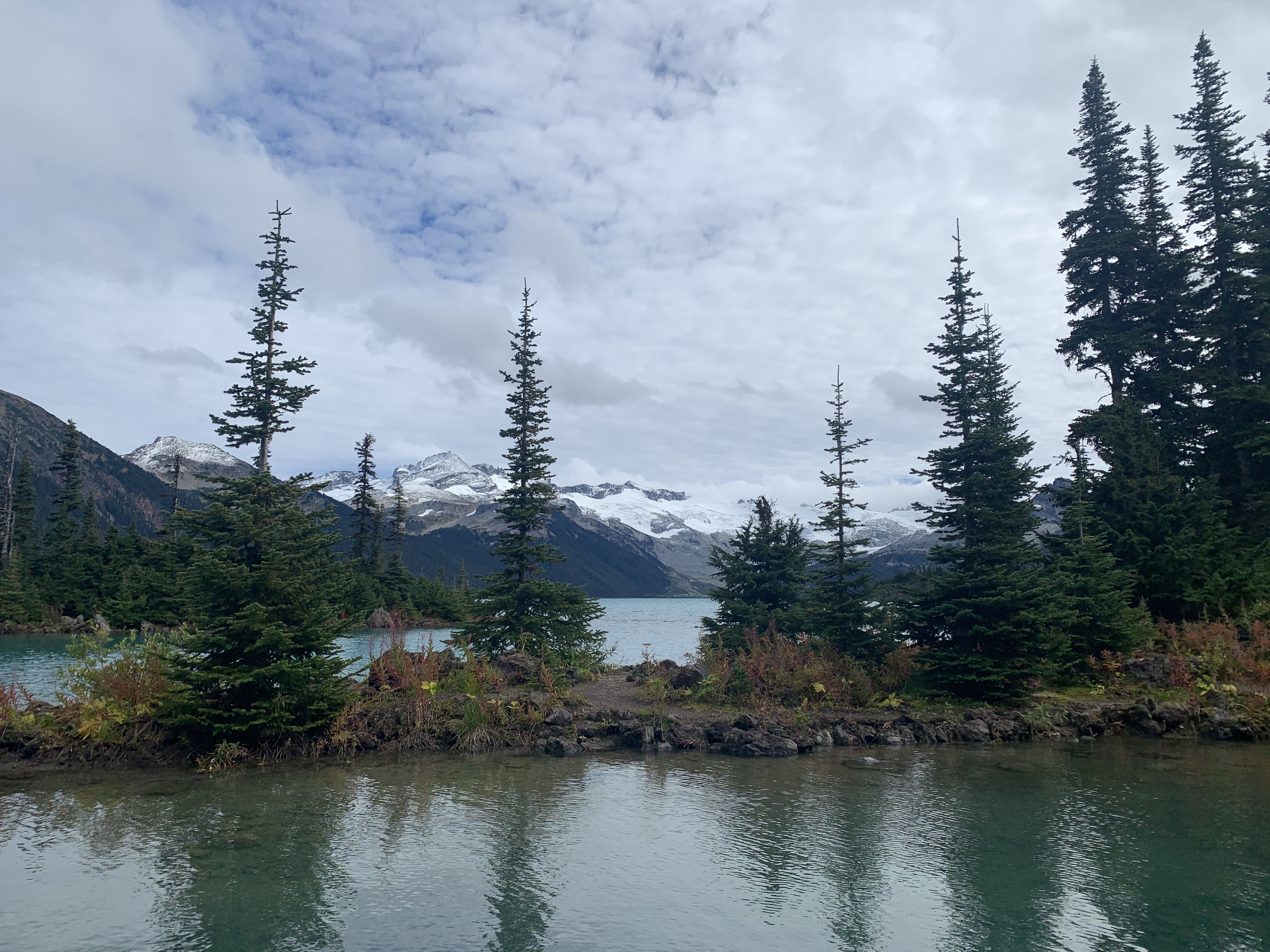
Garibaldi Lake views

Garibaldi Lake lies in a deep subalpine basin, with its surface at nearly 1,500 m (4,900 ft) above sea level and a depth exceeding 250 m (820 ft). It is almost entirely surrounded by mountains except at its northwestern tip, with volcanoes along the north, west, and south sides and non-volcanic peaks along the northeast and eastern shores. Lava flows from the volcanoes of Mount Price and Clinker Peak to the south blocked the ancestral valley, damming the waters of the lake behind the lava formation known as The Barrier. This lava dam is over 300 m (980 ft) in thickness and about 2 km (1.2 mi) wide where it impounds the lake. A series of lava outcrops along the northwestern shore of the lake form the numerous tiny Battleship Islands, several of which have been connected to the shore by simple man-made stone causeways.

The turquoise colour of the lake's water is due to glacial flour suspended in the meltwater from its two primary inflows, the large Sphinx Glacier to the east and the Sentinel Glacier to the south on the flanks of Mount Garibaldi. Throughout most of the year, outflow from Garibaldi Lake occurs only via seepage through cracks in the lava dam, with Rubble Creek appearing from springs at the base of The Barrier. During spring snowmelt, outflow is sufficient for surface drainage to occur via a shallow channel across the lava flow, into Lesser Garibaldi Lake and Barrier Lake about 1.6 km (0.99 mi) west of the main lake's shore.

== Geohazards ==
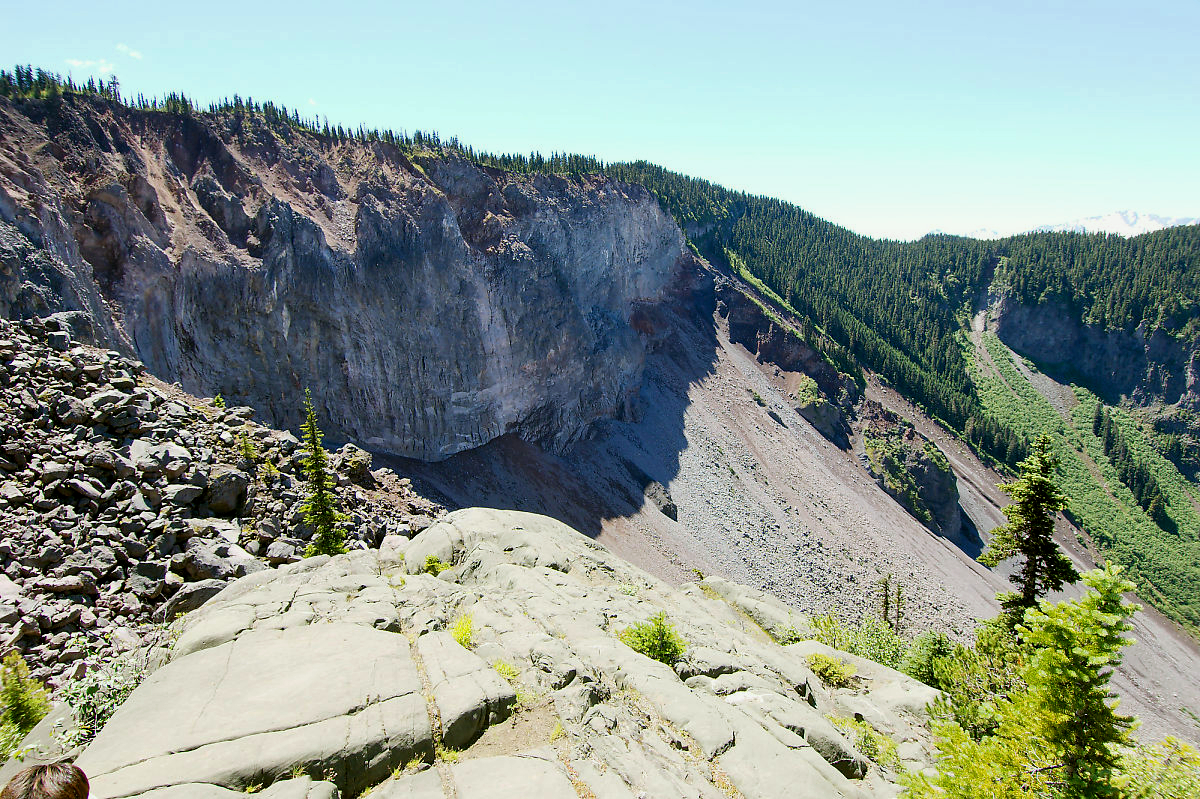
The Rock fall area and the edge of The Barrier

The unstable lava formation of The Barrier has in the past unleashed several debris flows in the area below the lake, most recently in 1855-56 forming a large boulder field which gives Rubble Creek its name. Concerns about the Barrier's instability due to volcanic, tectonic, or heavy rainfall activity prompted the provincial government to declare the area immediately below it unsafe for human habitation in 1981. This led to the evacuation of the nearby village of Garibaldi, British Columbia, and the relocation of residents to new recreational subdivisions away from the hazard zone. Collapse of the barrier has been speculated upon, and there have been suggestions of potential catastrophic downstream consequences, however, the "District of Squamish, Integrated Flood Hazard Management Plan Background Report" (PDF). concludes that there has never been any suggestion in any scientific evidence that the Barrier will eventually collapse to the point of creating an uncontrolled release of Garibaldi Lake or cause extreme flooding in downstream neighbourhoods along the Squamish River. However, the "District of Squamish Integrated Flood Hazard Management Plan - Final Report" (PDF). notes that a large collapse of the Barrier could potentially block the Cheakamus River increasing the possibility of a debris flood that could affect the Paradise Valley.

== Recreation ==
All recreational activities in the area are governed by the regulations of Garibaldi Provincial Park. Primary access to the lake is via the 9 km (5.6 mi) long Garibaldi Lake Trail, which gains approximately 920 m (3,020 ft) of elevation from the Rubble Creek Trailhead. There are campgrounds and day-use shelters on the west shore of Garibaldi Lake, and also farther northwest at Taylor Meadows. Nearly all sites have tent platforms to protect the surrounding ecosystem. During the summer, access to the eastern end of the lake is severely limited, since no trails have been constructed along the steep and unstable slopes which plunge directly into the lake. During winter, the lake is typically frozen from late December to late April, allowing backcountry skiers and snowshoers to easily reach the far shore. A pair of small alpine huts are located in Sphinx Bay on the eastern shore and Sentinel Bay at the southeastern tip of the lake.

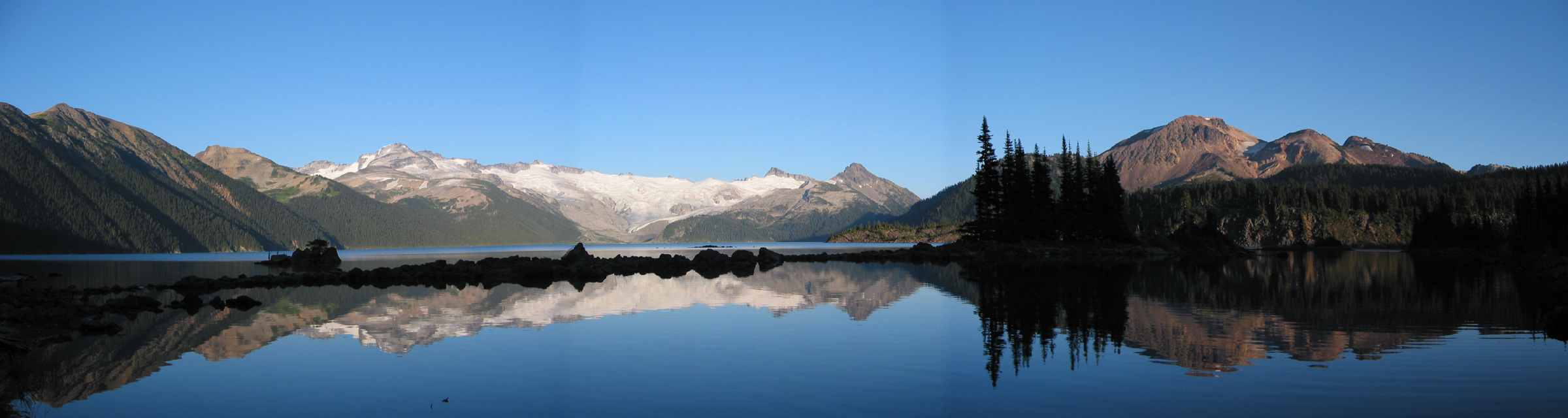
Panorama of Garibaldi Lake, with Panorama Ridge, Gentian Peak, Castle Towers Mountain, Mount Carr, the Sphinx Glacier, Guard Mountain in the distance, and the volcanoes of Mount Price and Clinker Peak at right. The Battleship Islands are in the foreground.

== See also ==
- List of lakes of British Columbia
- Cascade Volcanoes
- Garibaldi Lake volcanic field
- Garibaldi Volcanic Belt
- Garibaldi Provincial Park
