= Castle Towers Mountain =

Triple summit mountain in the country of Canada

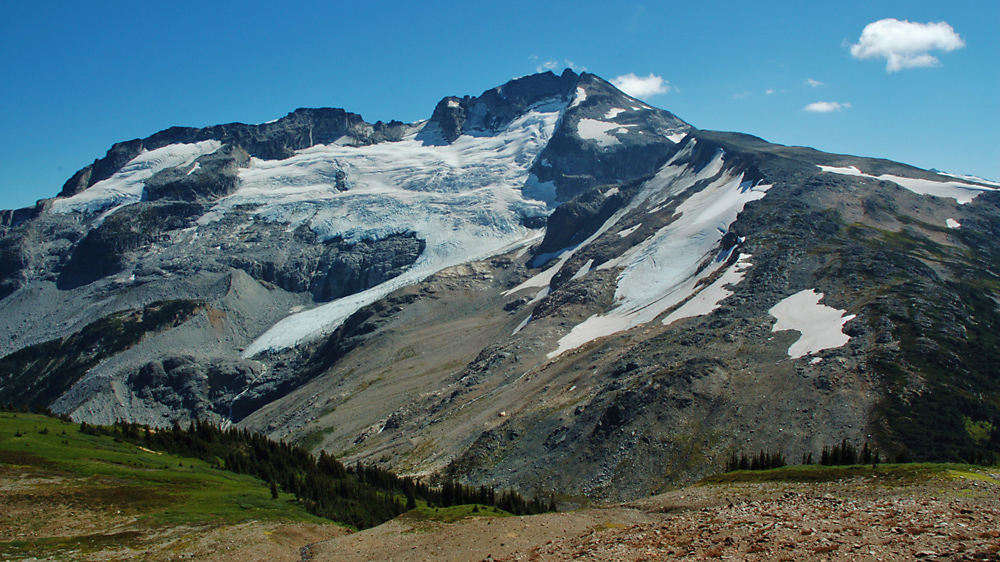
- Castle Towers Mountain seen from Gentian Ridge

Highest point
- Elevation: 2,676 m (8,780 ft)
- Prominence: 1,103 m (3,619 ft)
- Coordinates: 49°56′23″N 122°56′33″W

Geography
- Location within British Columbia
- Interactive map of Castle Towers Mountain
- Location: British Columbia, Canada
- District: New Westminster Land District
- Parent range: Pacific Ranges
- Topo map: NTS 92G15 Mamquam Mountain

Climbing
- First ascent: 1911 T. Park; H. Korten

Castle Towers Mountain is a triple summit mountain on the east side of Garibaldi Lake in southwestern British Columbia, Canada. The first ascent party from the BC Mountaineering Club named the mountain after its appearance in August 1911.

== Climate ==
Based on the Köppen climate classification, the mountain is located in the marine west coast climate zone of western North America. Most weather fronts originate in the Pacific Ocean, and travel east toward the Coast Mountains where they are forced upward by the range (Orographic lift), causing them to drop their moisture in the form of rain or snowfall. As a result, the Coast Mountains experience high precipitation, especially during the winter months in the form of snowfall. Temperatures can drop below −20 °C with wind chill factors below −30 °C.

== Gallery ==
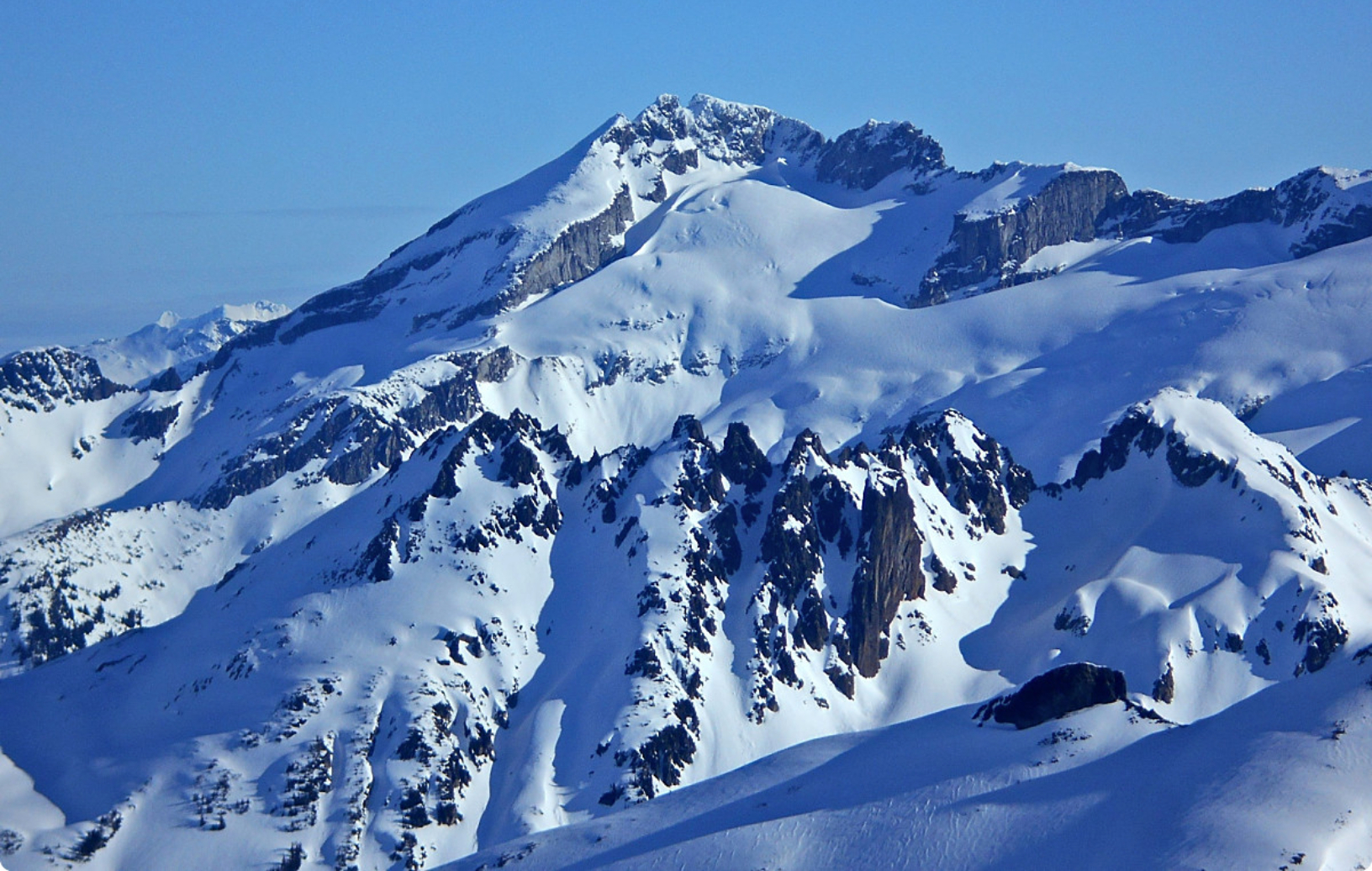
Castle Towers Mountain in winter

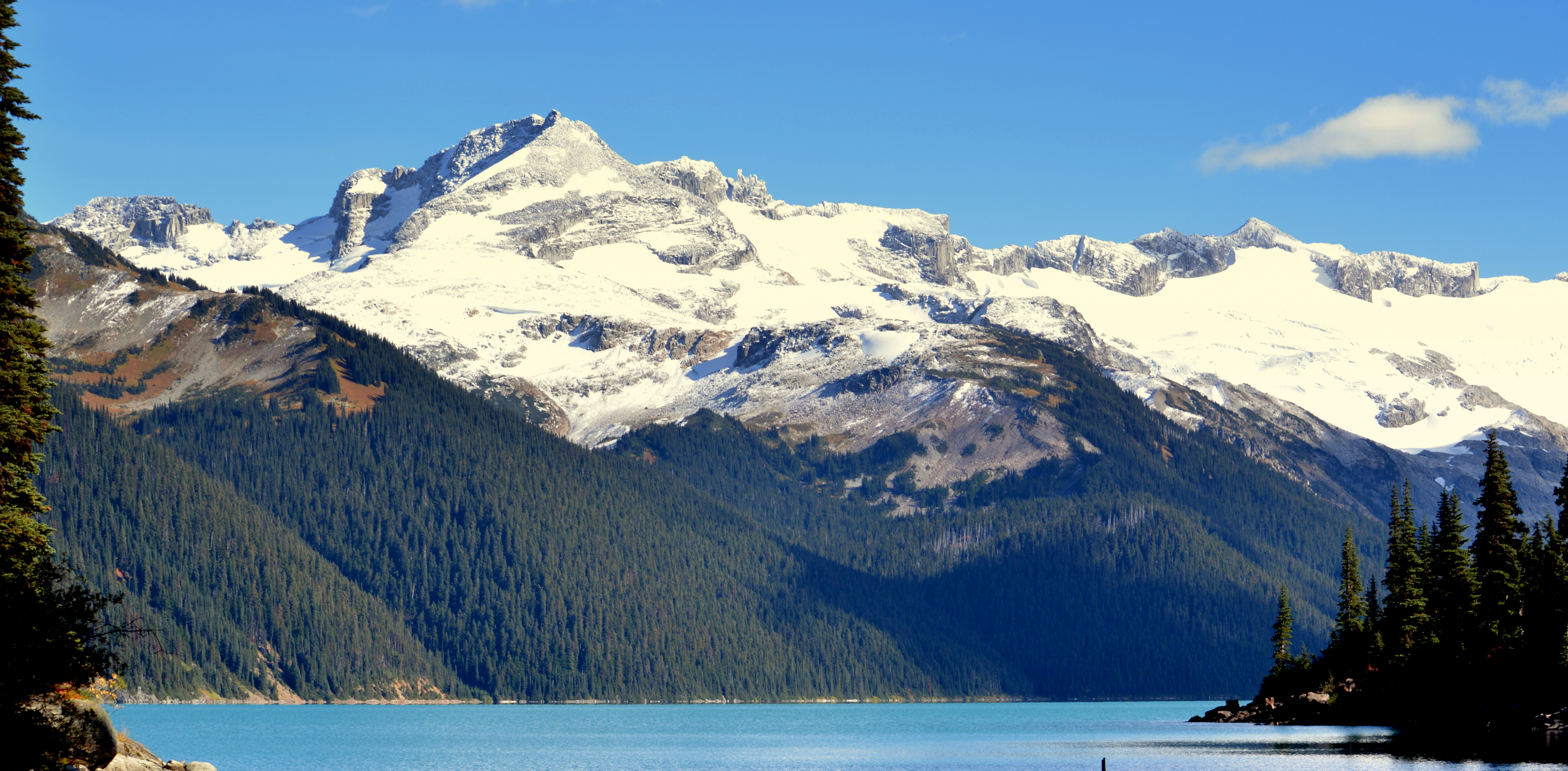
Castle Towers Mountain (left) and Mount Carr (right) viewed from Garibaldi Lake. Phyllis's Engine (top, center)

== See also ==
- Phyllis's Engine
