= Diavolo Peak =

Mountain in British Columbia, Canada

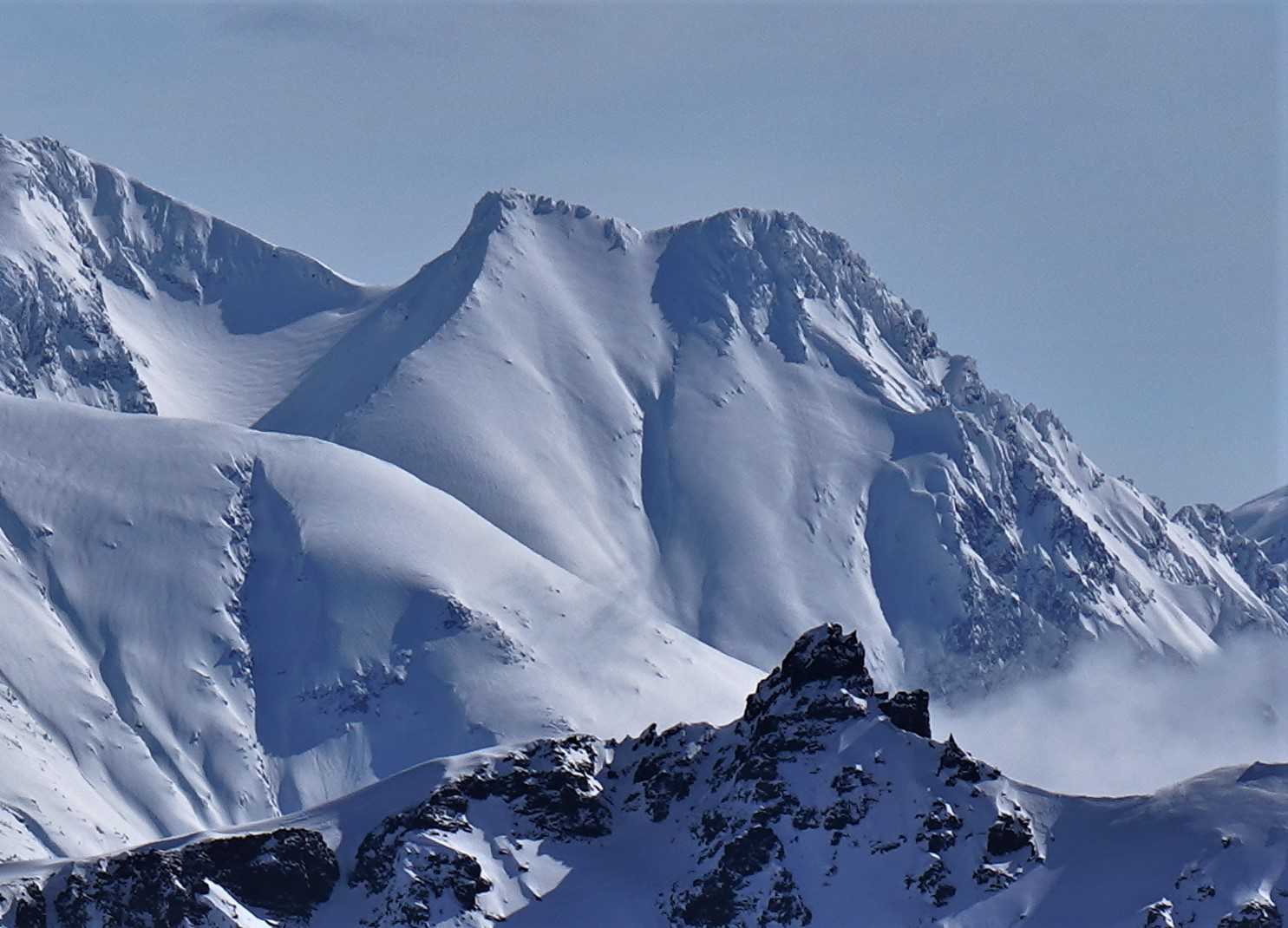
- West aspect of Diavolo/Angelo

Highest point
- Elevation: 2,569 m (8,428 ft)
- Prominence: 83 m (272 ft)
- Parent peak: Overlord Mountain (2,625 m)
- Isolation: 0.669 km (0.416 mi)
- Listing: Mountains of British Columbia
- Coordinates: 50°0′20″N 122°48′57″W

Naming
- Etymology: diavolo (devil)

Geography
- Location within British Columbia Location within Canada
- Interactive map of Diavolo Peak
- Country: Canada
- Province: British Columbia
- District: New Westminster Land District
- Protected area: Garibaldi Provincial Park
- Parent range: Fitzsimmons Range; Garibaldi Ranges; Coast Mountains
- Topo map: NTS 92J2 Whistler

Climbing
- First ascent: 1923 by Neal Carter

Diavolo Peak is a 2,569-metre (8,428-foot) mountain located in British Columbia, Canada.

== Description ==
Diavolo Peak is the fifth-highest peak of the Fitzsimmons Range which is a subrange of the Garibaldi Ranges. It is situated 16 km (10 mi) southeast of Whistler in Garibaldi Provincial Park, and the nearest higher peak is Mount Benvolio, 669 metres (2,195 ft) to the north-northeast. The Diavolo Glacier rests on the east aspect of the peak. Precipitation runoff from the peak and meltwater from the glacier drains into tributaries of the Cheakamus River. Topographic relief is significant as the summit rises 1,500 metres (4,921 ft) above the river in two kilometres (1.24 mile).

== History ==
The first ascent of the mountain was made on September 18, 1923, by Neal M. Carter and Charles T. Townsend.

Diavolo is an Italian word, meaning "devil", and the peak was so-named by Carter and Townsend because of a steep, rotten arête and black-colored rock. They named its subsidiary peak "Angelo" because it looked easy to climb and angelic by comparison. Angelo is an Italian word, meaning "angel".

The mountain's toponym was officially adopted on September 2, 1930, by the Geographical Names Board of Canada.

== Climate ==
Based on the Köppen climate classification, Diavolo Peak is located in the marine west coast climate zone of western North America. Most weather fronts originate in the Pacific Ocean, and travel east toward the Coast Mountains where they are forced upward by the range (Orographic lift), causing them to drop their moisture in the form of rain or snowfall. As a result, the Coast Mountains experience high precipitation, especially during the winter months in the form of snowfall. Temperatures can drop below −20 °C with wind chill factors below −30 °C. The months July through September offer the most favorable weather for climbing Diavolo Peak.

== Angelo Peak ==
Angelo Peak is a subsidiary peak 185 meters south of Diavolo Peak. At 2,561-meters-elevation, it is the sixth-highest peak of the Fitzsimmons Range, but it has only 23 metres of prominence. Angelo was first climbed by a British Columbia Mountaineering Club party on August 15, 1924. The mountain's toponym was officially adopted on September 2, 1930, by the Geographical Names Board of Canada.

== Gallery ==
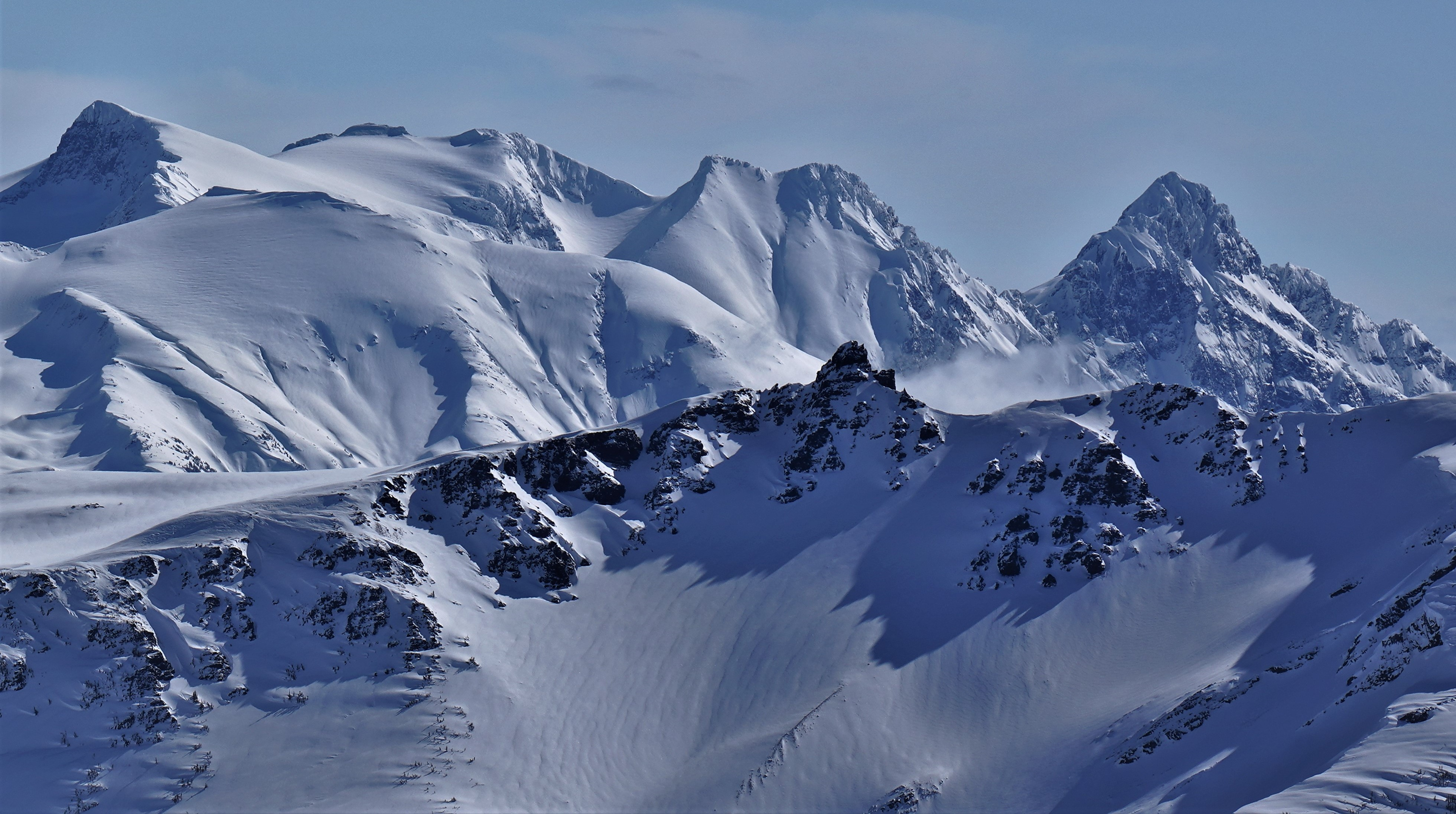
Overlord Mountain (upper left), Diavolo Peak (center, top), Cheakamus Mountain (right), Helm Horn (foreground)

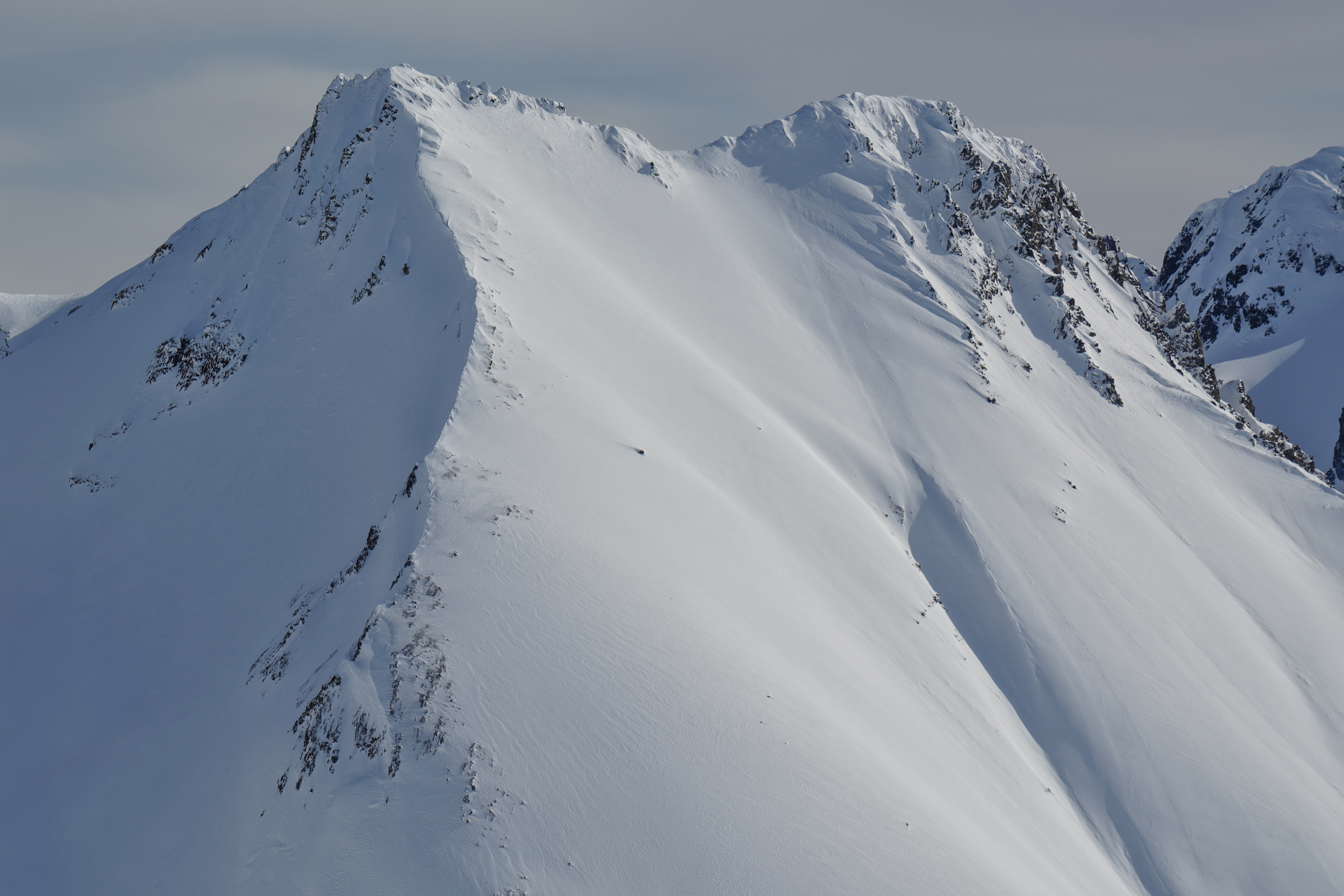
West aspect of Diavolo Peak (left) and Angelo Peak (right)

== See also ==
- Geography of British Columbia
