= Whirlwind Peak =

Mountain in British Columbia, Canada

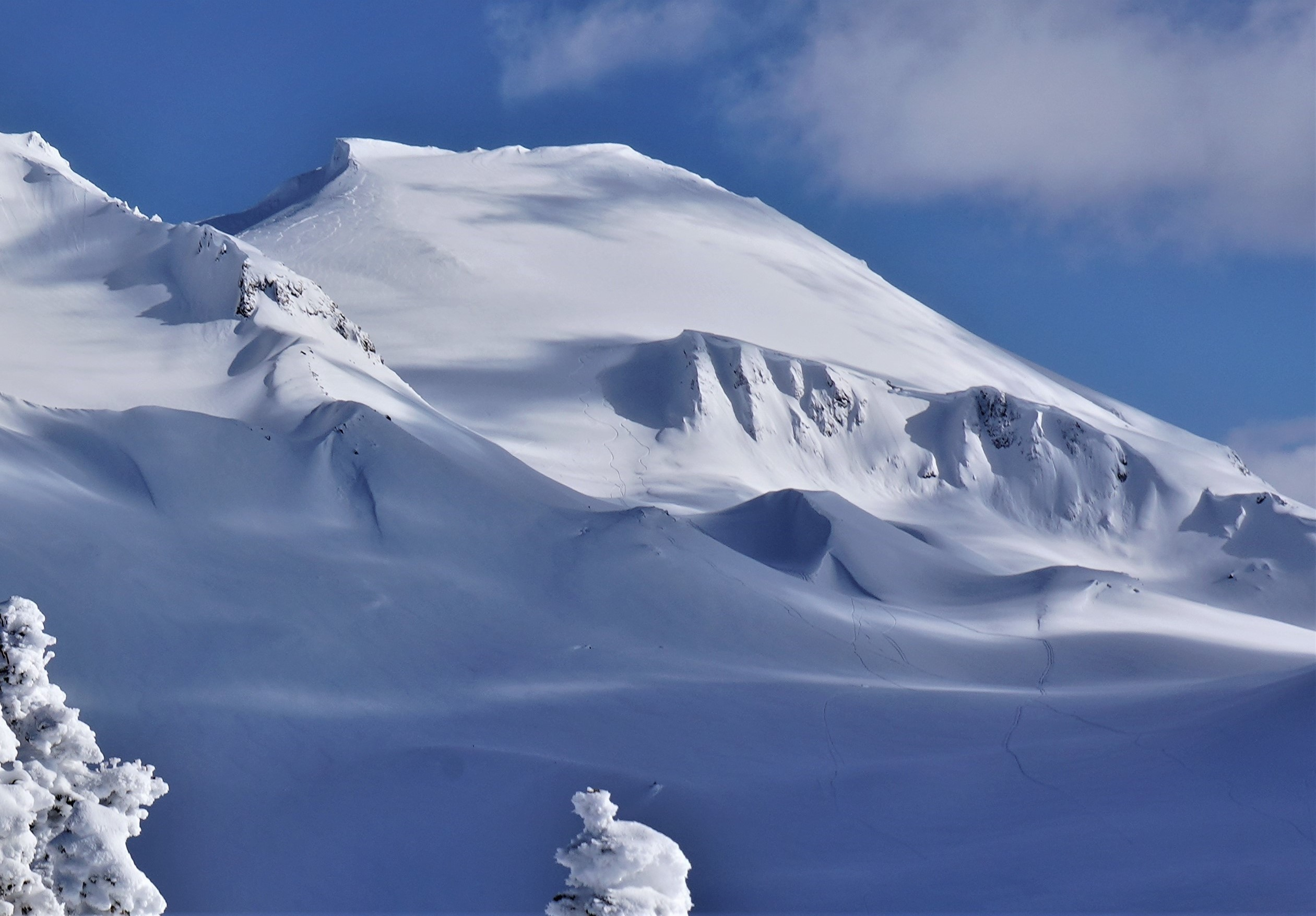
- Northwest aspect in winter

Highest point
- Elevation: 2,427 m (7,963 ft)
- Prominence: 97 m (318 ft)
- Parent peak: Overlord Mountain (2,625 m)
- Isolation: 0.86 km (0.53 mi)
- Listing: Mountains of British Columbia
- Coordinates: 50°0′32″N 122°50′30″W

Naming
- Etymology: Whirlwind

Geography
- Location within British Columbia Location within Canada
- Interactive map of Whirlwind Peak
- Country: Canada
- Province: British Columbia
- District: New Westminster Land District
- Protected area: Garibaldi Provincial Park
- Parent range: Fitzsimmons Range; Garibaldi Ranges; Coast Ranges
- Topo map: NTS 92J2 Whistler

Climbing
- First ascent: 1923 Neal Carter, Charles Townsend
- Easiest route: class 2

Whirlwind Peak is a 2,427-metre (7,963-foot) mountain summit in southwestern British Columbia, Canada.

== Description ==
Whirlwind Peak is located in Garibaldi Provincial Park, in the Garibaldi Ranges of the Coast Mountains. It is the eighth-highest point of the Fitzsimmons Range, which is a subset of the Garibaldi Ranges. It is situated 14 km (9 mi) southeast of Whistler, 1.31 km south-southeast of Fissile Peak, 1.76 km southwest of Overlord Mountain, and the nearest higher neighbor is Refuse Pinnacle, 0.94 km to the east-northeast. Precipitation runoff from the peak drains into tributaries of the Cheakamus River. Whirlwind is more notable for its steep rise above local terrain than for its absolute elevation as topographic relief is significant with the summit rising 1,525 meters (5,003 ft) above the river in 2.5 km (1.6 mi).

== History ==
The peak was so named by the Garibaldi Park Board because of evidence that a destructive windstorm had levelled an area of trees on the peak's slopes. The mountain's toponym was officially adopted on September 2, 1930, by the Geographical Names Board of Canada. The first ascent of the summit was made in 1923 by Neal Carter and Charles Townsend.

== Climate ==
Based on the Köppen climate classification, Whirlwind Peak is located in the marine west coast climate zone of western North America. Most weather fronts originate in the Pacific Ocean, and travel east toward the Coast Mountains where they are forced upward by the range (orographic lift), causing them to drop their moisture in the form of rain or snowfall. As a result, the Coast Mountains experience high precipitation, especially during the winter months in the form of snowfall. Winter temperatures can drop below −20 °C with wind chill factors below −30 °C. This climate supports the Overlord Glacier on the north slope of the peak. The months July through September offer the most favorable weather for climbing Whirlwind Peak.

== See also ==
- Geography of British Columbia
