= Fissile Peak =

Mountain in British Columbia, Canada

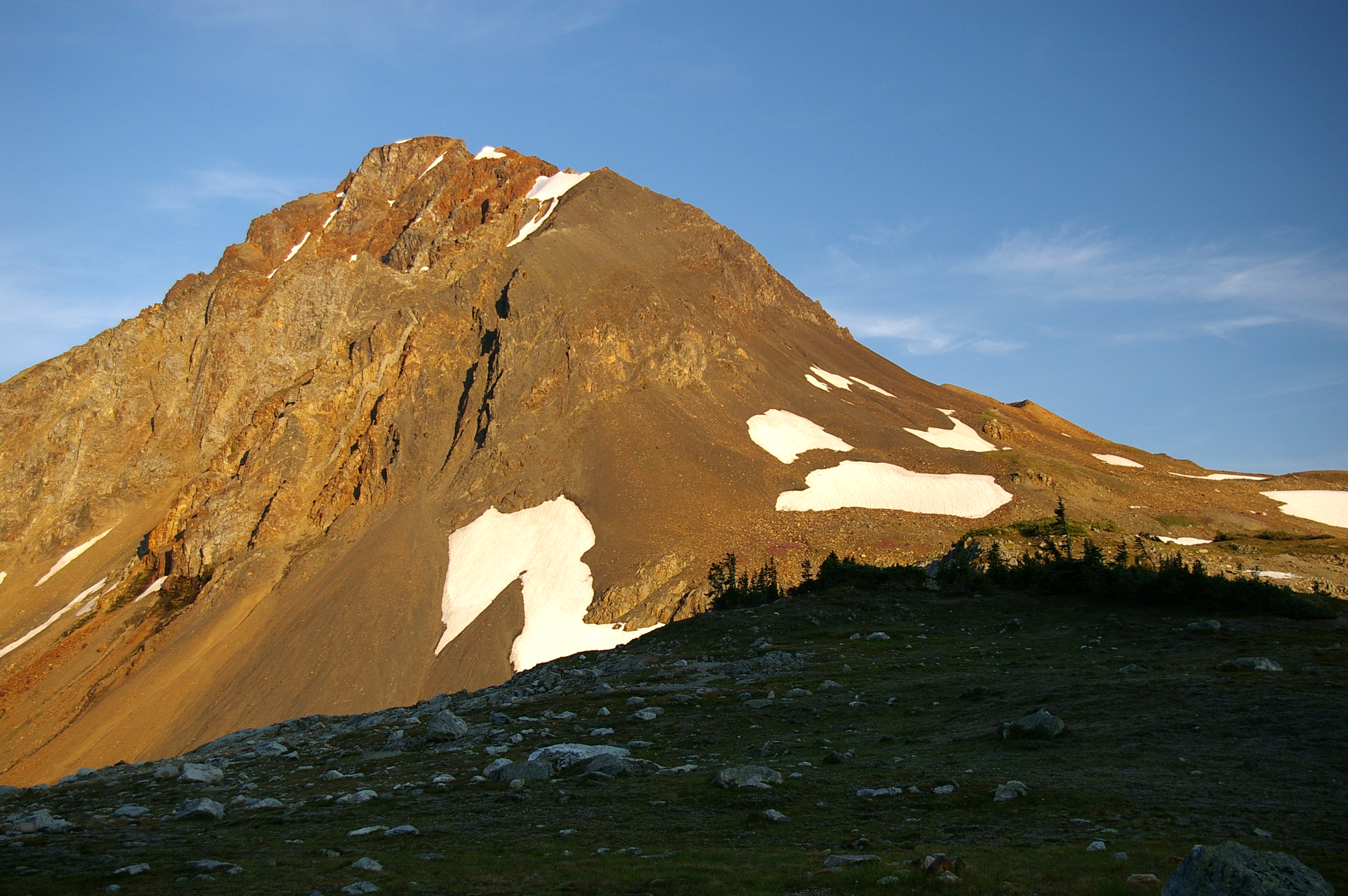
- Fissile Peak viewed from Russet Lake, August 2006

Highest point
- Elevation: 2,439 m (8,002 ft)
- Prominence: 119 m (390 ft)
- Parent peak: Refuse Pinnacle (2485 m)
- Listing: Mountains of British Columbia
- Coordinates: 50°01′07″N 122°50′55″W

Geography
- Location within British Columbia Location within Canada
- Interactive map of Fissile Peak
- Location: British Columbia, Canada
- Parent range: Fitzsimmons Range
- Topo map: NTS 92J2 Whistler

Fissile Peak, formerly known as Red Mountain, is a mountain peak located on the eastern side of Cheakamus Lake southeast of Whistler in Garibaldi Provincial Park of British Columbia, Canada. The mountain is composed of red slate which is easily divided into thin sheets of uniform thickness; in geological terms this feature is known as fissility.

== Climate ==
Based on the Köppen climate classification, Fissile Peak is located in the marine west coast climate zone of western North America. Most weather fronts originate in the Pacific Ocean, and travel east toward the Coast Mountains where they are forced upward by the range (Orographic lift), causing them to drop their moisture in the form of rain or snowfall. As a result, the Coast Mountains experience high precipitation, especially during the winter months in the form of snowfall. Winter temperatures can drop below −20 °C with wind chill factors below −30 °C. The months July through September offer the most favorable weather for climbing Fissile Peak.

== Gallery ==
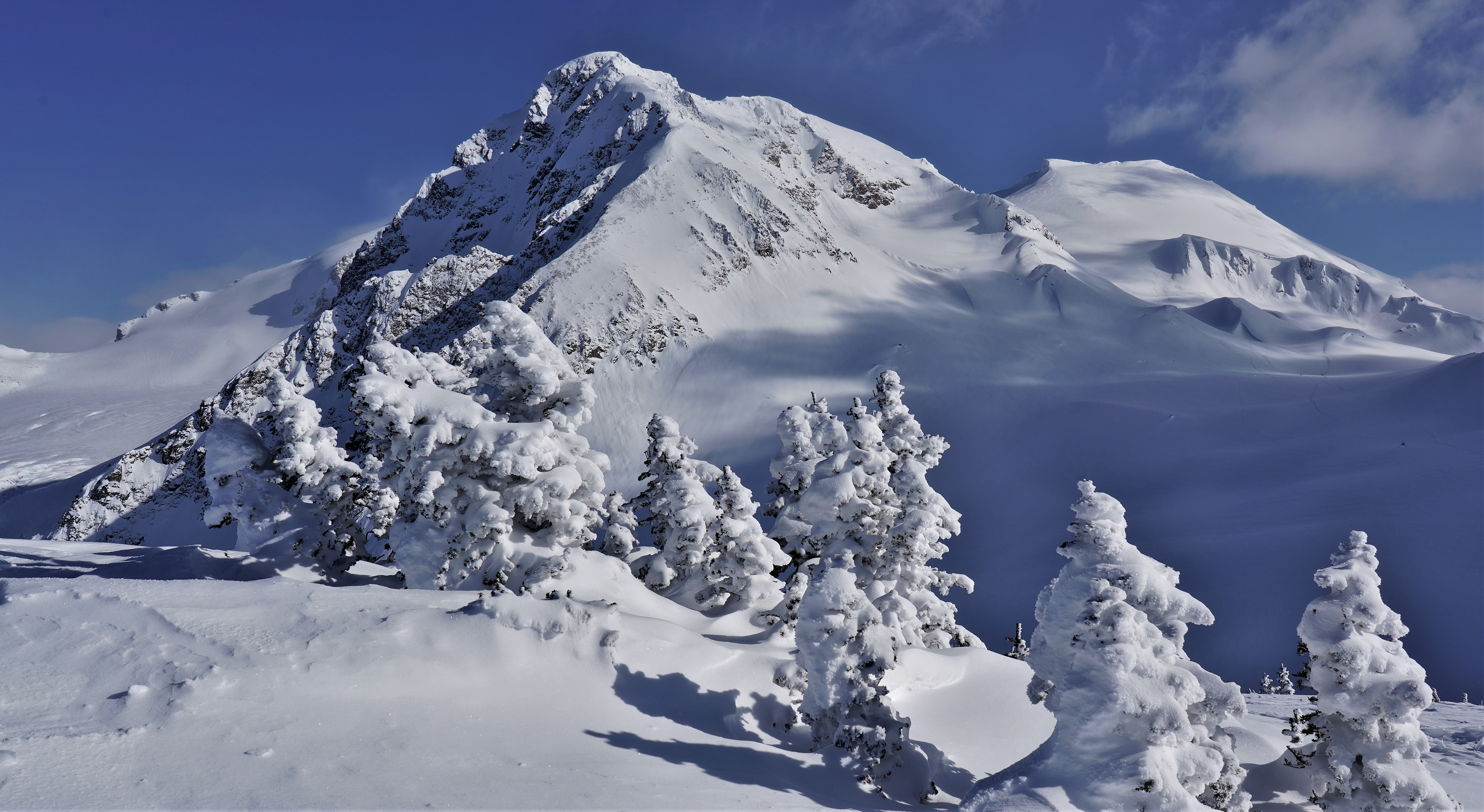
Northwest aspect of Fissile Peak and Whirlwind Peak (behind, right) in winter.

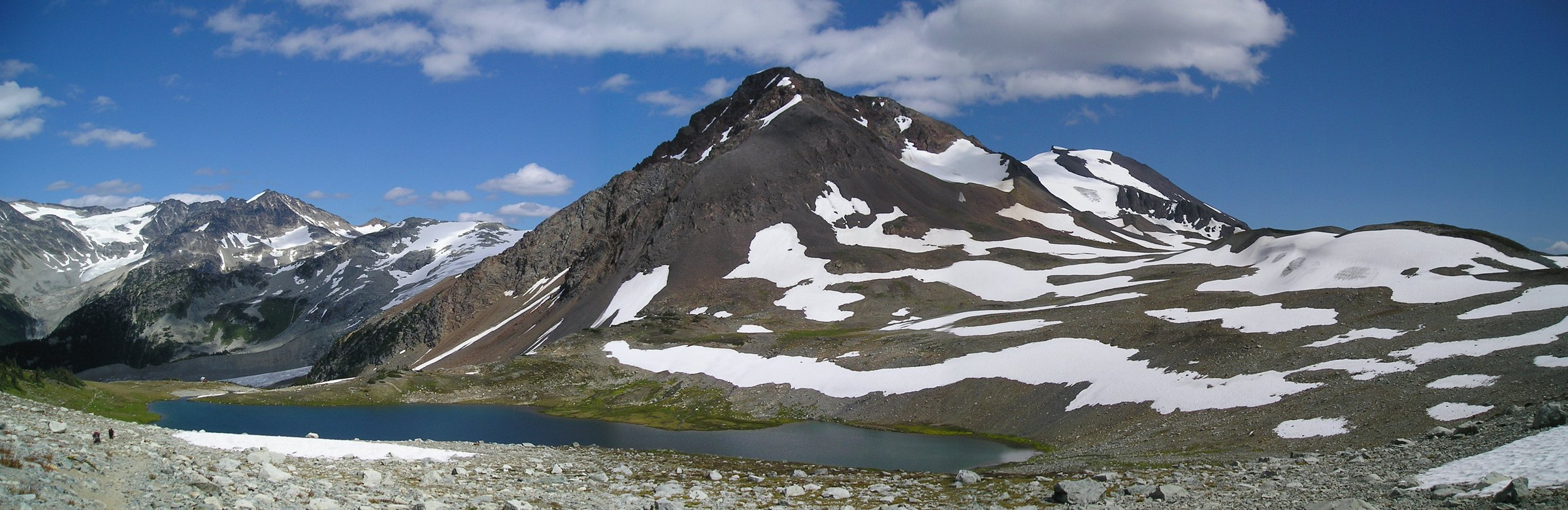
Russet Lake, Fissile Peak

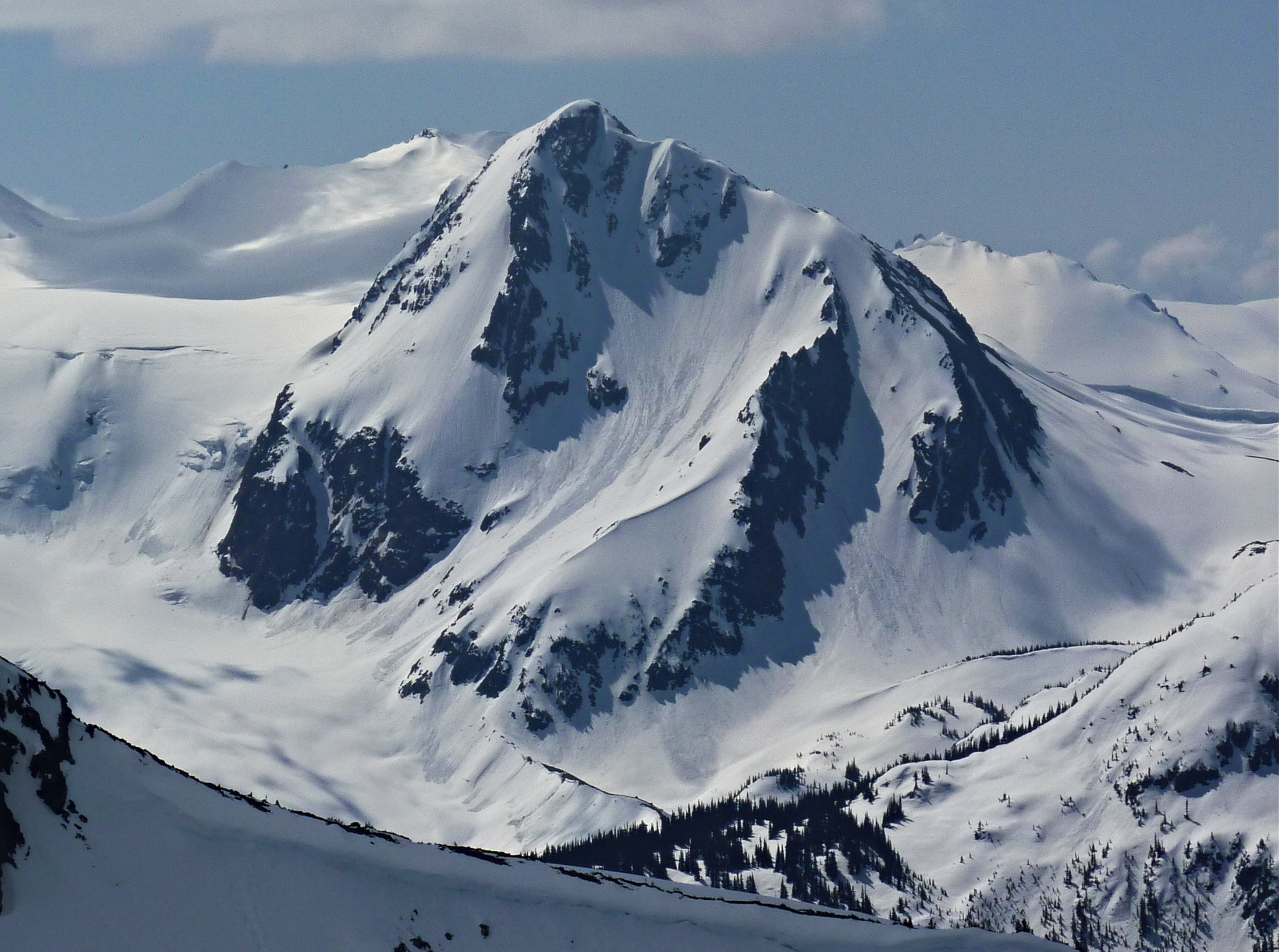
Fissile Peak in spring

== See also ==
- Geography of British Columbia
- Geology of British Columbia
- Mount Price
- Overlord Mountain
