= Cheakamus Mountain =

Mountain in British Columbia, Canada

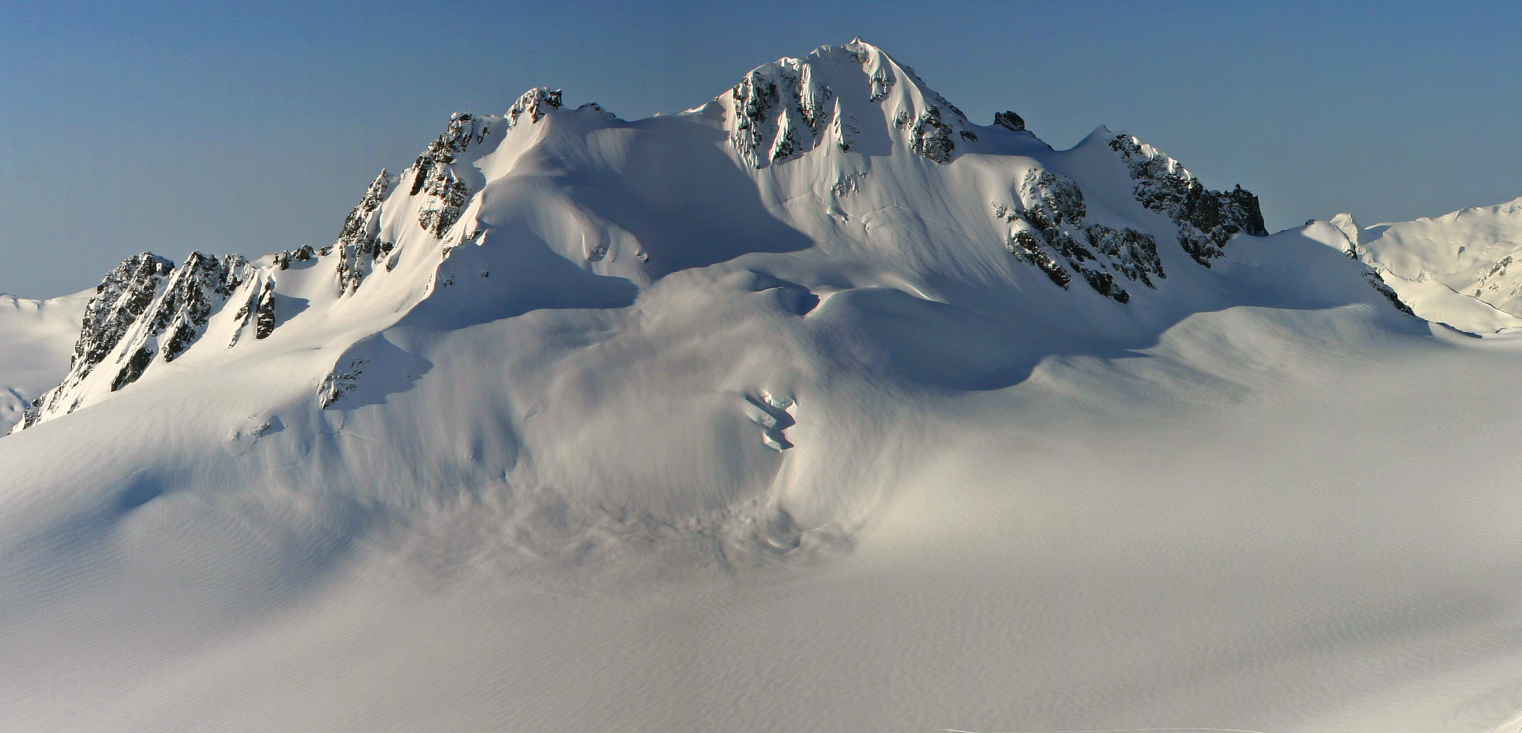
- Cheakamus Mountain, north aspect

Highest point
- Elevation: 2,588 m (8,491 ft)
- Prominence: 298 m (978 ft)
- Parent peak: Mount Benvolio (2613 m)
- Listing: Mountains of British Columbia
- Coordinates: 50°00′00″N 122°48′07″W

Geography
- Location within British Columbia Location within Canada
- Interactive map of Cheakamus Mountain
- Location: Garibaldi Provincial Park; British Columbia, Canada
- District: New Westminster Land District
- Parent range: Fitzsimmons Range; Garibaldi Ranges; Coast Ranges
- Topo map: NTS 92G15 Mamquam Mountain

Climbing
- First ascent: 1950
- Easiest route: class 3 North Face/West Ridge

Cheakamus Mountain is a 2,588-metre (8,491-foot) glacier-clad peak located in the Garibaldi Ranges of the Coast Mountains, in Garibaldi Provincial Park of southwestern British Columbia, Canada. It is the fourth-highest peak of the Fitzsimmons Range, which is a subset of the Garibaldi Ranges. It is situated 16 km (10 mi) southeast of Whistler, and its nearest higher peak is Mount Benvolio, 1.65 km (1 mi) to the northwest. The Diavolo Glacier spreads out below the north aspect of the peak, and precipitation runoff from the peak with meltwater from the glacier drains into tributaries of the Cheakamus River. The peak was named in association with the river, which in turn is anglicized from Tseearkamisht, a Squamish word meaning "people who use the cedar rope fishing net". The mountain's name was officially adopted on September 2, 1930, by the Geographical Names Board of Canada. The first ascent of the mountain was made in 1950 by Roy Hooley, Jimmy Kilborn, and Ian Kirk.

== Climate ==
Based on the Köppen climate classification, Cheakamus Mountain is located in the marine west coast climate zone of western North America. Most weather fronts originate in the Pacific Ocean, and travel east toward the Coast Mountains where they are forced upward by the range (Orographic lift), causing them to drop their moisture in the form of rain or snowfall. As a result, the Coast Mountains experience high precipitation, especially during the winter months in the form of snowfall. Temperatures can drop below −20 °C with wind chill factors below −30 °C. The months July through September offer the most favorable weather for climbing Cheakamus Mountain.

== See also ==
- Geography of British Columbia
- Geology of British Columbia
