= Piccolo Summit =

Mountain in British Columbia, Canada

- Location within British Columbia

Highest point
- Elevation: 2,043 m (6,703 ft)
- Prominence: 73 m (240 ft)
- Coordinates: 50°02′48″N 122°56′27″W

Geography
- Location: British Columbia, Canada
- District: New Westminster Land District
- Parent range: Fitzsimmons Range
- Topo map: NTS 92J2 Whistler

Geology
- Rock age: Late Cretaceous
- Mountain type: Volcanic

Piccolo Summit is a summit in the Fitzsimmons Range of the Garibaldi Ranges of the Pacific Ranges in southwestern British Columbia, Canada. It is located on the north side of Cheakamus Lake just southeast of the town of Whistler in Garibaldi Provincial Park. The mountain is the highest point of a group of hills called the Musical Bumps.

In 2004, volcanologist Jack Souther of the Geological Survey of Canada convinced that Piccolo Summit is composed of lava flows that erupted from a volcano about 100 million years ago during the Late Cretaceous period. Nearby Whistler Mountain is composed of lava flows and nearby Flute Summit is a subvolcanic intrusion that was formed during the same period.

== See also ==
- Gambier Group
