= Gambier Group =

The Gambier Group is an Early Cretaceous aged geologic group in the southern Coast Mountains of British Columbia, Canada. It was formed on the easternmost point of the Wrangellia Terrane as a volcanic arc about 100 million years ago along a west-to southwest-dipping subduction zone. This prehistoric volcanic arc is generally referred to as the Gambier arc or Gambier volcanic arc.

== See also ==
- Volcanism of Western Canada
- Flute Summit
- Piccolo Summit
- Whistler Mountain
