= Flute Summit (British Columbia) =

- Location within British Columbia
- Interactive map of Flute Summit

Highest point
- Elevation: 2,015 m (6,611 ft)
- Prominence: 127 m (417 ft)
- Coordinates: 50°02′24″N 122°55′32″W

Geography
- Location: British Columbia, Canada
- District: New Westminster Land District
- Parent range: Fitzsimmons Range
- Topo map: NTS 92J2 Whistler

Geology
- Rock age: Late Cretaceous
- Mountain type: Subvolcanic intrusion

Flute Summit is a flat-topped summit in the Fitzsimmons Range of the Garibaldi Ranges of the Pacific Ranges in southwestern British Columbia, Canada. It is located on the north side of Cheakamus Lake just southeast of the town of Whistler in Garibaldi Provincial Park. The mountain is part of a group of hills called the Musical Bumps.

== Geology ==
In 2004, volcanologist Jack Souther of the Geological Survey of Canada convinced that Flute Summit is an exposed subvolcanic intrusion of an ancient volcano. Nearby mountains, such as Whistler Mountain and Piccolo Summit, consist of lava flows that were erupted from a volcano about 100 million years ago during the Late Cretaceous period. The subvolcanic rock that comprises Flute Summit is igneous rock that solidified inside the Late Cretaceous volcano. Subvolcanic rocks can remain semi-molten and hot for hundreds or thousands of years. Because the magma that forms subvolcanic rocks solidifies and crystallizes slower than magma erupted on the surface, mineral grains grow larger. This produces a coarse grained rock. As subvolcanic magma heats and sets up convention in nearby groundwater, a hydrothermal system is created. This hydrothermal system can form quartz veins like those found at Flute Summit, combined with sulfurous gasses released from the magma, cause chemical alteration of both the crystallizing subvolcanic intrusion and the neighbouring rocks. This is how Flute Summit got its red colour.

== See also ==
- Gambier Group
- Volcanism of Western Canada
