= Mount Fitzsimmons (British Columbia) =

Mountain in the country of Canada

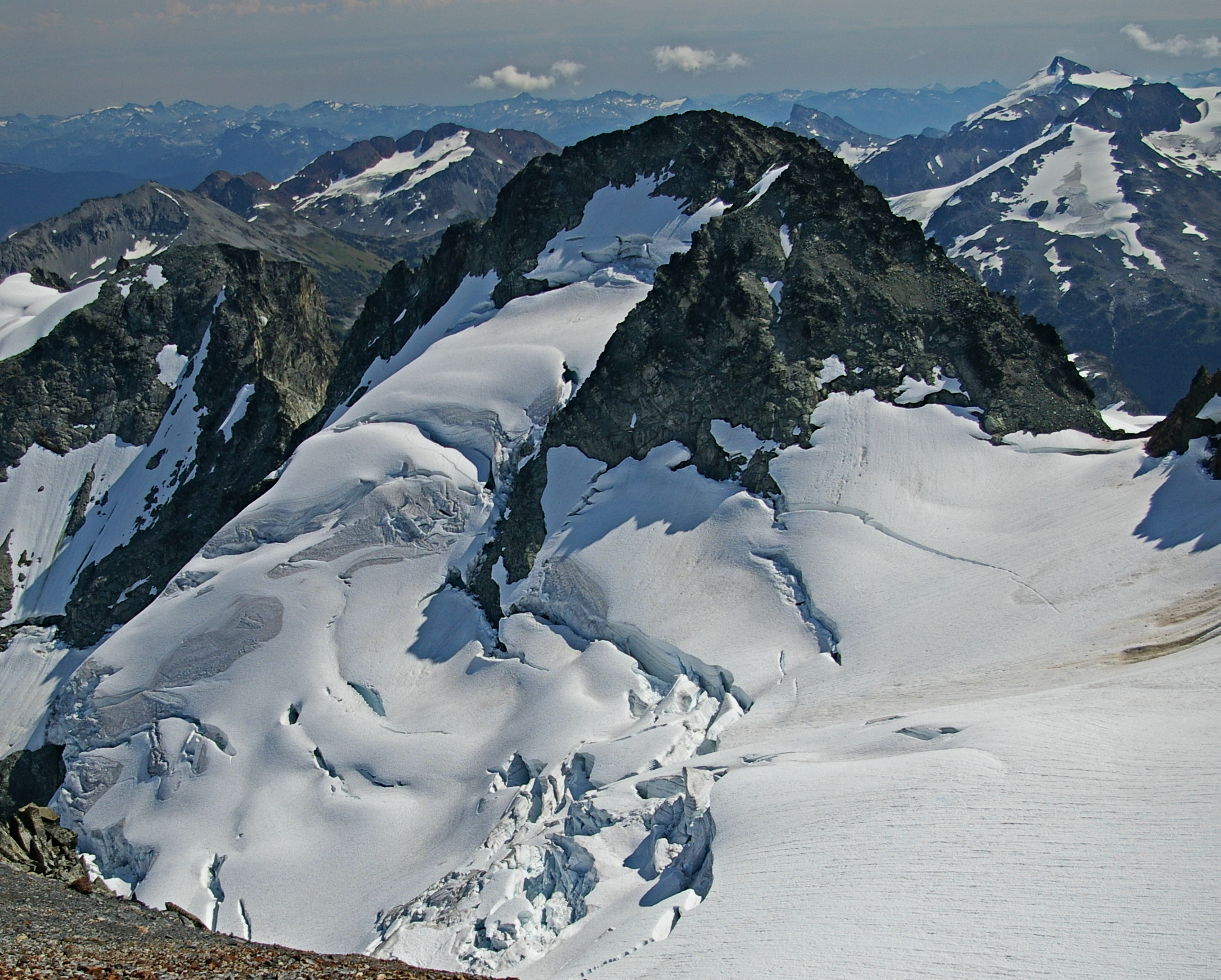
- Mount Fitzsimmons and Fitzsimmons Glacier as seen from Overlord Mountain

Highest point
- Elevation: 2,603 m (8,540 ft)
- Prominence: 133 m (436 ft)
- Parent peak: Overlord Mountain (2625 m)
- Listing: Mountains of British Columbia
- Coordinates: 50°0′50″N 122°48′24″W

Geography
- Location within British Columbia Location within Canada
- Interactive map of Mount Fitzsimmons
- Country: Canada
- Province: British Columbia
- District: New Westminster Land District
- Protected area: Garibaldi Provincial Park
- Parent range: Fitzsimmons Range; Garibaldi Ranges; Coast Ranges
- Topo map: NTS 92J2 Whistler

Climbing
- First ascent: 1924 by BCMC party
- Easiest route: class 2-3 via Diavolo Glacier

Mount Fitzsimmons is a 2,603-metre (8,540-foot) glacier-clad peak located in the Garibaldi Ranges of the Coast Mountains, in Garibaldi Provincial Park of southwestern British Columbia, Canada. It is the third-highest point of the Fitzsimmons Range, which is a subset of the Garibaldi Ranges. It is situated 15 km (9 mi) southeast of Whistler, and its nearest higher peak is Mount Benvolio, 0.5 km (0 mi) to the west-southwest. The Diavolo Glacier spreads out below the southeast aspect of the summit, and the Fitzsimmons Glacier descends the northwest slopes. Precipitation runoff from the peak and meltwater from its glaciers drains into tributaries of the Cheakamus River. The first ascent of the mountain was made on August 19, 1924, by a party of the British Columbia Mountaineering Club. The peak was named for prospector James Fitzsimmons, who built a trail along Fitzsimmons Creek in an effort to haul supplies to a small copper mine he staked and worked. The mountain's name was officially adopted on September 2, 1930, by the Geographical Names Board of Canada.

== Climate ==
Based on the Köppen climate classification, Mount Fitzsimmons is located in the marine west coast climate zone of western North America. Most weather fronts originate in the Pacific Ocean, and travel east toward the Coast Mountains where they are forced upward by the range (Orographic lift), causing them to drop their moisture in the form of rain or snowfall. As a result, the Coast Mountains experience high precipitation, especially during the winter months in the form of snowfall. Winter temperatures can drop below −20 °C with wind chill factors below −30 °C. The months July through September offer the most favorable weather for climbing Mount Fitzsimmons.

== Climbing routes ==
Established climbing routes:

- South Face - class 2-3 first ascent 1924
- West Ridge - class 3 first ascent 1964
- North Face - class 3 first ascent 1981

== Gallery ==
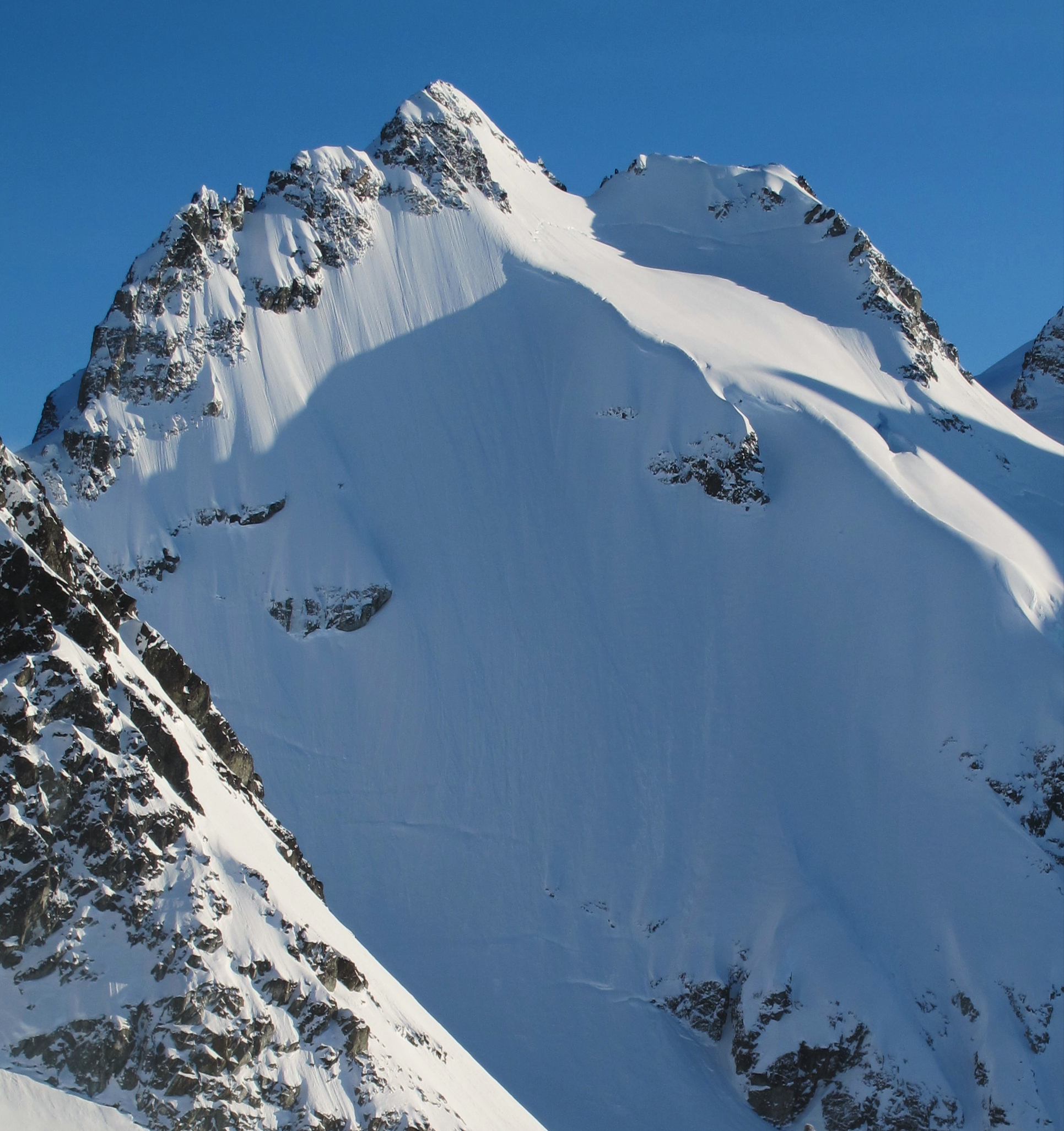
Mount Fitzsimmons' northeast face

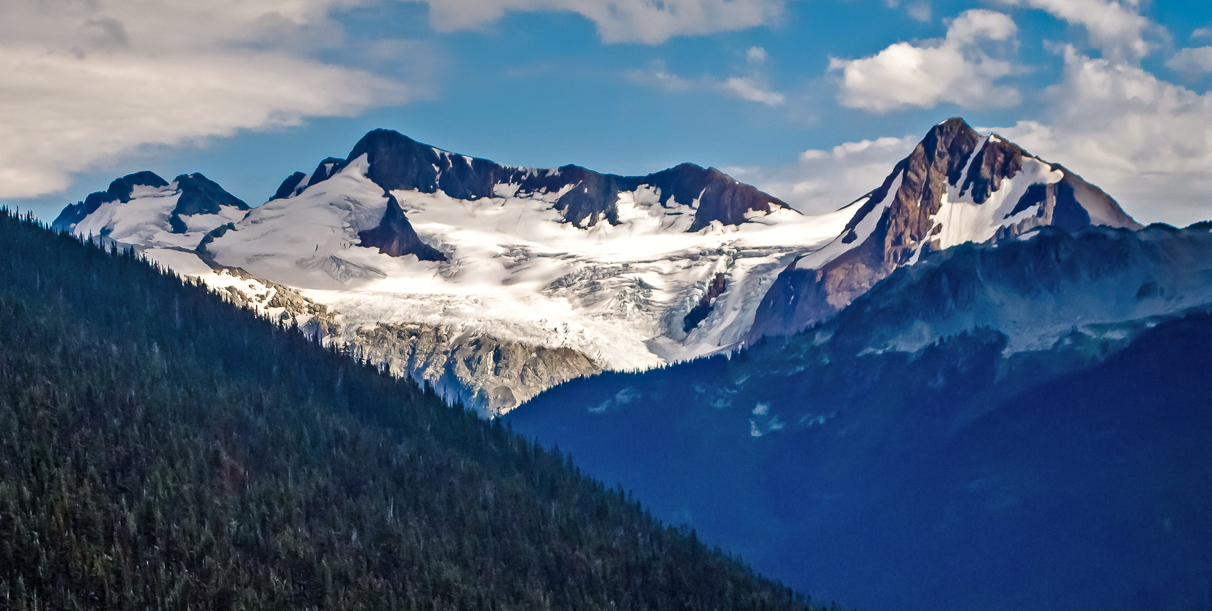
Left to right: Mount Fitzsimmons, Overlord Mountain and Fissile Peak

== See also ==
- Geography of British Columbia
- Geology of British Columbia
