= Whistler Mountain =

Mountain in British Columbia, Canada

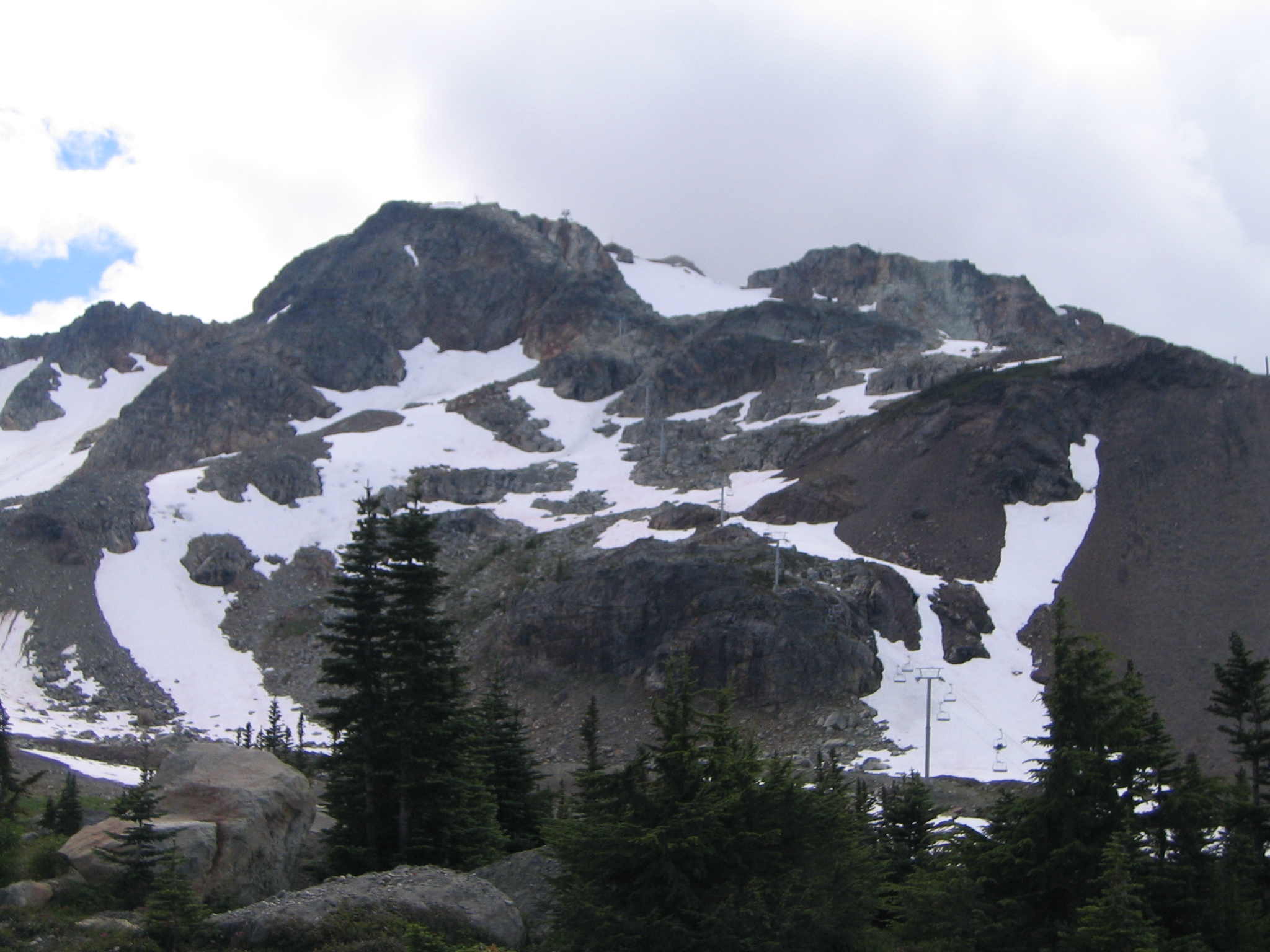
- The peak of Whistler Mountain as seen in the summer of 2007. The chairlift pictured is the Peak Chair.

Highest point
- Elevation: 2,181 m (7,156 ft)
- Prominence: 471 m (1,545 ft)
- Coordinates: 50°03′33″N 122°57′25″W

Geography
- Location within British Columbia Location within Canada
- Interactive map of Whistler Mountain
- Location: British Columbia, Canada
- District: New Westminster Land District
- Parent range: Fitzsimmons Range
- Topo map: NTS 92J2 Whistler

Climbing
- Easiest route: Ski lifts

Whistler Mountain (Lillooet/Ucwalmícwts: Nsqwítsu) is a mountain in the Fitzsimmons Range of the Pacific Ranges of the Coast Mountains, located on the northwestern edge of Garibaldi Provincial Park. It is the location of the Whistler-Blackcomb ski resort and the town of Whistler, British Columbia, Canada, and played host to the 2010 Winter Olympics.

Previously, the mountain was called "London Mountain," named after a mining claim in the area and the fog at the mountain's base. The locality was called Alta Lake before the creation of the Resort Municipality of Whistler in the 1970s, but the mountain's name had already been changed in 1965. With the advent of the ski resort in the late 1960s, the name was changed to "Whistler" to represent the whistling calls of the marmots, which are also known as "whistlers", that live in the alpine areas of the mountain.

Because of the mountain's proximity to Garibaldi Provincial Park, ski lifts are regularly used to quickly reach the alpine and ski tour into the park. The summit is home to the Whistler Peak chair, and this makes it one of the most travelled summits in British Columbia.

The mountain forms part of a major ski and snowboard resort, the largest in North America.

== Geology ==
Whistler Mountain contains shale that originated as mud on the seafloor of a former ocean. This same shale formation forms rocks in other locations throughout southwestern British Columbia. The most common rocks that comprise Whistler Mountain are andesite and dacite lava flows. These lava flows and the associated shale form part of a rock assemblage called the Gambier Group. This geologic group was created within a shallow underwater basin about 100 million years ago during the Early Cretaceous period. Granular material, such as clay, sand, and silt, was carried into the ancient ocean by rivers that existed during the Cretaceous period. As Cretaceous rivers continuously sent granular material into the former ocean, it was deposited yearly to eventually form layers of sedimentary material. Once the sedimentary material was compressed, it created the shale that now forms portions of Whistler Mountain. The andesite and dacite lava flows were deposited when volcanic eruptions created a series of volcanic islands and produced lava flows in the ancient ocean.

Once the volcanic and sedimentary rocks of the Gambier Group were formed, they began to deform, crumple and uplift due to the extreme pressures created by the movement of the North American Plate and the tectonic plates in the Pacific Ocean. The large masses of solidified lava that formerly created the volcanic island chain and underwater lava flows yielded by demolishing into massive, mountain-sized blocks while the less dense, thinly layered shale was compressed, folded, and crushed between the associated lavas. In contrast, nearby volcanic landforms in the Garibaldi Lake area, such as The Black Tusk, are of relatively recent volcanic origin and form part of a chain of volcanoes called the Garibaldi Volcanic Belt.

== Climate ==
There is a weather station near the summit of Whistler Mountain at the Roundhouse Lodge, located at an elevation of 1835 m (6020 ft). Whistler Roundhouse has a dry-summer subalpine climate (Köppen Dsc), bordering on an Alpine climate (Köppen ET).

Climate data for Whistler Roundhouse, British Columbia, 2005-2020 normals, 1972-2020 extremes: 1835m (6020ft)
Month	Jan	Feb	Mar	Apr	May	Jun	Jul	Aug	Sep	Oct	Nov	Dec	Year
Record high °C (°F)	13 (56)	13 (55)	13 (55)	16 (61)	21 (70)	25 (77)	26 (79)	26 (78)	25 (77)	20 (68)	13 (55)	14 (57)	26 (79)
Mean maximum °C (°F)	6.5 (43.7)	6.1 (43.0)	5.8 (42.4)	8.6 (47.5)	11.7 (53.1)	17.5 (63.5)	22.0 (71.6)	21.7 (71.1)	19.6 (67.3)	7.2 (45.0)	4.2 (39.6)	4.5 (40.1)	23.5 (74.3)
Mean daily maximum °C (°F)	−1.4 (29.5)	−2.7 (27.2)	−1.6 (29.1)	0.8 (33.4)	6.7 (44.1)	9.8 (49.7)	14.1 (57.3)	14.3 (57.8)	10.9 (51.7)	5.1 (41.1)	−2.1 (28.2)	−2.8 (26.9)	4.3 (39.7)
Daily mean °C (°F)	−3.9 (24.9)	−5.3 (22.4)	−4.2 (24.4)	−1.9 (28.5)	3.8 (38.9)	6.8 (44.3)	10.8 (51.4)	11.4 (52.5)	8.1 (46.5)	1.9 (35.4)	−4.7 (23.5)	−5.3 (22.5)	1.5 (34.6)
Mean daily minimum °C (°F)	−6.4 (20.5)	−8.0 (17.6)	−6.8 (19.7)	−4.7 (23.6)	0.9 (33.7)	3.8 (38.9)	7.5 (45.5)	7.8 (46.1)	5.1 (41.2)	−1.4 (29.4)	−6.9 (19.5)	−7.7 (18.1)	−1.4 (29.5)
Mean minimum °C (°F)	−16.1 (3.0)	−16.4 (2.4)	−14.4 (6.0)	−10.6 (13.0)	−2.9 (26.8)	−1.0 (30.2)	1.2 (34.2)	2.4 (36.4)	−1.2 (29.9)	−3.2 (26.2)	−13.7 (7.3)	−16.3 (2.7)	−22.4 (−8.4)
Record low °C (°F)	−29 (−20)	−33 (−28)	−24 (−12)	−19 (−3)	−9 (15)	−6 (21)	−5 (23)	−2 (28)	−10 (14)	−23 (−9)	−31 (−24)	−29 (−21)	−33 (−28)
Average precipitation mm (inches)	265 (10.44)	151 (5.95)	231 (9.10)	98 (3.84)	30 (1.17)	45 (1.78)	33 (1.30)	32 (1.25)	53 (2.08)	53 (2.07)	149 (5.86)	230 (9.04)	1,370 (53.88)
Average snowfall cm (inches)	214 (84.3)	136 (53.4)	218 (86.0)	86 (33.8)	5.6 (2.2)	1.5 (0.6)	0.0 (0.0)	0.0 (0.0)	0.51 (0.2)	27 (10.6)	130 (51.2)	206 (81.0)	1,024.61 (403.3)
Source: XMACIS2 (normals, extremes & precip/snow)

== Gallery ==
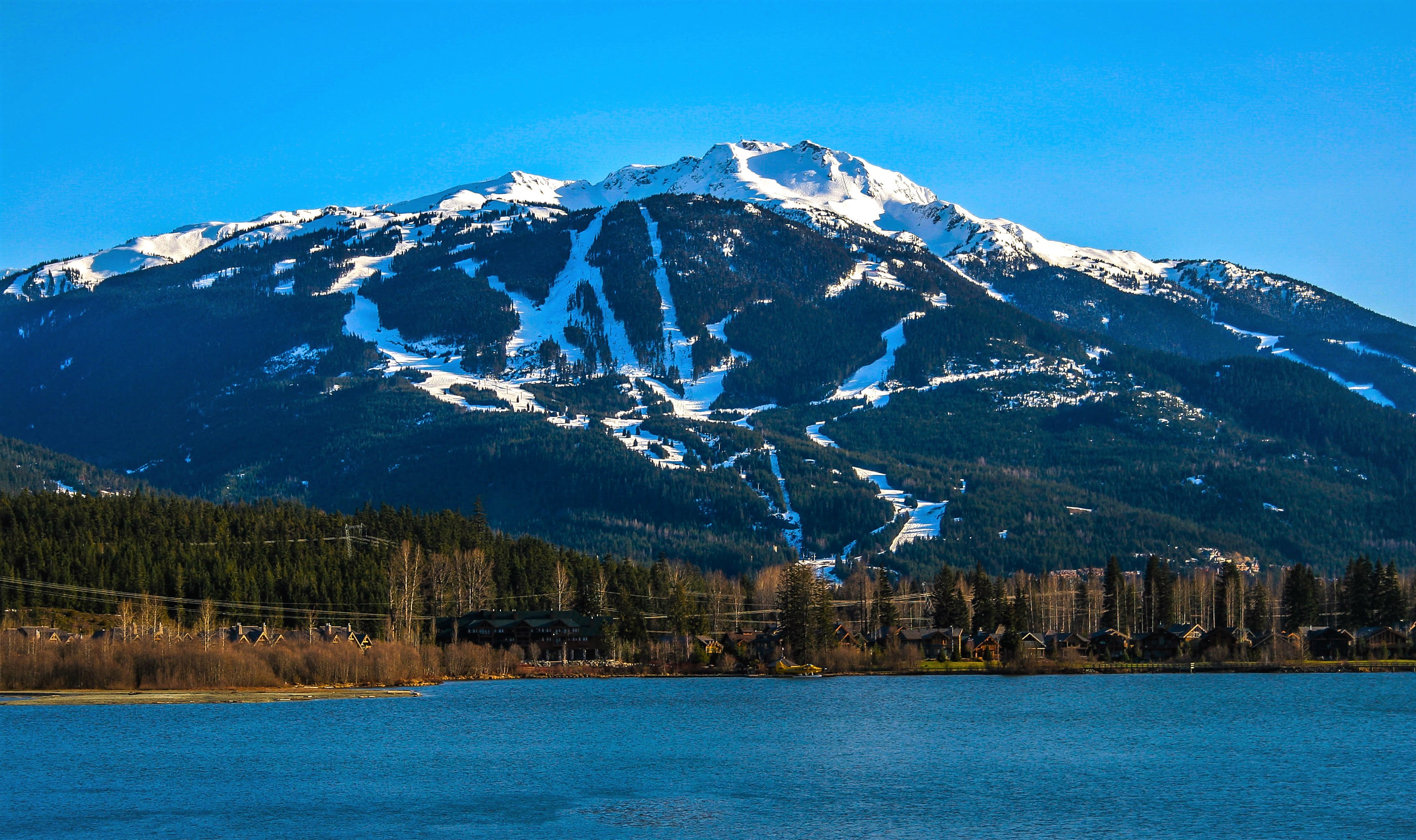
Whistler Mountain, north aspect

Whistler Mountain On April 26, 2009

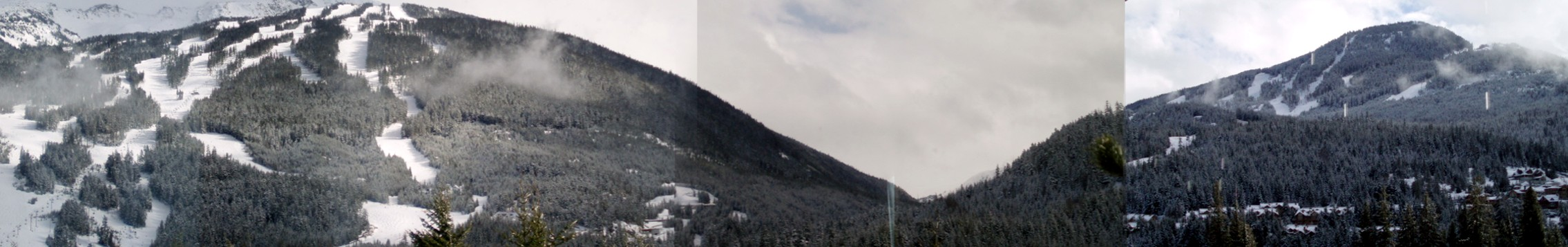
A panorama of Whistler and Blackcomb mountains taken in March, 2007.

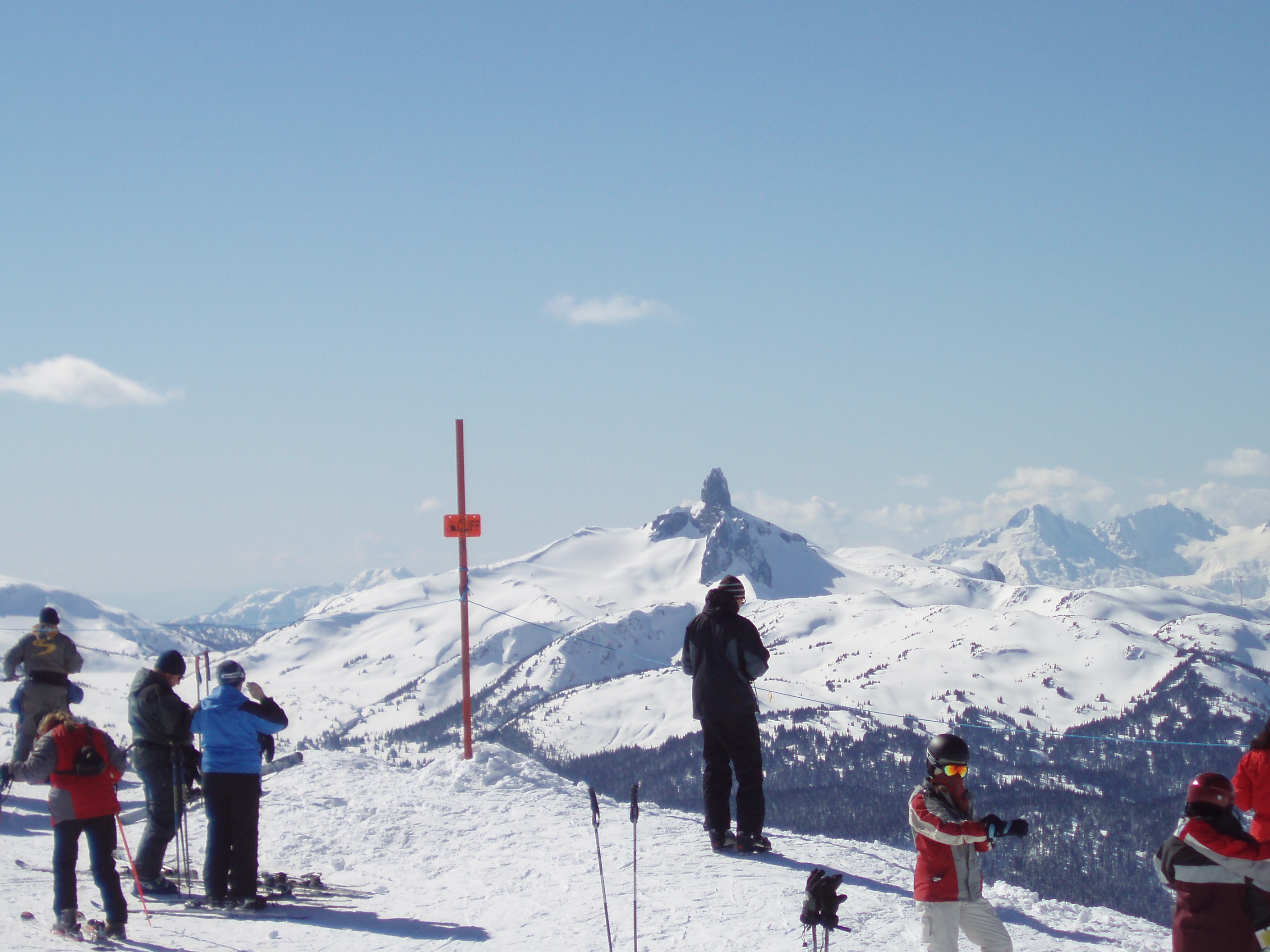
The Black Tusk as seen from the unload area at the top of the Peak Express.

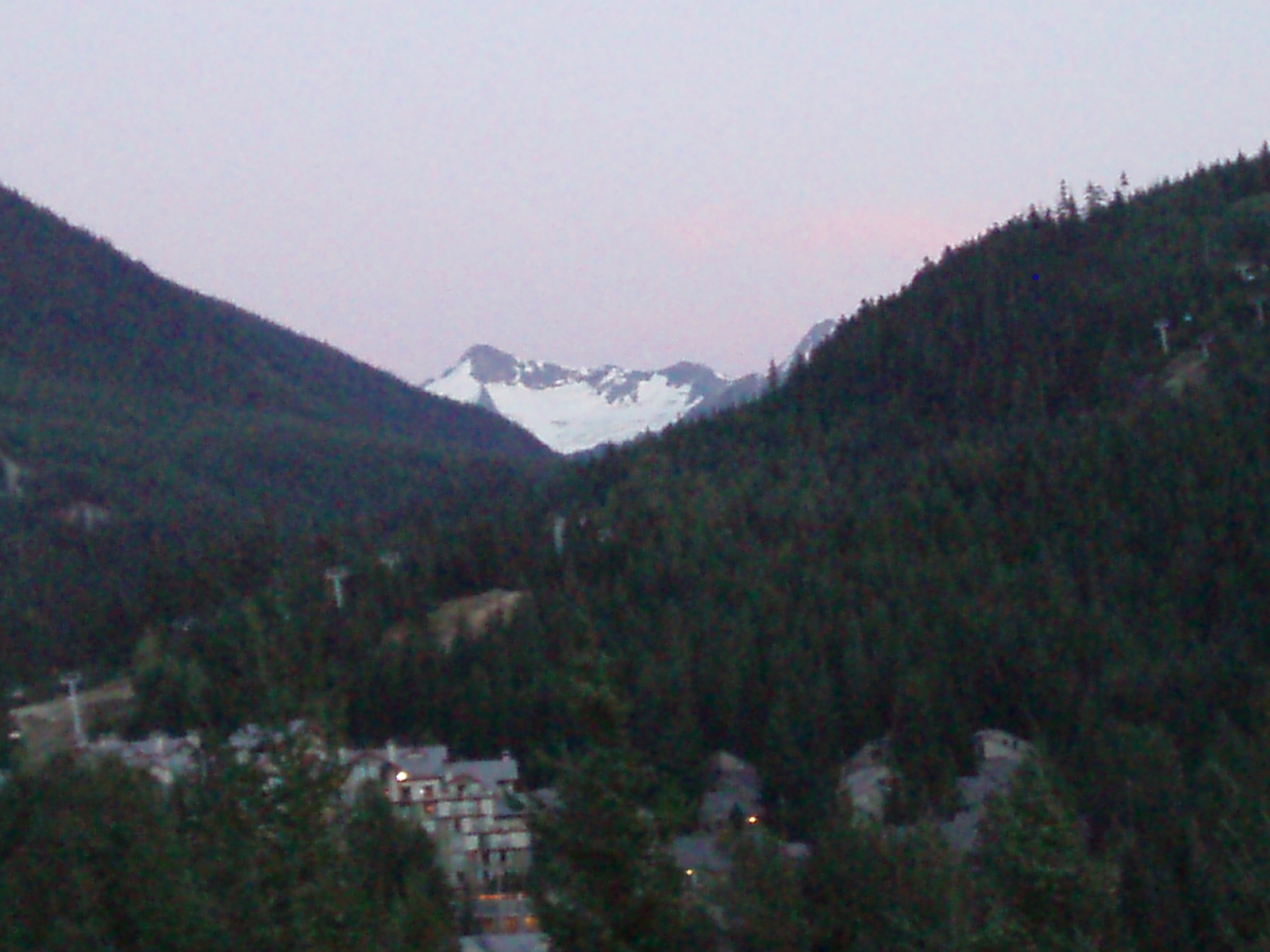
Singing Pass in August as seen between Whistler and Blackcomb.

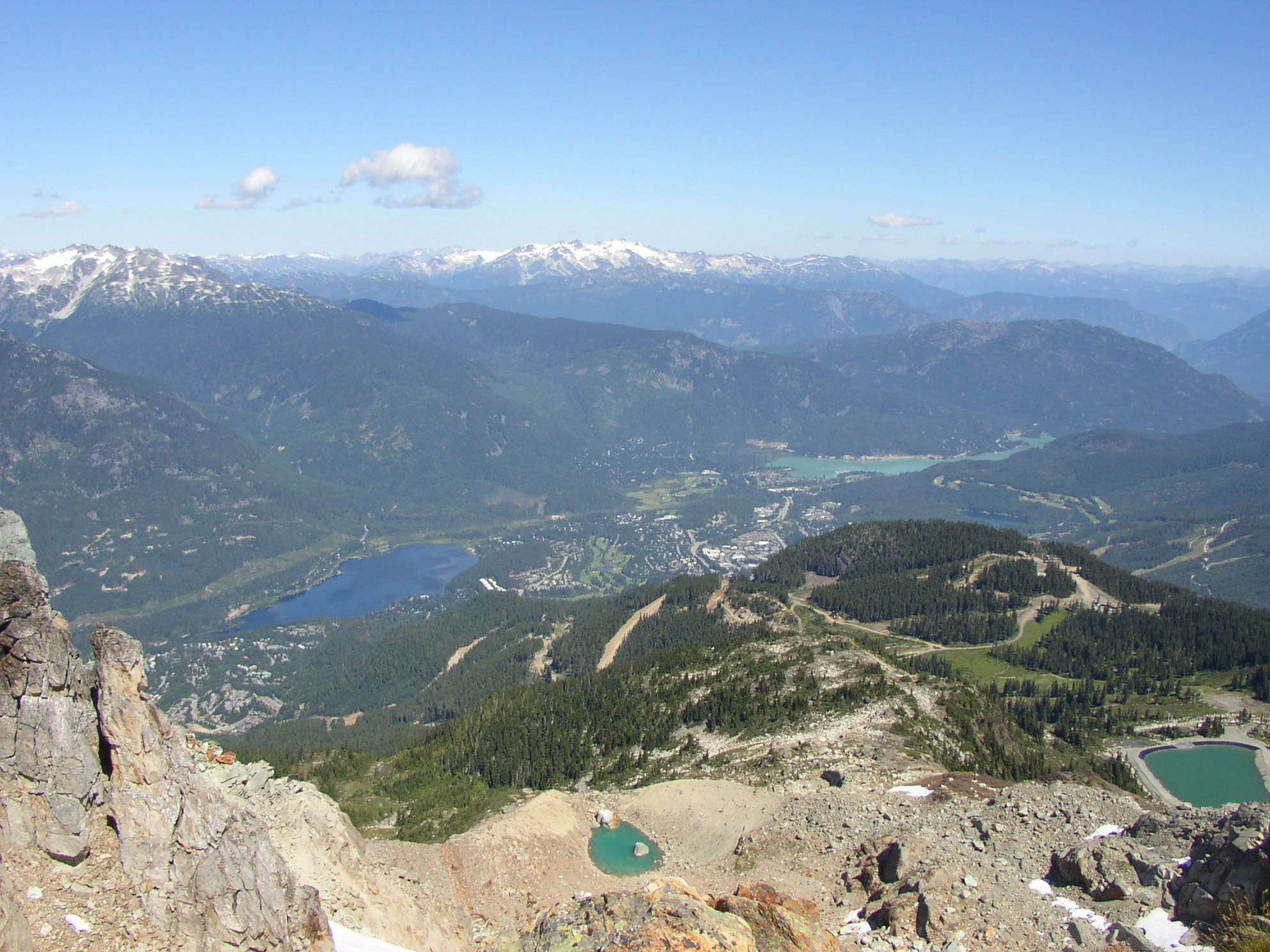
View of Whistler from Whistler mountain.

== See also ==
- Whistler, British Columbia
- Whistler Blackcomb
- Flute Summit
- Piccolo Summit
