= Mount Benvolio =

Mountain in the country of Canada

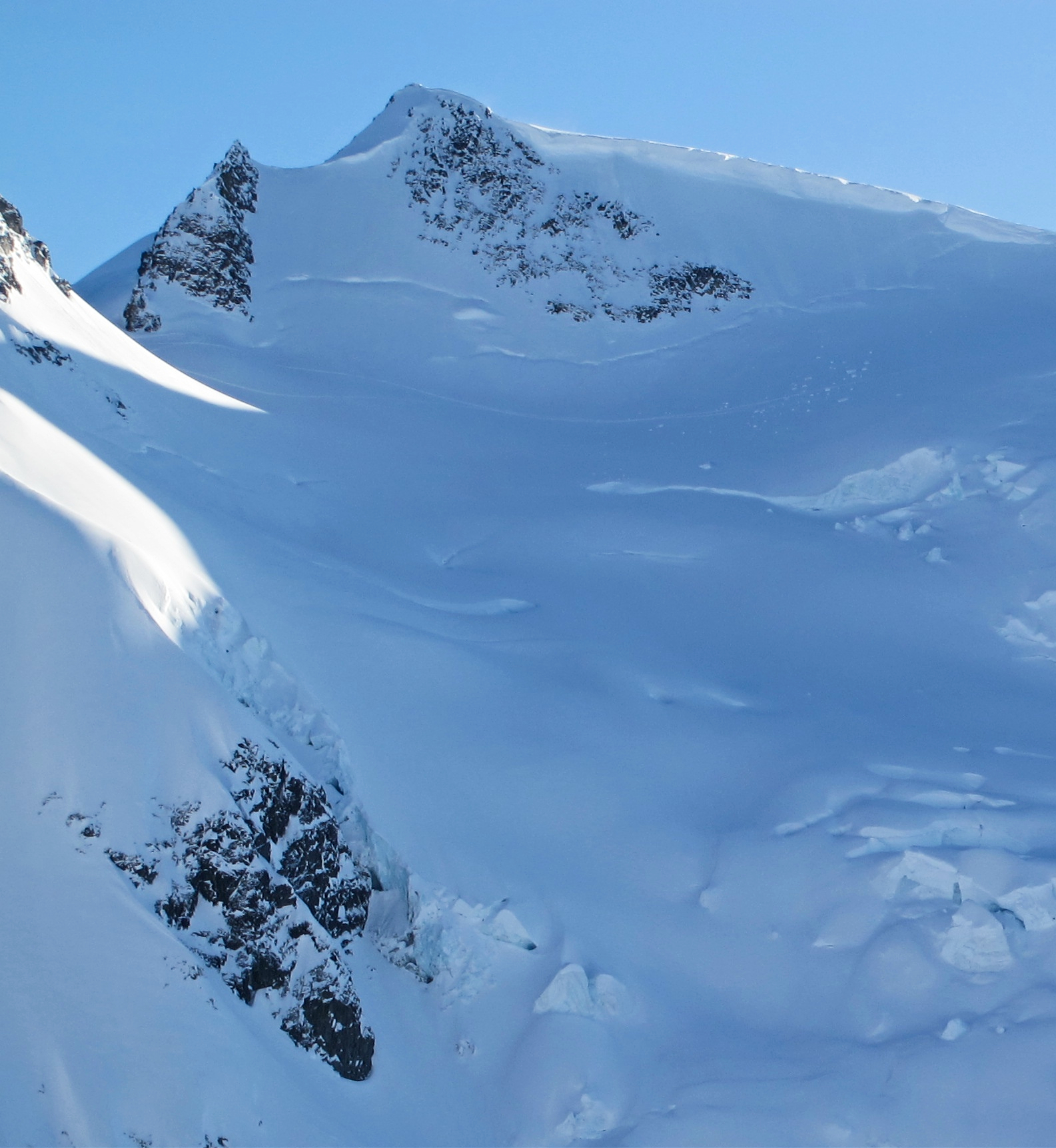
- Mount Benvolio, north aspect

Highest point
- Elevation: 2,613 m (8,573 ft)
- Prominence: 73 m (240 ft)
- Parent peak: Overlord Mountain (2625 m)
- Listing: Mountains of British Columbia
- Coordinates: 50°0′43″N 122°48′50″W

Geography
- Location within British Columbia Location within Canada
- Interactive map of Mount Benvolio
- Location: Garibaldi Provincial Park; British Columbia, Canada
- District: New Westminster Land District
- Parent range: Fitzsimmons Range; Garibaldi Ranges; Coast Ranges
- Topo map: NTS 92J2 Whistler

Climbing
- First ascent: 1923 by Phyllis Munday and Don Munday
- Easiest route: class 2 via Benvolio Glacier

Mount Benvolio is a 2,613-metre (8,573-foot) glacier-clad peak located in the Garibaldi Ranges of the Coast Mountains, in Garibaldi Provincial Park of southwestern British Columbia, Canada. It is the second-highest point of the Fitzsimmons Range, which is a subset of the Garibaldi Ranges. It is situated 15 km (9 mi) southeast of Whistler, and its nearest higher peak is Overlord Mountain, 0.7 km (0 mi) to the northwest. The Benvolio Glacier is set on the western slope of the peak, the Diavolo Glacier spreads out below the eastern aspect of the summit, and the Fitzsimmons Glacier descends the north slope. Precipitation runoff from the peak and meltwater from its glaciers drains into tributaries of the Cheakamus River.

== History ==
The first ascent of the mountain was made in 1923 by Phyllis Munday and Don Munday via the Benvolio Glacier. The peak was named in 1964 by a climbing party from the Alpine Club of Canada to commemorate the 400th anniversary of the birth of William Shakespeare. Viewed from the north, this peak stands out between Overlord Mountain and Mount Fitzsimmons, however its beauty from afar is somewhat dulled close up. Shakespeare's Romeo and Juliet had a character named Benvolio who shared similar traits. The mountain's name was officially adopted on August 27, 1965, by the Geographical Names Board of Canada.

== Climate ==
Based on the Köppen climate classification, Mount Benvolio is located in the marine west coast climate zone of western North America. Most weather fronts originate in the Pacific Ocean, and travel east toward the Coast Mountains where they are forced upward by the range (Orographic lift), causing them to drop their moisture in the form of rain or snowfall. As a result, the Coast Mountains experience high precipitation, especially during the winter months in the form of snowfall. Temperatures can drop below −20 °C with wind chill factors below −30 °C. The months July through September offer the most favorable weather for climbing Mount Benvolio.

== Gallery ==
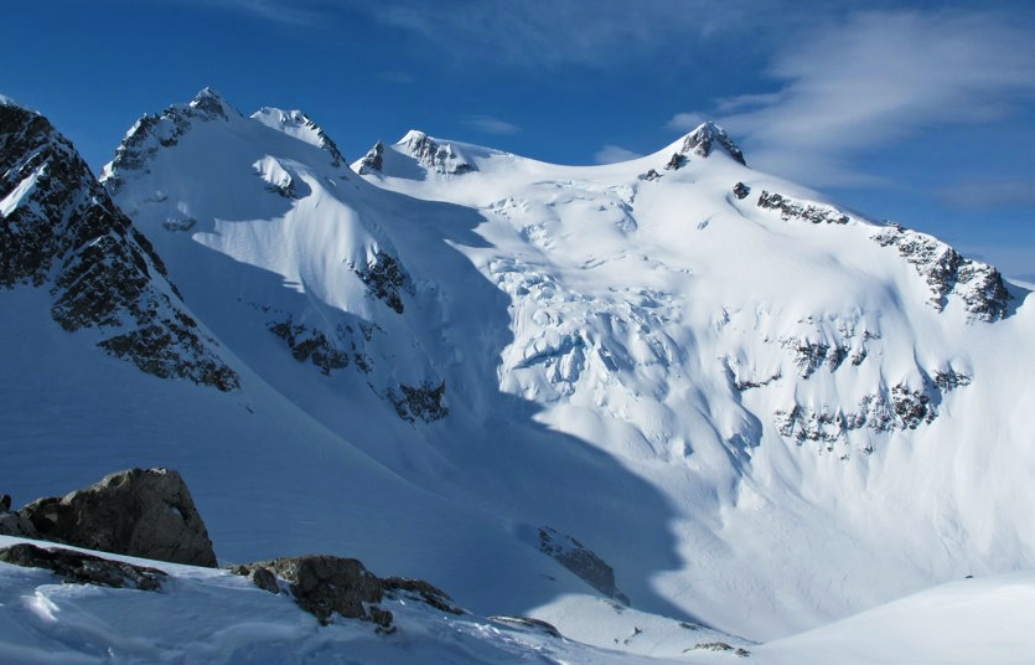
Mount Fitzsimmons (left), Mount Benvolio (centre) and Overlord Mountain (right)

== See also ==
- Geography of British Columbia
- Geology of British Columbia
