= Overlord Mountain =

Mountain in the country of Canada

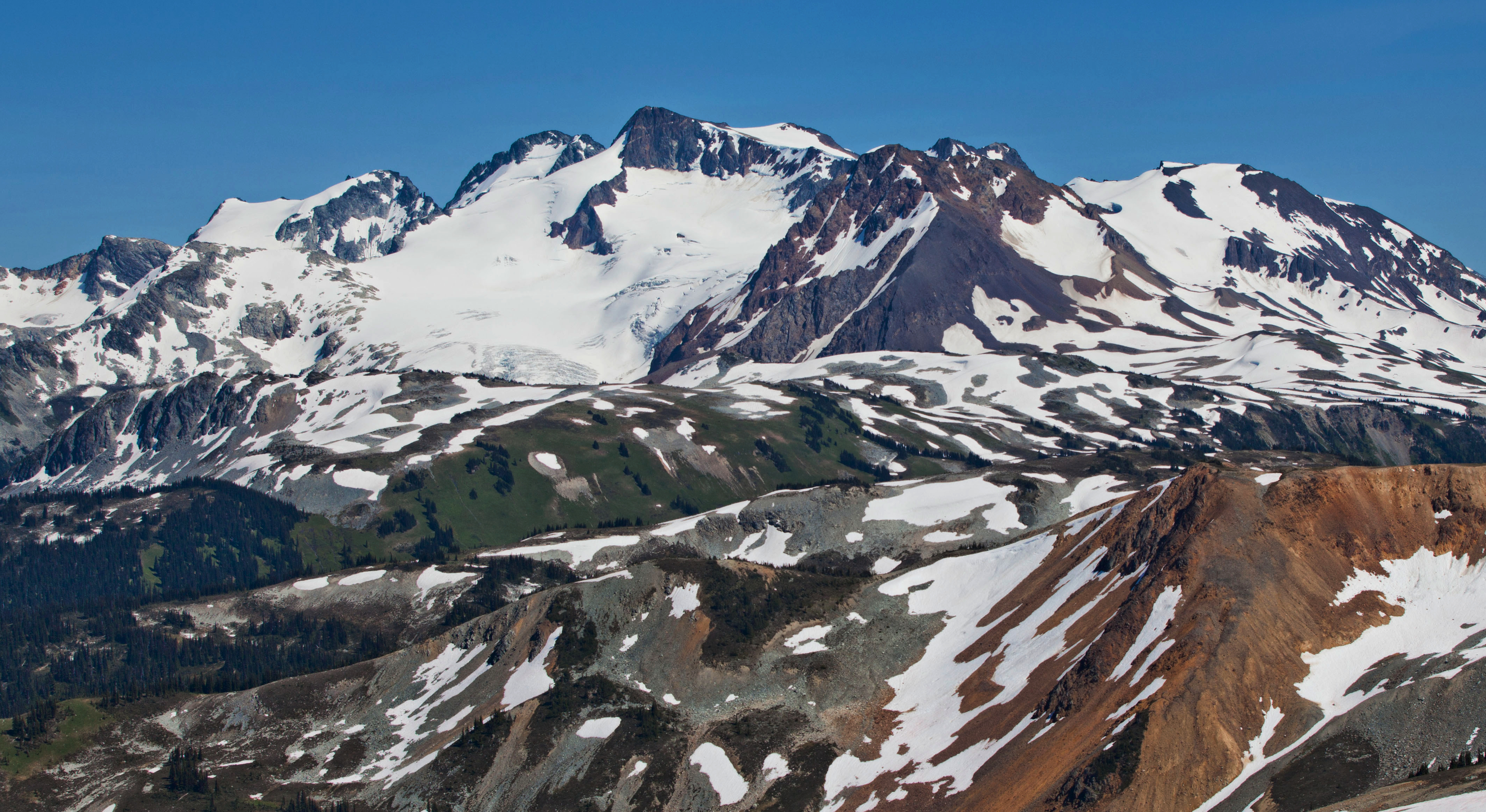
- Overlord Massif, seen from Whistler Mountain

Highest point
- Elevation: 2,625 m (8,612 ft)
- Prominence: 415 m (1,362 ft)
- Parent peak: Mount Macbeth (2639 m)
- Listing: Mountains of British Columbia
- Coordinates: 50°0′56″N 122°49′15″W

Geography
- Location within British Columbia Location within Canada
- Interactive map of Overlord Mountain
- Country: Canada
- Province: British Columbia
- District: New Westminster Land District
- Protected area: Garibaldi Provincial Park
- Parent range: Fitzsimmons Range; Garibaldi Ranges; Coast Ranges
- Topo map: NTS 92J2 Whistler

Climbing
- First ascent: 1923 by Phyllis Munday, Don Munday
- Easiest route: class 2 via Benvolio Glacier

Overlord Mountain is a 2,625-metre (8,612-foot) glacier-clad peak located in the Garibaldi Ranges of the Coast Mountains, in Garibaldi Provincial Park of southwestern British Columbia, Canada. It is the highest point of the Fitzsimmons Range, which is a subset of the Garibaldi Ranges, and can be readily seen from the Whistler Blackcomb ski area. It is situated 15 km (9 mi) southeast of Whistler, and its nearest higher peak is Mount Macbeth, 3 km (2 mi) to the north-northeast. The Benvolio Glacier rests below the south aspect of the summit, the Fitzsimmons Glacier on the east aspect, and the expansive Overlord Glacier spans the northern and western aspects of the mountain. Precipitation runoff from the peak and meltwater from its glaciers drains into tributaries of the Cheakamus River. The first ascent of the mountain was made in 1923 by Phyllis Munday and Don Munday via the Benvolio Glacier. The mountain's descriptive name was recommended by the Garibaldi Park Board and officially adopted on September 2, 1930, by the Geographical Names Board of Canada.

== Climate ==
Based on the Köppen climate classification, Overlord Mountain is located in the marine west coast climate zone of western North America. Most weather fronts originate in the Pacific Ocean, and travel east toward the Coast Mountains where they are forced upward by the range (Orographic lift), causing them to drop their moisture in the form of rain or snowfall. As a result, the Coast Mountains experience high precipitation, especially during the winter months in the form of snowfall. Temperatures can drop below −20 °C with wind chill factors below −30 °C. The months July through September offer the most favorable weather for climbing Overlord Mountain.

== Climbing Routes ==
Established climbing routes on Overlord Mountain:

- Benvolio Glacier - class 2 First Ascent 1923
- West Ridge - class 4
- East Ridge
- North Ridge

== Gallery ==
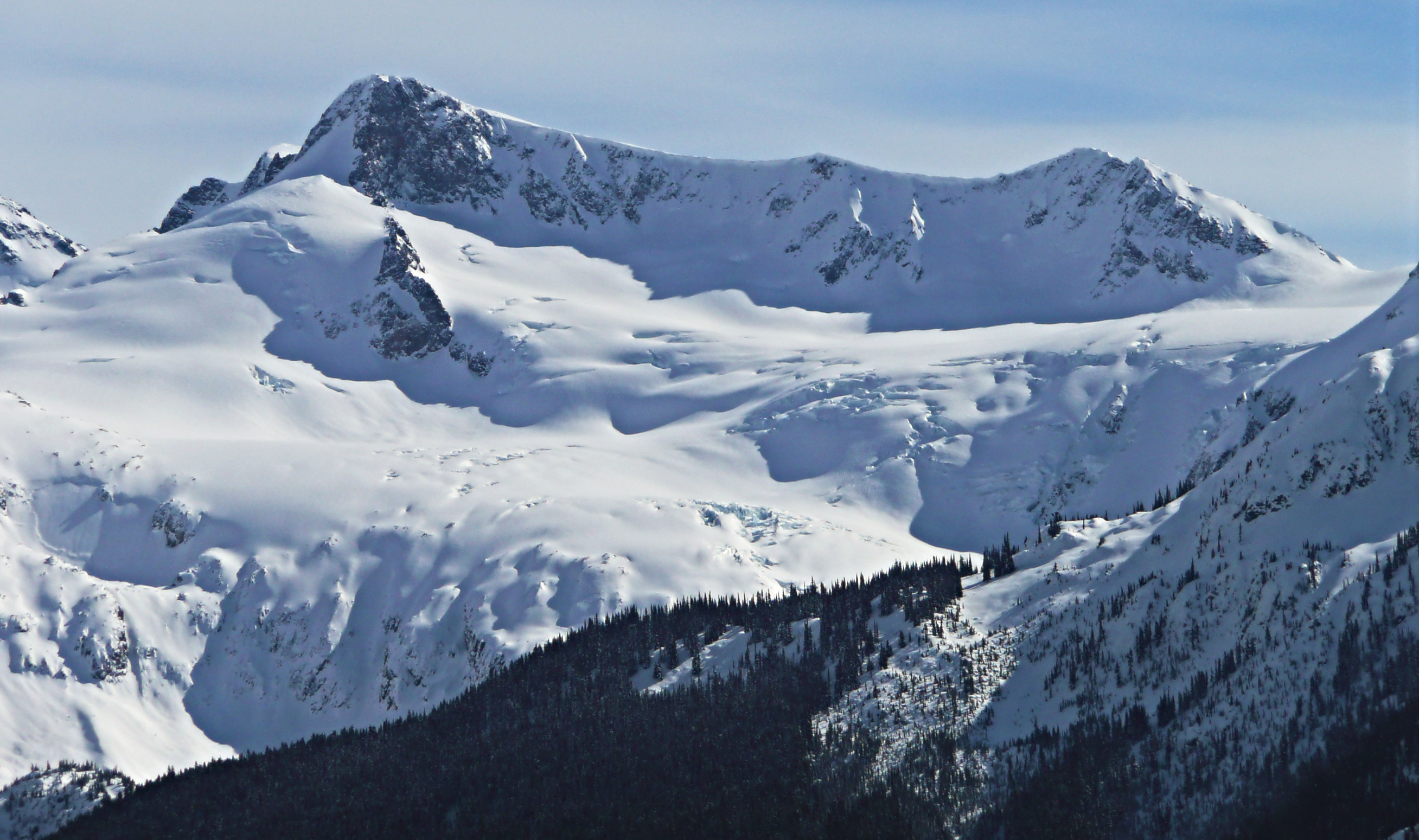
Overlord Mountain in winter

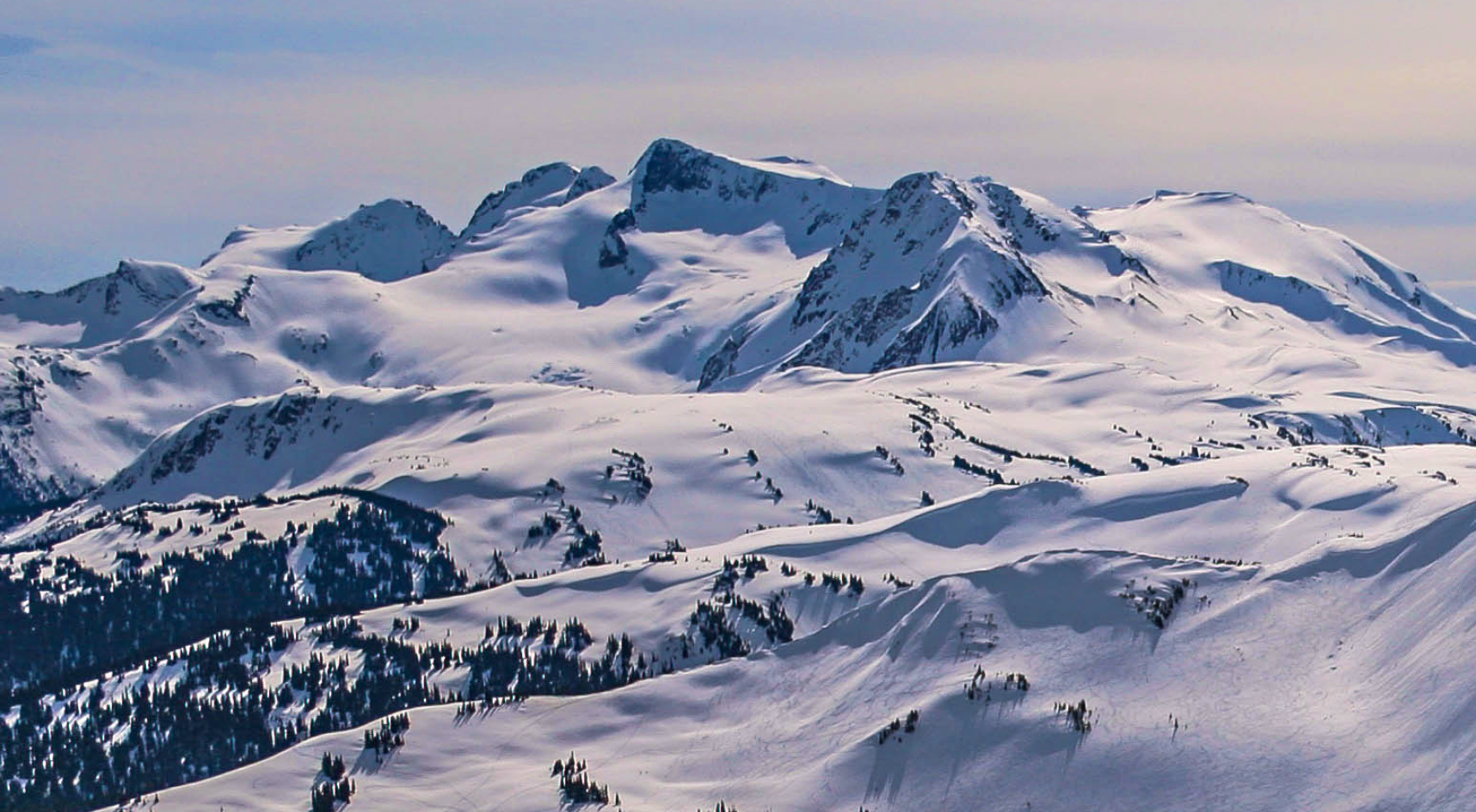
Overlord Mountain from Whistler Mountain

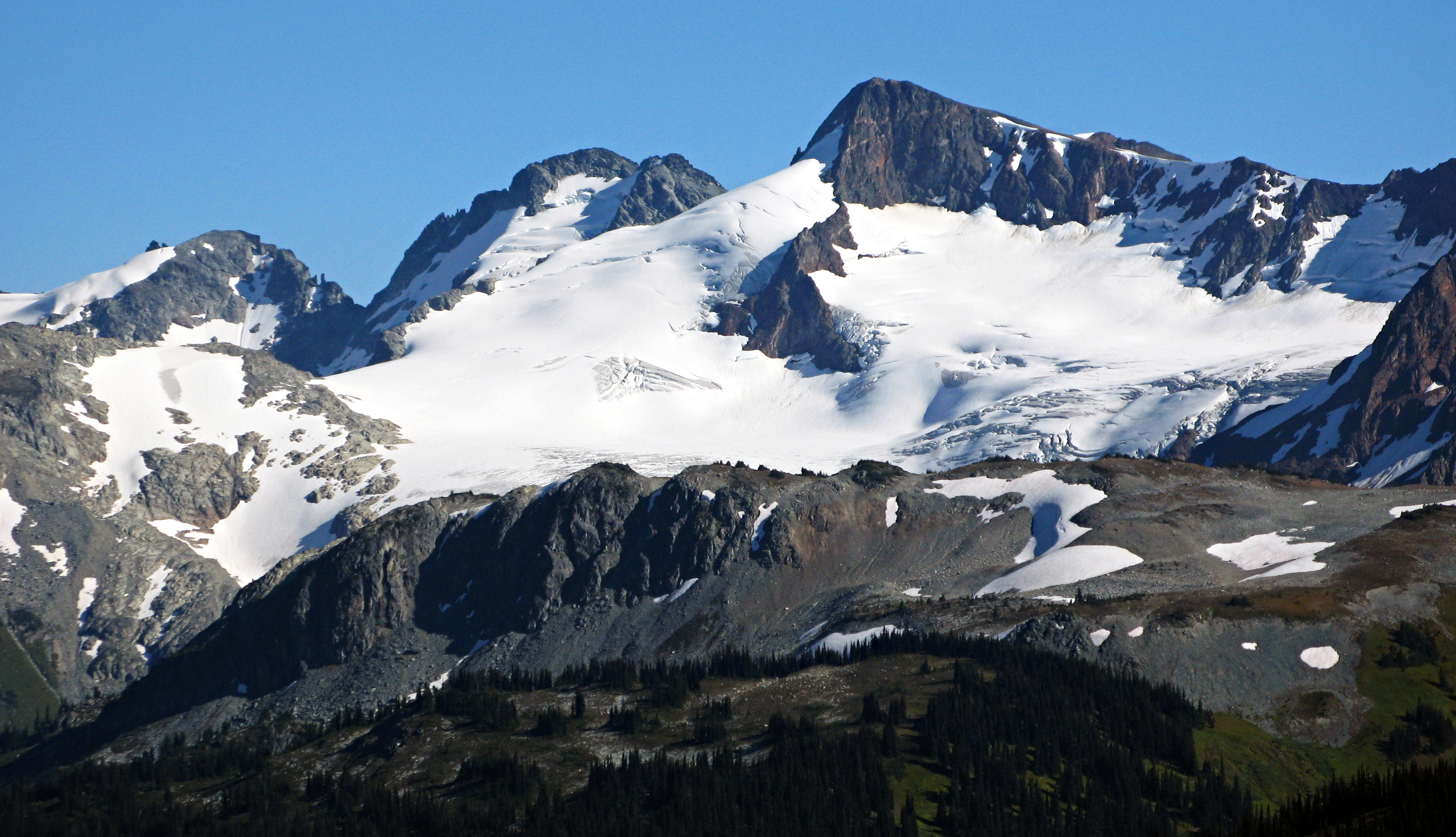
Overlord Mountain and Overlord Glacier

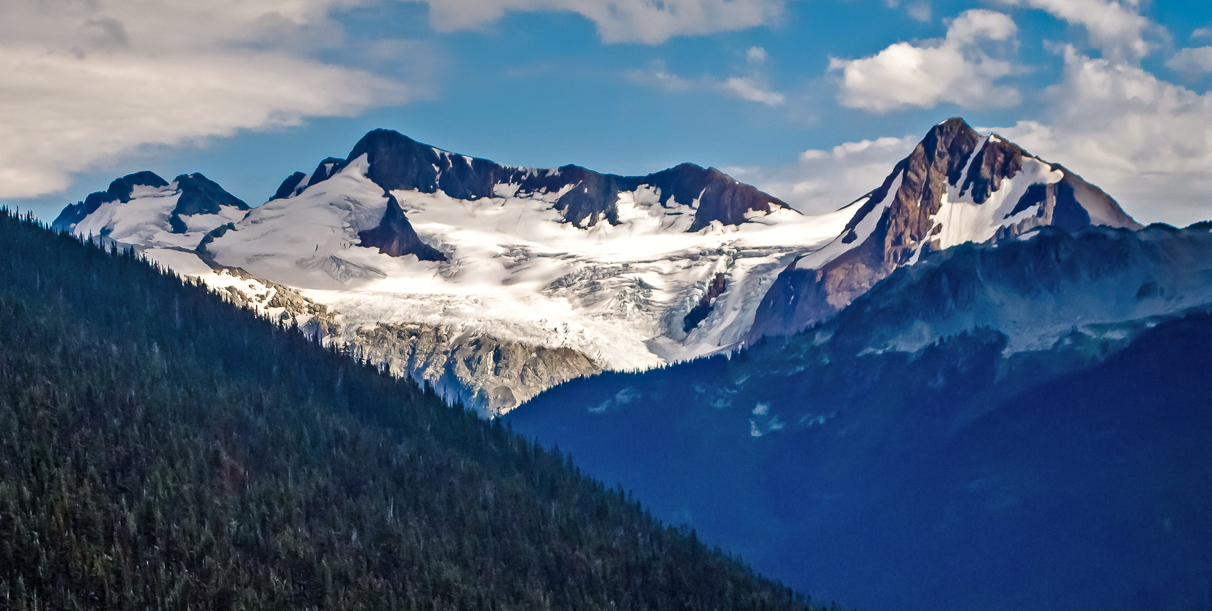
Left to right: Mt. Fitzsimmons, Overlord Mountain, Fissile Peak

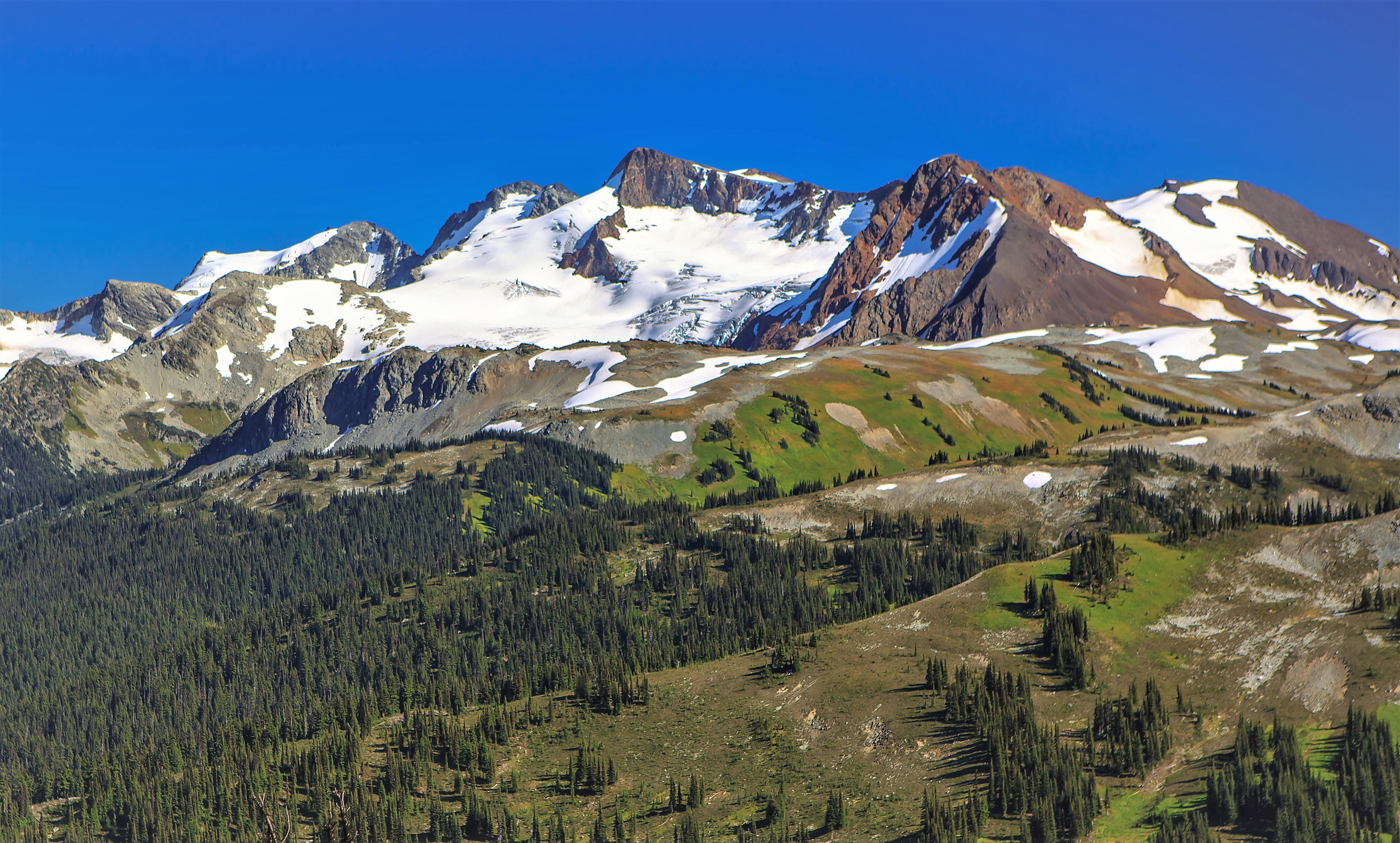

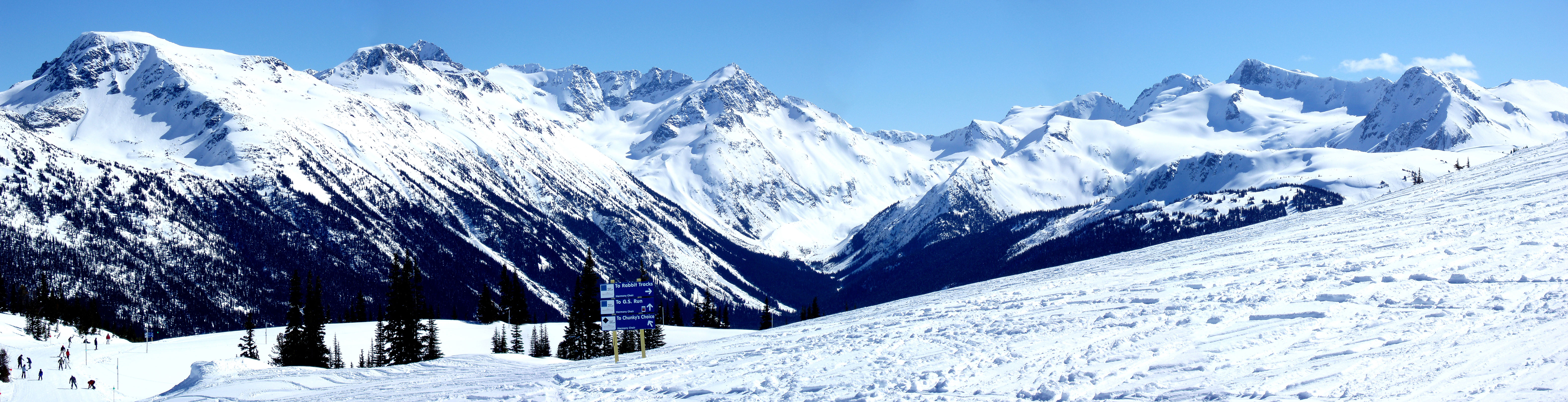
Overlord Mountain (right) from slopes of Whistler. Spearhead Range to left

== See also ==
- Geography of British Columbia
- Geology of British Columbia
