= Fitzsimmons Range =

Mountain range in British Columbia, Canada

- Location within British Columbia

Highest point
- Peak: Overlord Mountain
- Elevation: 2,625 m (8,612 ft)
- Coordinates: 50°00′56″N 122°49′15″W

Geography
- Country: Canada
- Province: British Columbia
- Range coordinates: 50°02′N 122°54′W
- Parent range: Garibaldi Ranges

The Fitzsimmons Range is a small mountain range on the northwestern edge of the Garibaldi Ranges in southwestern British Columbia, Canada, located between the valleys of Cheakamus Lake (SW) and Fitzsimmons Creek (NE). Its most famous summit is Whistler Mountain, which overlooks the resort town of Whistler and is one of the two mountains forming the Whistler Blackcomb ski resort. Most of the range is within Garibaldi Provincial Park, while its northeastern extremity is part of the resort municipality, and of the lands associated with the ski resort operation. Other summits in the range include Oboe Summit, Piccolo Summit and Flute Summit, which are hillocks along the ridge running southeast from Whistler Mountain and were named in association with the renaming of Whistler. Beyond them is Singing Pass and Mount Fitzsimmons 2603 m (8540 ft) which is at the opposite end of the range from Whistler Mountain and the location of Fitzsimmons Glacier, which is the source of Fitzsimmons Creek.

Mount Fitzsimmons is part of the Overlord Massif, which is named for the highest peak in the range, Overlord Mountain, 2625 m (8612 ft), just to its west. The massif forms a pyramidal massif visible from Whistler Village; another summit in the massif is Mount Benvolio 2613 m (8573 ft). Other peaks, which lie south of the Overlord massif, are Cheakamus Mountain 2588 m (8491 ft), Angelo Peak 2561 m (8402 ft) and Diavolo Peak 2569 m (8428 ft).
