= Spearhead =

A spearhead is the sharpened point (head) of a spear, similar to an arrowhead. It is often a separate piece called a projectile point.

Spearhead may also refer to:

== Armed conflict ==
- Armoured spearhead, a tactical formation
- HMS Spearhead (P263), an S class submarine of the Royal Navy
- Spearhead class Joint High Speed Vessel
- Spearhead, nickname of the 3rd Armored Division (United States) in the United States Army
- The Spearhead, nickname of the 5th Marine Division (United States) of the United States Marine Corps
- Spearhead, nickname of the 3rd Infantry Division (Philippines)
- Spearhead Ltd., an Israeli private mercenary company owned by Yair Klein

== Film and television ==
- Spearhead (TV series), a British television series
- Spearhead from Space, a 1970 serial in the British television series Doctor Who

== Geography ==
- The Spearhead, a peak in Whistler, British Columbia
- Spearhead Glacier, a glacier named after the associated peak in Whistler, British Columbia
- Spearhead Range, a subrange of the Garibaldi Ranges of the Pacific Ranges of the Coast Mountains in British Columbia

== Literature ==
- Spearhead (Davis novel), a 1958 novel by Franklin M. Davis, Jr.
- Spearhead (Makos novel), a 2019 novel by Adam Makos
- Spearhead (G.I. Joe), a fictional character in the G.I. Joe universe

== Music ==
- Spearhead (band), a musical group founded by Michael Franti
- Spearhead (album), an album by British death metal band Bolt Thrower

== Politics ==
- Melanesian Spearhead Group, a forum of south Pacific island nations
- Spearhead (magazine), a British far-right magazine

== Other ==
- Spearhead (video game), a 1998 computer game by Zombie Studios
- Chlorocrambe hastata, a species of plant in the family Brassicaceae
- Spearhead, a division of the video game company Electronic Arts
- Senecio tropaeolifolius, a species in the daisy family which is known as "nasturtium-leaf spearhead"
