= Mount Trorey =

Mountain in the country of Canada

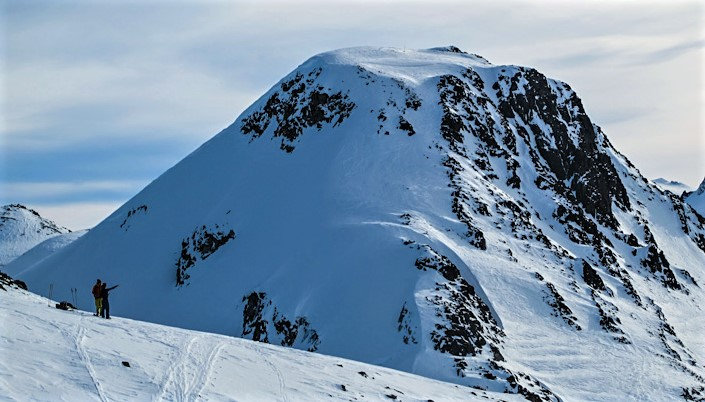
- Northwest aspect

Highest point
- Elevation: 2,461 m (8,074 ft)
- Prominence: 111 m (364 ft)
- Parent peak: Mount Pattison (2,483 m)
- Isolation: 0.88 km (0.55 mi)
- Listing: Mountains of British Columbia
- Coordinates: 50°03′35″N 122°50′23″W

Geography
- Location within British Columbia Location within Canada
- Interactive map of Mount Trorey
- Location: Garibaldi Provincial Park; British Columbia, Canada
- District: New Westminster Land District
- Parent range: Spearhead Range; Garibaldi Ranges; Coast Ranges
- Topo map: NTS 92J2 Whistler

Climbing
- First ascent: 1928

Mount Trorey is a 2,461-metre (8,074-foot) mountain summit located in British Columbia, Canada.

== Description ==
Mount Trorey is set within Garibaldi Provincial Park. It is part of the Spearhead Range, which is a subset of the Garibaldi Ranges of the Coast Mountains. It is situated 12 km (7 mi) east-southeast of Whistler and 2 km (1 mi) west of Tremor Mountain, which is the highest point in the Spearhead Range. Precipitation runoff from the south side of the peak drains to Fitzsimmons Creek which is a tributary of the Cheakamus River, and meltwater from the Trorey Glacier on the northeastern slope drains into headwaters of Wedge Creek. Topographic relief is significant as the summit rises 1,160 meters (3,800 feet) above Fitzsimmons Creek in 1.5 kilometer (0.9 mile). Mount Trorey is often climbed as part of the Spearhead Traverse.

== History ==
The name "Trorey Mountain" was adopted September 2, 1930, as recommended by the Garibaldi Park Board. The toponym was officially changed to "Mount Trorey" on December 31, 1966, by the Geographical Names Board of Canada.

The mountain is named after James John Trorey (1858–1941), a founding member of the Vancouver Mountaineering Club in 1907 (now known as the British Columbia Mountaineering Club). He was also a member of the team which made the first ascent of Mount Garibaldi on August 11, 1907.

The first ascent of Mt. Trorey was made in 1928 by a B.C. Garibaldi Survey party.

== Climate ==
Based on the Köppen climate classification, Mount Trorey is located in the marine west coast climate zone of western North America. Most weather fronts originate in the Pacific Ocean, and travel east toward the Coast Mountains where they are forced upward by the range (Orographic lift), causing them to drop their moisture in the form of rain or snowfall. As a result, the Coast Mountains experience high precipitation, especially during the winter months in the form of snowfall. Winter temperatures can drop below −20 °C with wind chill factors below −30 °C. This climate supports the Trorey Glacier on the northeast slope of this mountain and the nearby Whistler Blackcomb ski resort.

== Gallery ==
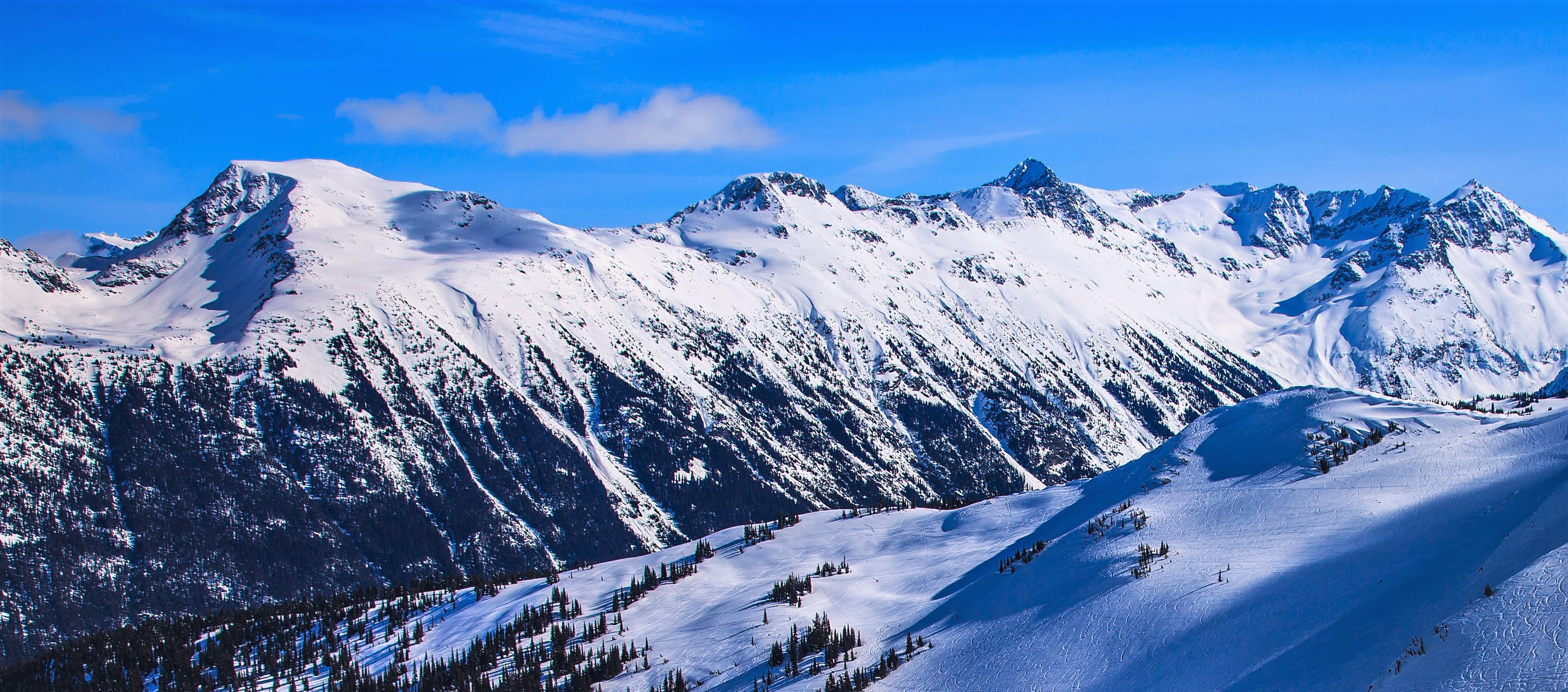
Decker Mountain (left), Mount Trorey (center), Tremor Mountain (right of center), and Mount Macbeth (right edge) seen from Whistler ski slopes

== See also ==
- Geography of British Columbia
