= Phalanx Mountain =

Summit in Garibaldi Provincial Park of British Columbia, Canada

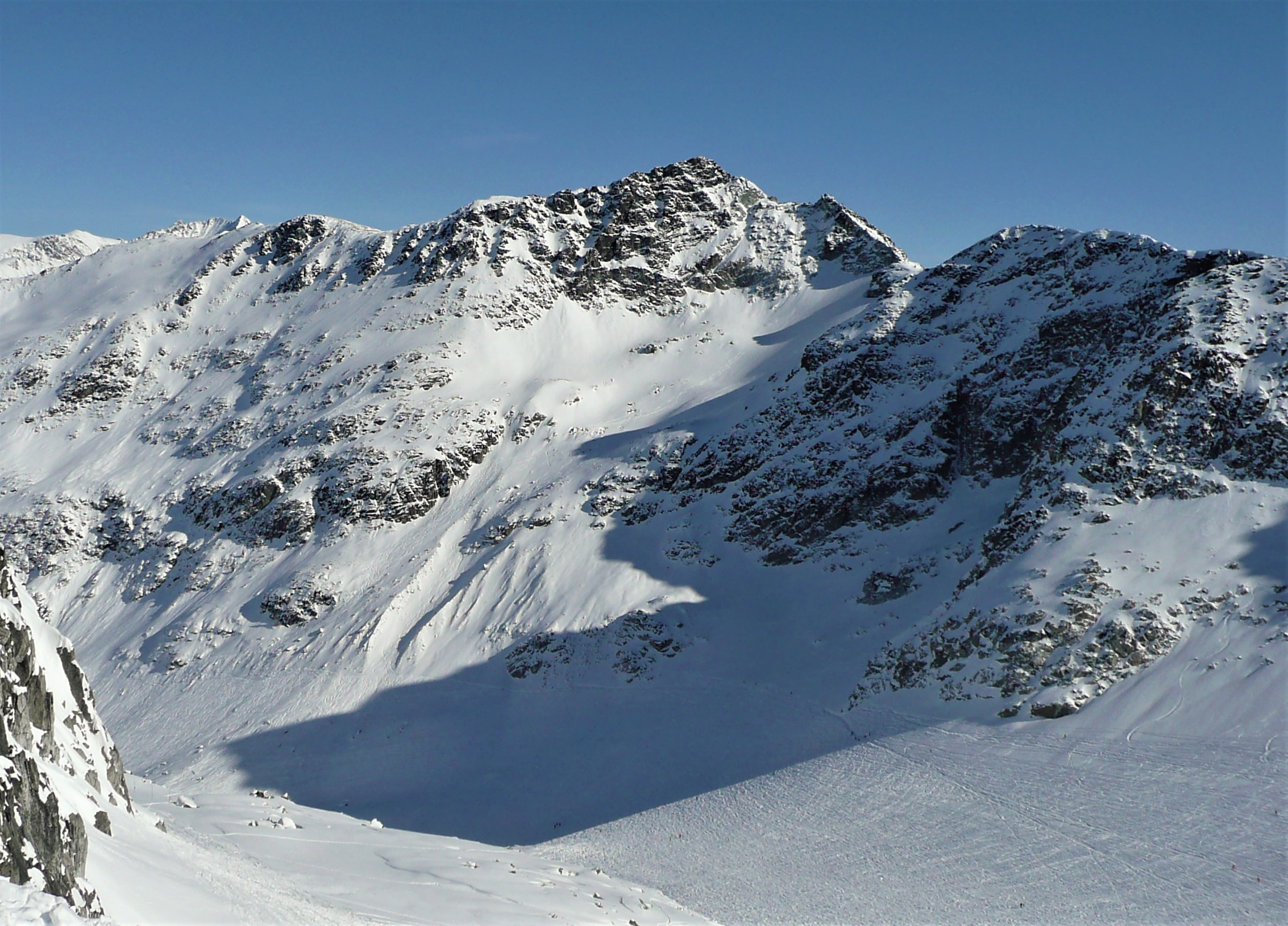
- Southwest aspect

Highest point
- Elevation: 2,441 m (8,009 ft)
- Prominence: 151 m (495 ft)
- Parent peak: The Spearhead (2,457 m)
- Isolation: 1.38 km (0.86 mi)
- Listing: Mountains of British Columbia
- Coordinates: 50°05′53″N 122°51′30″W

Naming
- Etymology: Phalanx

Geography
- Location within British Columbia Location within Canada
- Interactive map of Phalanx Mountain
- Country: Canada
- Province: British Columbia
- District: New Westminster Land District
- Protected area: Garibaldi Provincial Park
- Parent range: Spearhead Range; Garibaldi Ranges; Coast Mountains
- Topo map: NTS 92J2 Whistler

Phalanx Mountain is a 2,441-metre (8,009-foot) summit located in Garibaldi Provincial Park of southwest British Columbia, Canada.

== Description ==
Phalanx Mountain is the northernmost peak in the Spearhead Range, which is a subset of the Garibaldi Ranges of the Coast Mountains. The peak is situated 7 km (4 mi) east-southeast of Whistler and 1.4 km (1 mi) north-northeast of The Spearhead, which is the nearest higher neighbor. Precipitation runoff and glacial meltwater from the east side of the peak drains to Wedge Creek, whereas the west slope drains to Blackcomb Creek, with both then eventually finding the Green River. Phalanx is more notable for its steep rise above local terrain than for its absolute elevation as topographic relief is significant with the summit rising 1,240 meters (4,068 ft) above Wedge Creek in approximately 3 km (1.9 mi).

== Etymology ==
The descriptive name for the mountain refers to the mountain resembling a Greek flying wedge of soldiers when viewed from the southwest or southeast, and this wedge formation is termed a phalanx. The mountain's toponym was officially adopted August 27, 1965, by the Geographical Names Board of Canada.

== Climate ==
Based on the Köppen climate classification, Phalanx Mountain is located in the marine west coast climate zone of western North America. Most weather fronts originate in the Pacific Ocean, and travel east toward the Coast Mountains where they are forced upward by the range (Orographic lift), causing them to drop their moisture in the form of rain or snowfall. As a result, the Coast Mountains experience high precipitation, especially during the winter months in the form of snowfall. Winter temperatures can drop below −20 °C with wind chill factors below −30 °C. This climate supports the Blackcomb Glacier below the west slope, Spearhead Glacier on the southeast slope, and the Phalanx Glacier on the north slope. The months July through September offer the most favorable weather for climbing Phalanx Mountain.

== Gallery ==
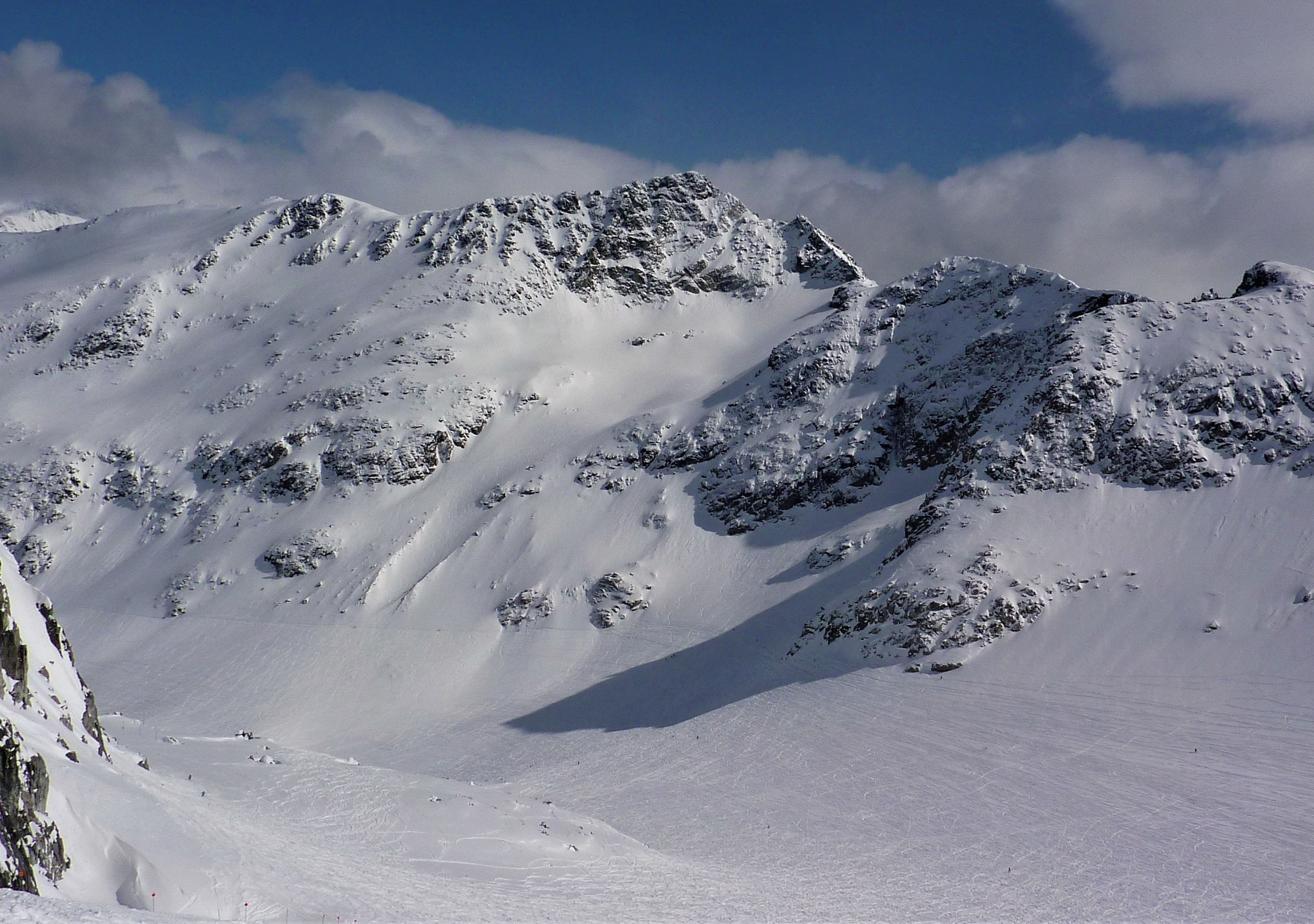
Southwest aspect

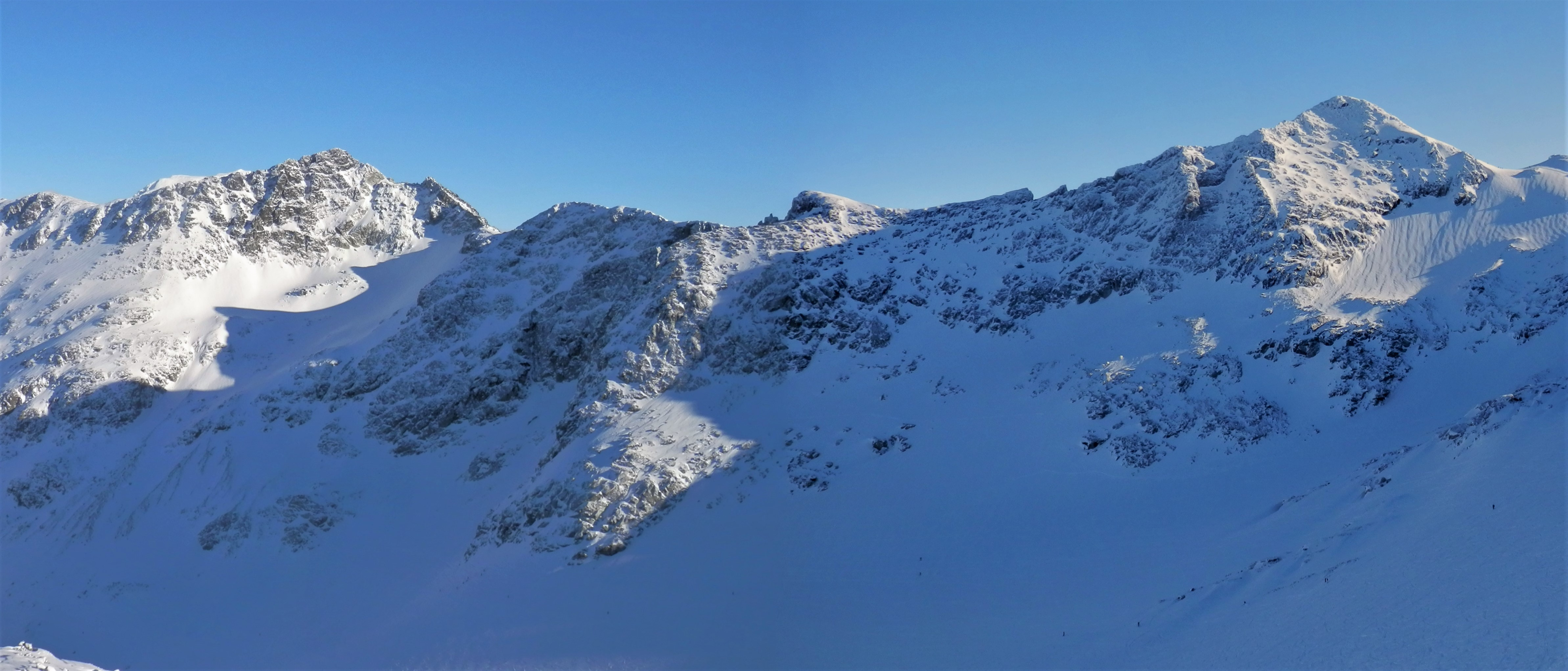
Phalanx Mountain (left) and line parent The Spearhead (right) from the west near Blackcomb ski area

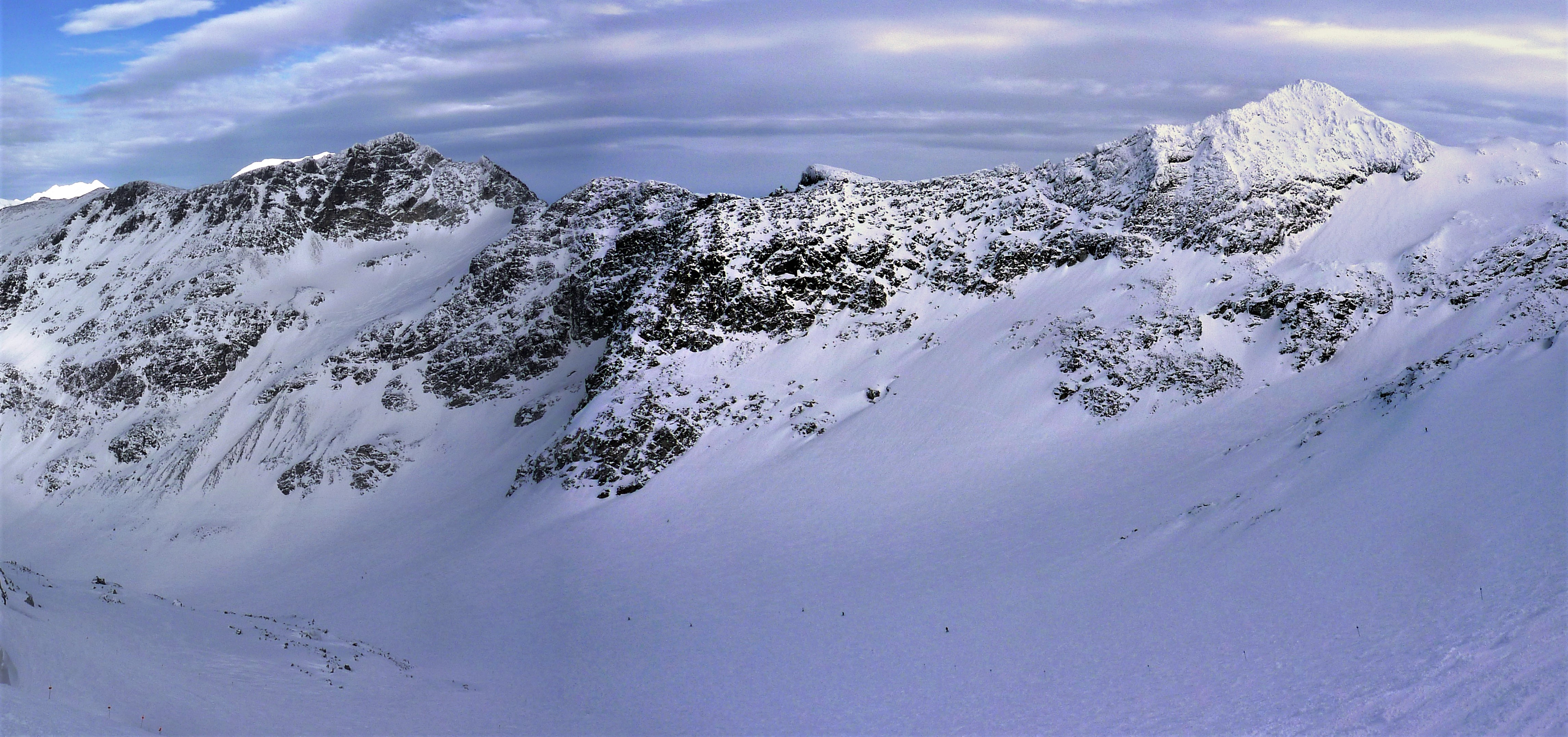
Phalanx Mountain (left) and The Spearhead (right) from the west at Blackcomb ski area

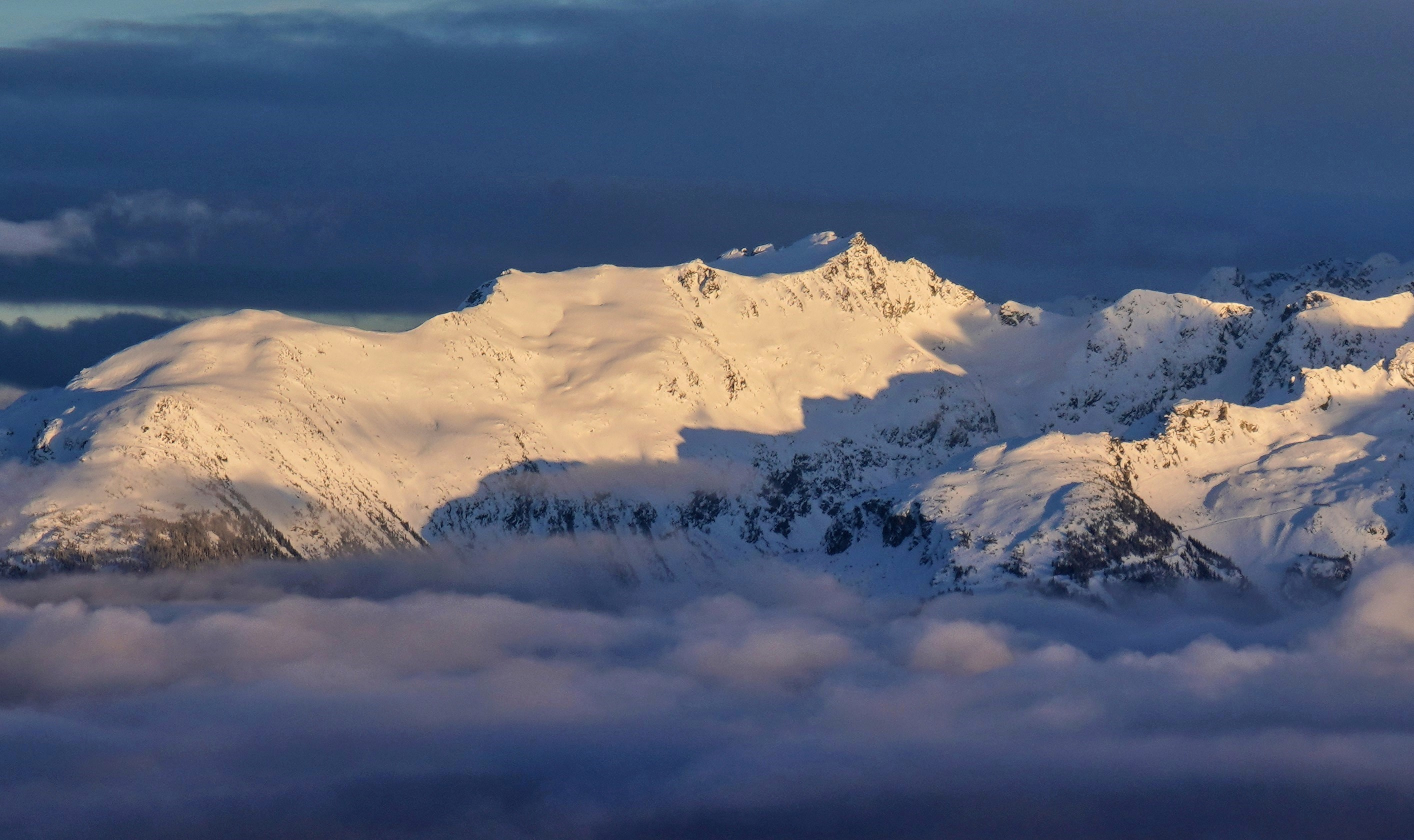
Winter sunset on Phalanx Mountain seen from Rainbow Mountain

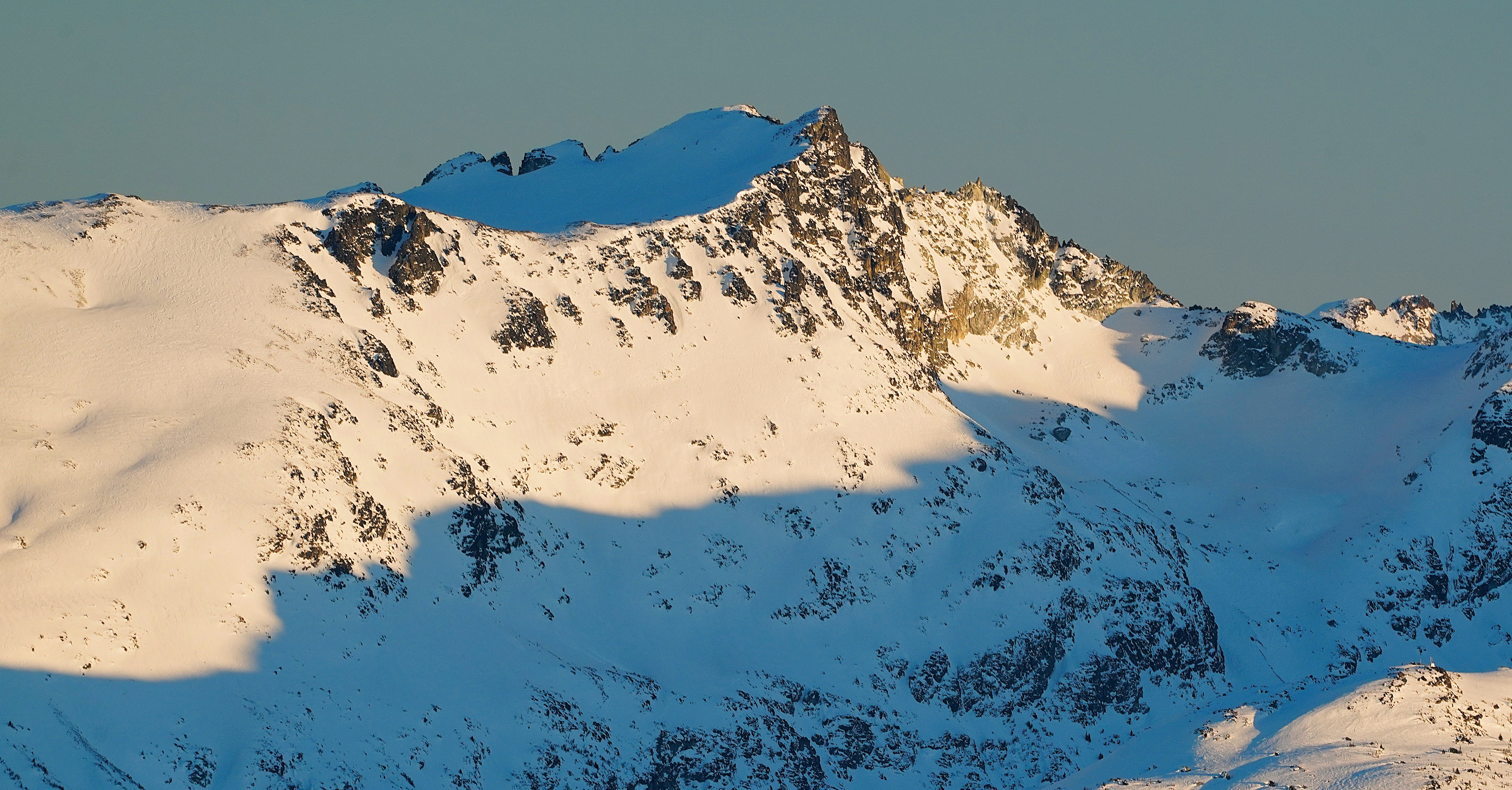
Northwest aspect of Phalanx Mountain seen from Rainbow Mountain

== See also ==
- Geography of British Columbia
- Geology of British Columbia
