= Shudder Mountain =

Mountain in British Columbia, Canada

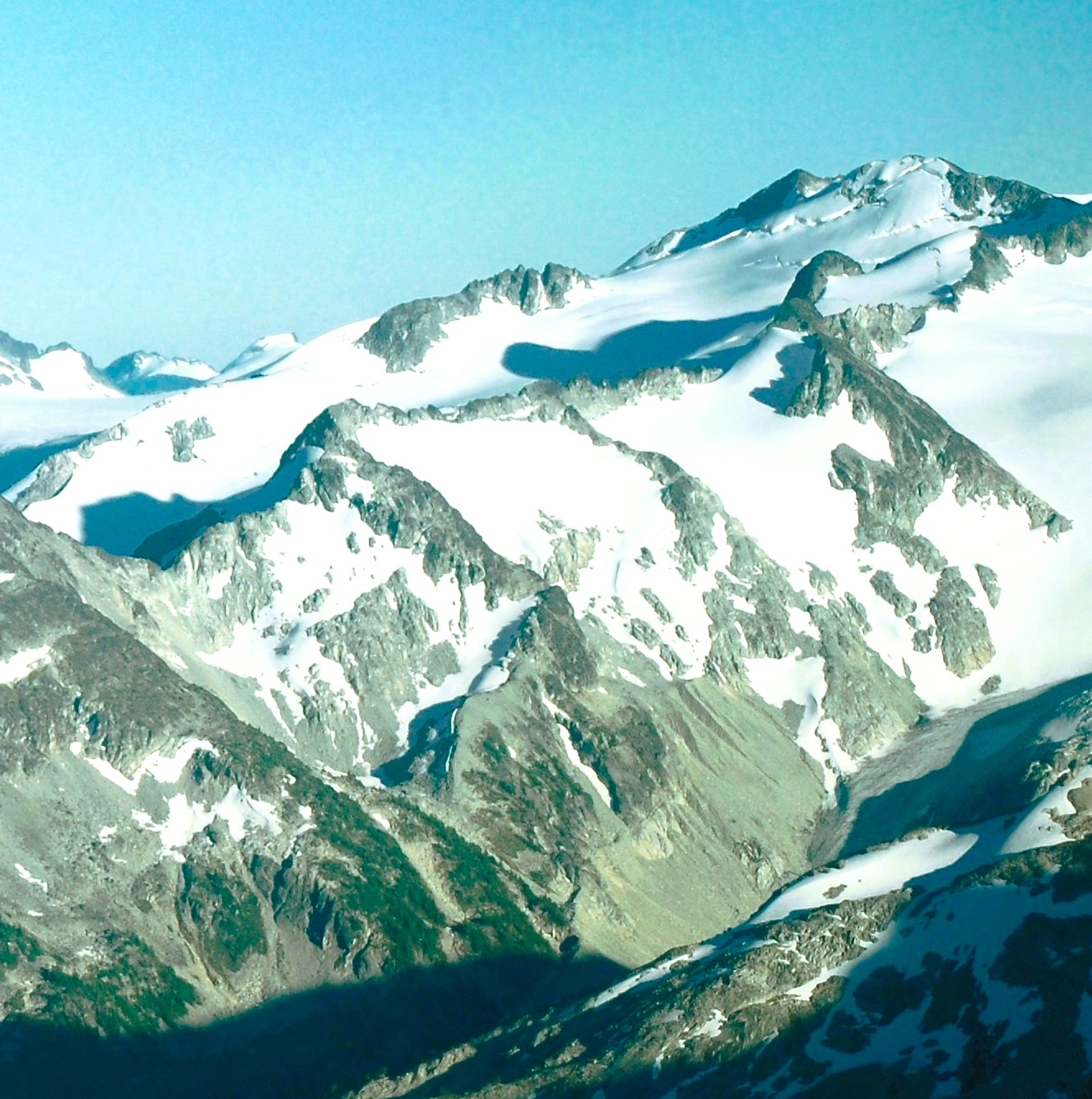
- Northwest aspect

Highest point
- Elevation: 2,671 m (8,763 ft)
- Prominence: 81 m (266 ft)
- Parent peak: Tremor Mountain
- Isolation: 0.68 km (0.42 mi)
- Listing: Mountains of British Columbia
- Coordinates: 50°03′21″N 122°47′42″W

Naming
- Etymology: Shudder

Geography
- Location within British Columbia Location within Canada
- Interactive map of Shudder Mountain
- Country: Canada
- Province: British Columbia
- District: New Westminster Land District
- Protected area: Garibaldi Provincial Park
- Parent range: Spearhead Range; Garibaldi Ranges; Coast Mountains
- Topo map: NTS 92J2 Whistler

Shudder Mountain is a 2,671-metre (8,763-foot) summit in British Columbia, Canada.

== Description ==
Shudder Mountain is the third-highest peak in the Spearhead Range which is a subrange of the Garibaldi Ranges of the Coast Mountains. The glaciated peak is located 15 km (9 mi) southeast of Whistler in Garibaldi Provincial Park, and 0.68 km (0.42 mi) east of Tremor Mountain which is the nearest higher neighbor. Precipitation runoff from the south side of the peak as well as meltwater from the Platform Glacier drains into headwaters of Fitzsimmons Creek which is a tributary of the Green River. Meltwater from the Shudder Glacier on the north slope and Shatter Glacier on the east slope drains to Lillooet River via Billygoat Creek. Topographic relief is significant as the summit rises 1,170 metres (3,838 ft) above Fitzsimmons Creek in three kilometres (1.9 mi). The mountain was named in association with Tremor Mountain as submitted in 1964 by Dick Culbert, and the toponym was officially adopted on August 27, 1965, by the Geographical Names Board of Canada. Tremor Mountain's name origin refers to unexplained earth tremors when the first ascent party was on the summit.

== Climate ==
Based on the Köppen climate classification, Shudder Mountain is located in the marine west coast climate zone of western North America. Most weather fronts originate in the Pacific Ocean] and travel east toward the Coast Mountains where they are forced upward by the range (orographic lift), causing them to drop their moisture in the form of rain or snowfall. As a result, the Coast Mountains experience high precipitation, especially during the winter months in the form of snowfall. Winter temperatures can drop below −20 °C with wind chill factors below −30 °C. This climate supports the Tremor, Shudder, Shatter, and Platform glaciers surrounding the peak. The months of July and August offer the most favorable weather for climbing Shudder Mountain.

== See also ==
- Geography of British Columbia
- Geology of British Columbia
