= Decker Mountain =

Mountain in the country of Canada

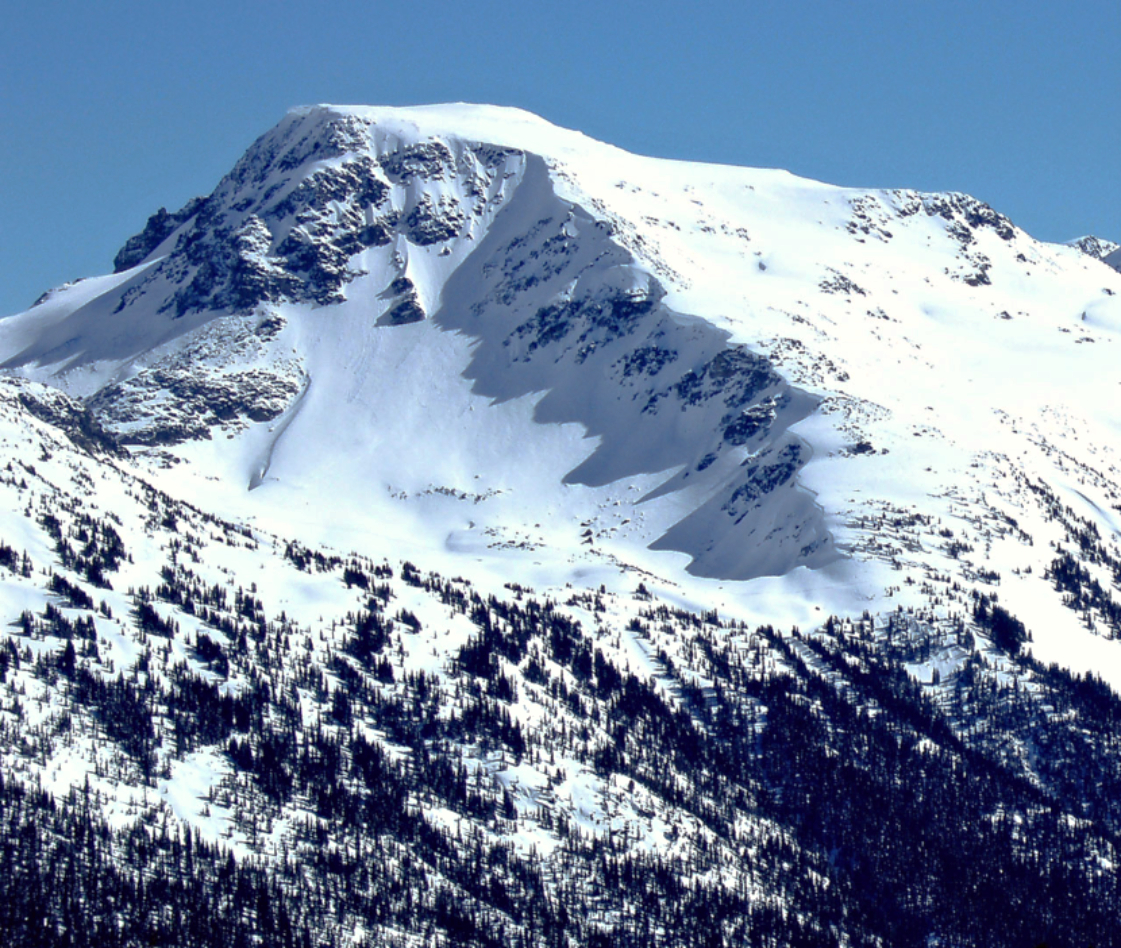
- Decker Mountain as seen from the Whistler Mountain ski area

Highest point
- Elevation: 2,421 m (7,943 ft)
- Prominence: 158 m (518 ft)
- Parent peak: Mount Trorey
- Listing: Mountains of British Columbia
- Coordinates: 50°04′10″N 122°51′15″W

Geography
- Location within British Columbia Location within Canada
- Interactive map of Decker Mountain
- Location: Garibaldi Provincial Park; British Columbia, Canada
- District: New Westminster Land District
- Parent range: Spearhead Range; Garibaldi Ranges; Coast Ranges
- Topo map: NTS 92J2 Whistler

Climbing
- First ascent: 1954 VOC party
- Easiest route: Eastern slope

Decker Mountain is a 2,421-metre (7,943-foot) flat-topped peak located in the Garibaldi Ranges of the Coast Mountains, in Garibaldi Provincial Park of southwestern British Columbia, Canada. It is part of the Spearhead Range, which is a subset of the Garibaldi Ranges. It is situated 9 km (6 mi) southeast of Whistler, and 3.9 km (2 mi) west-northwest of Tremor Mountain, which is the highest point in the Spearhead Range. Precipitation runoff from the south side of the peak drains into Fitzsimmons Creek which is a tributary of the Cheakamus River, and meltwater from the Decker Glacier on the northeastern slope drains to Wedge Creek.

Decker Mountain is often climbed as part of the Spearhead Traverse. The first ascent of the mountain was made in 1954 by a party from the Varsity Outdoor Club of the University of British Columbia. The descriptive name for the mountain refers to its two-decked layer form and flat, deck-like top, while the suffix "er" was used for purposes of euphony. The mountain's name was officially adopted on August 27, 1965, by the Geographical Names Board of Canada as submitted by Dick Culbert, author of Climber's Guide to the Coastal Ranges of British Columbia.

== Climate ==
Based on the Köppen climate classification, Decker Mountain is located in the marine west coast climate zone of western North America. Most weather fronts originate in the Pacific Ocean, and travel east toward the Coast Mountains where they are forced upward by the range (Orographic lift), causing them to drop their moisture in the form of rain or snowfall. As a result, the Coast Mountains experience high precipitation, especially during the winter months in the form of snowfall. Winter temperatures can drop below −20 °C with wind chill factors below −30 °C. The months July through September offer the most favorable weather for climbing Decker Mountain.

== Climbing routes ==
Established climbing routes on Decker Mountain:

- East Side
- Southwest Face
- Northwest Face
- Decker Glacier

== Gallery ==
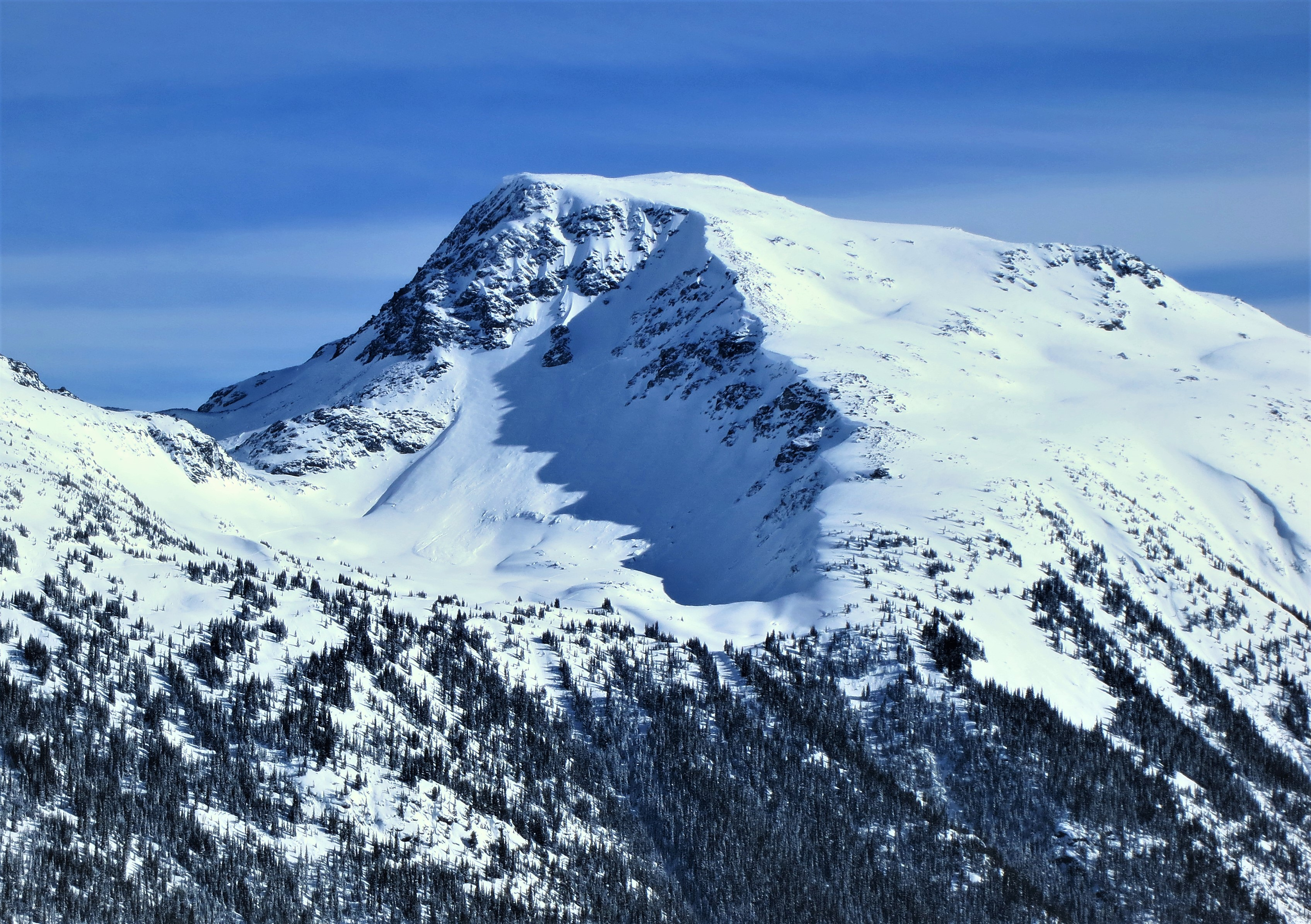
Decker Mountain from Whistler Mountain ski area

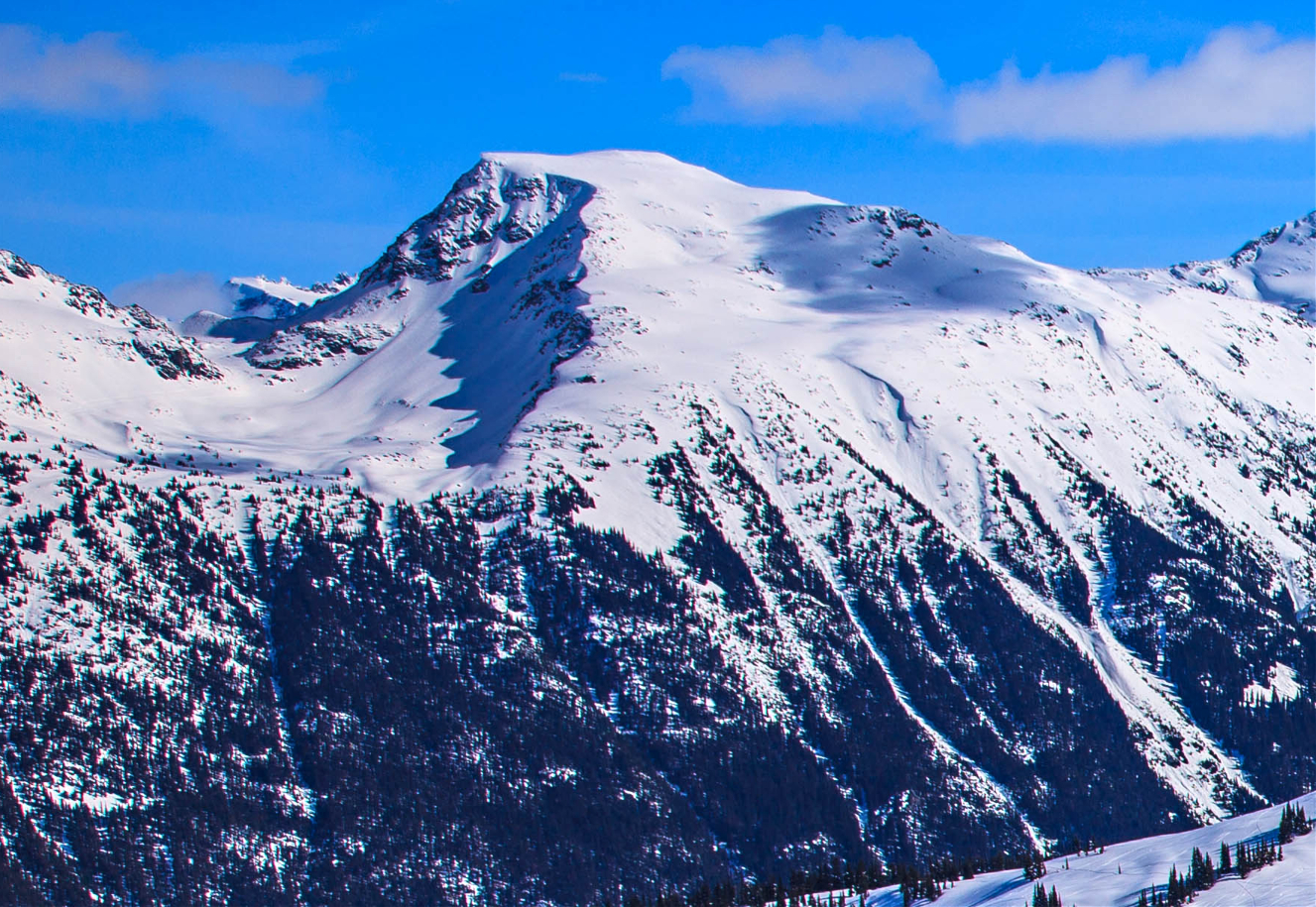
Decker Mountain from Whistler Mountain ski area

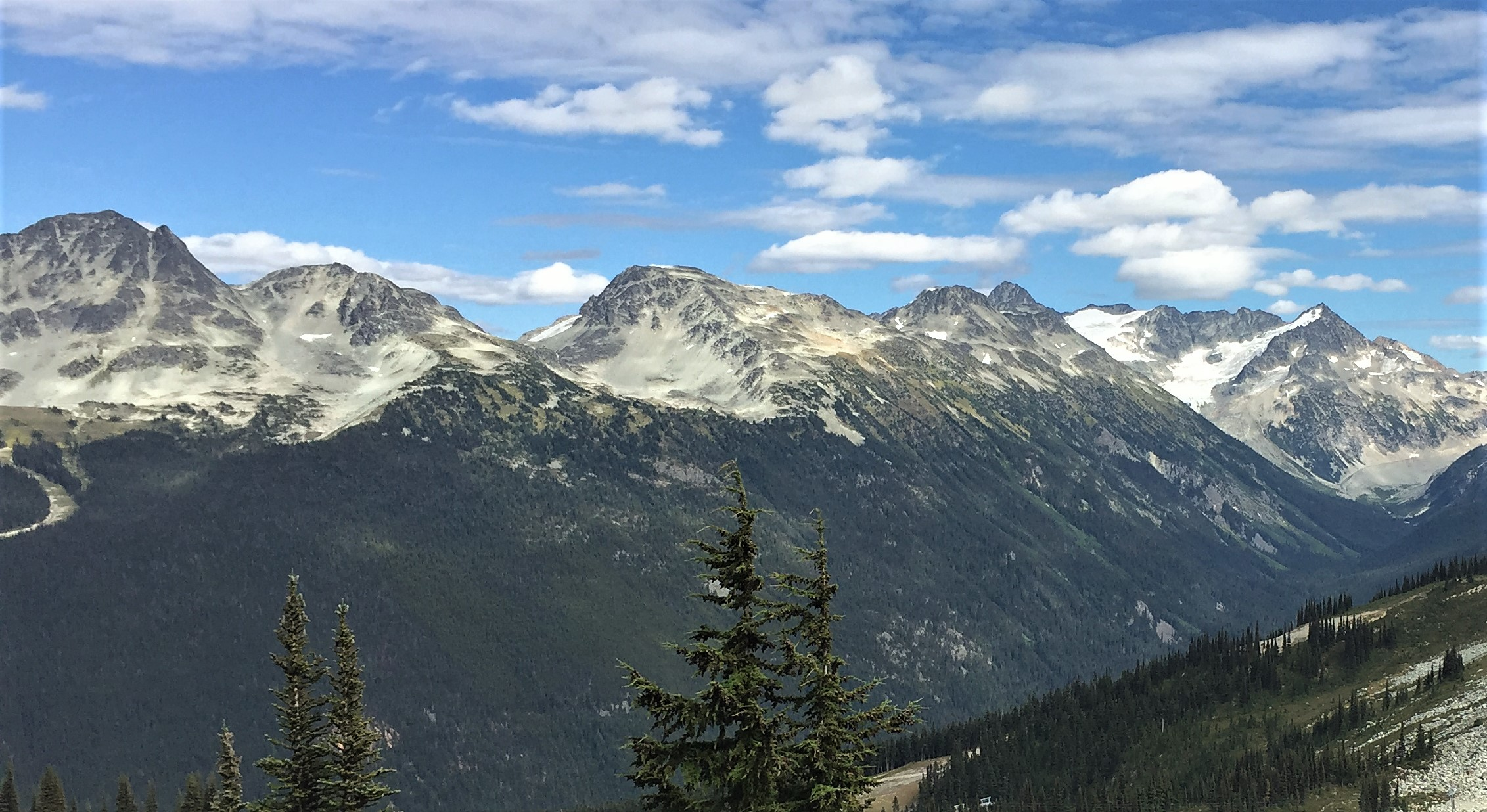
Decker Mountain (center) of the Spearhead Range

== See also ==
- Geography of British Columbia
- Geology of British Columbia
