= Blackcomb =

Blackcomb may refer to:

- Blackcomb Peak, a mountain in British Columbia
- Whistler Blackcomb ski resort
  - Blackcomb Village, a ski village inside the ski resort
- Blackcomb Glacier Provincial Park
- Windows Blackcomb, a canceled version of Microsoft Windows
- Black Combe, a fell in the Lake District of England
