= The Spearhead =

Peak in the Garibaldi Ranges of British Columbia, Canada

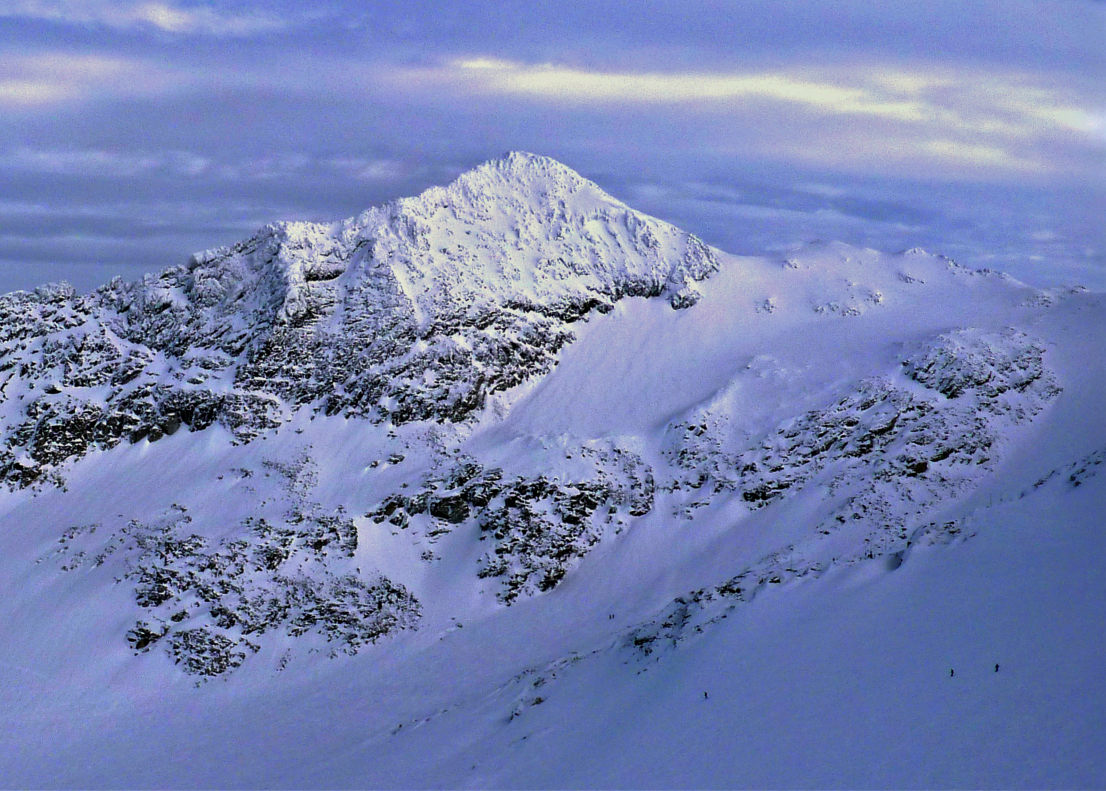
- The Spearhead, west aspect

Highest point
- Elevation: 2,457 m (8,061 ft)
- Prominence: 307 m (1,007 ft)
- Parent peak: Tremor Mountain
- Coordinates: 50°05′11″N 122°51′50″W

Geography
- Location within British Columbia Location within Canada
- Interactive map of The Spearhead
- Location: Garibaldi Provincial Park; British Columbia, Canada
- District: New Westminster Land District
- Parent range: Spearhead Range; Garibaldi Ranges; Coast Ranges
- Topo map: NTS 92J2 Whistler

Climbing
- First ascent: 1964 A. MacDonald, B. Port, Karl Ricker
- Easiest route: Southwest Ridge

The Spearhead is a 2,457 m (8,061 ft) peak in the Garibaldi Ranges of British Columbia, Canada, and is one of the main summits of the Blackcomb Mountain portion of the Whistler Blackcomb ski resort, located at the apex of the Blackcomb and Spearhead Glaciers, which is named for it. It also is the namesake of the Spearhead Range, which is the short range flanking the north side of Fitzsimmons Creek and ending on its northwest end at Blackcomb Mountain. The mountain's name was officially adopted on August 27, 1965, by the Geographical Names Board of Canada.

== Climate ==
Based on the Köppen climate classification, The Spearhead is located in the marine west coast climate zone of western North America. Most weather fronts originate in the Pacific Ocean, and travel east toward the Coast Mountains where they are forced upward by the range (orographic lift), causing them to drop their moisture in the form of rain or snowfall. As a result, the Coast Mountains experience high precipitation, especially during the winter months in the form of snowfall. Winter temperatures can drop below −20 °C with wind chill factors below −30 °C. The months July through September offer the most favorable weather for climbing The Spearhead.

== Gallery ==
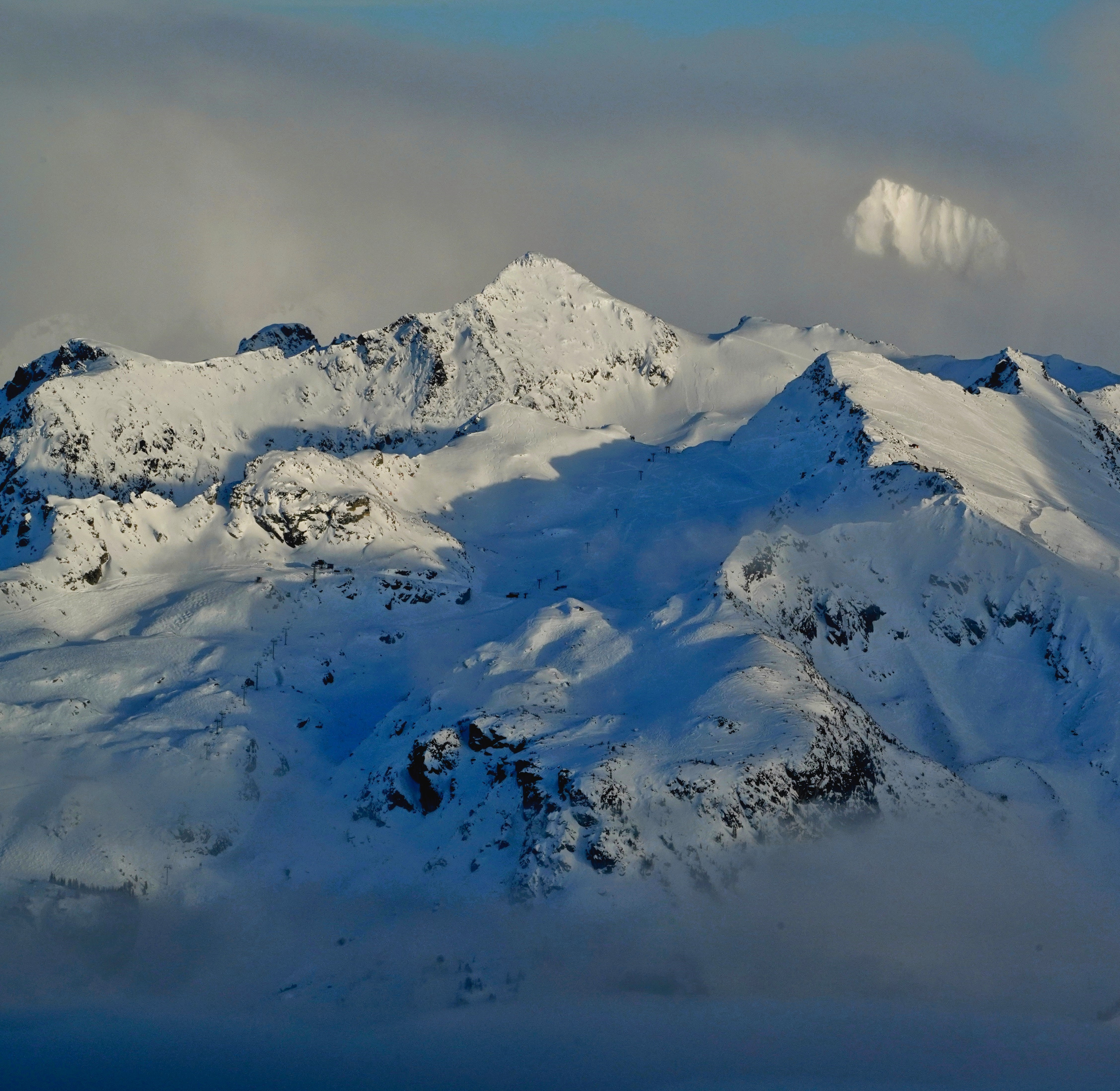
The Spearhead (center) and Tremor Mountain (floating in cloud)

== See also ==
- List of mountains of Canada
- Geography of British Columbia
- Geology of British Columbia
