= Mount Macbeth =

Mountain in British Columbia, Canada

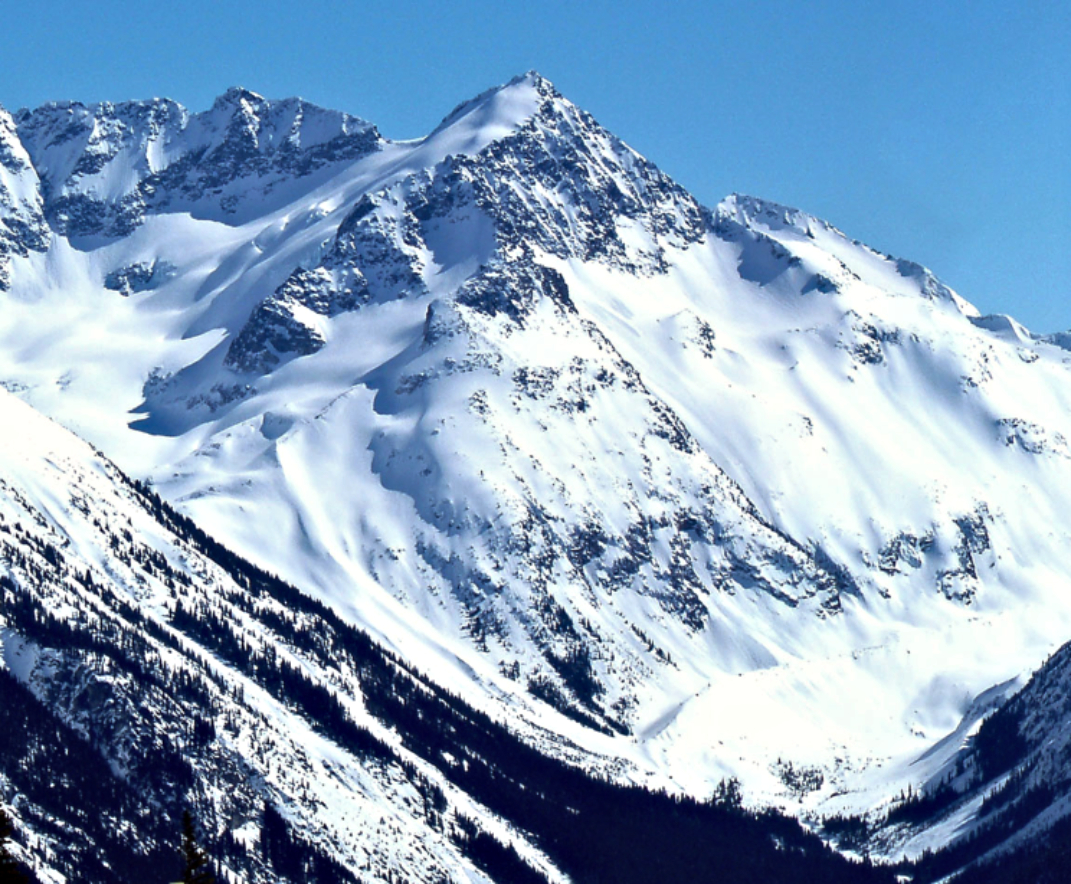
- Mount Macbeth seen from Whistler Mountain

Highest point
- Elevation: 2,639 m (8,658 ft)
- Prominence: 109 m (358 ft)
- Listing: Mountains of British Columbia
- Coordinates: 50°02′16″N 122°47′49″W

Geography
- Location within British Columbia Location within Canada
- Interactive map of Mount Macbeth
- Country: Canada
- Province: British Columbia
- District: New Westminster Land District
- Protected area: Garibaldi Provincial Park
- Parent range: Spearhead Range; Garibaldi Ranges; Coast Ranges
- Topo map: NTS 92J2 Whistler

Climbing
- First ascent: 1969 by P. Starr, E. Bass, B. Ellis, P. Macec

Mount Macbeth is a 2,639-metre (8,658-foot) glacier-clad peak located in the Garibaldi Ranges of the Coast Mountains, in Garibaldi Provincial Park of southwestern British Columbia, Canada. It is part of the Spearhead Range, which is a subset of the Garibaldi Ranges. It is situated 14 km (9 mi) southeast of Whistler, and 2 km (1 mi) south of Tremor Mountain, which is the highest point in the Spearhead Range. The Naden Glacier spreads out below the eastern aspect of the summit, the Macbeth Glacier lies below the south aspect, and the Curtain Glacier descends the northern slope. Precipitation runoff from the peak and meltwater from its glaciers drains into Fitzsimmons Creek which is a tributary of the Cheakamus River. Macbeth is most often climbed as part of the Spearhead Traverse. The first ascent of the mountain was made in 1969 by P. Starr, E. Bass, B. Ellis, and P. Macec via the northeast ridge. The peak was named in 1964 by an Alpine Club of Canada climbing party, to commemorate the 400th anniversary of William Shakespeare's birth. The mountain's name was officially adopted on August 27, 1965, by the Geographical Names Board of Canada.

== Climate ==
Based on the Köppen climate classification, Mount Macbeth is located in the marine west coast climate zone of western North America. Most weather fronts originate in the Pacific Ocean, and travel east toward the Coast Mountains where they are forced upward by the range (Orographic lift), causing them to drop their moisture in the form of rain or snowfall. As a result, the Coast Mountains experience high precipitation, especially during the winter months in the form of snowfall. Winter temperatures can drop below −20 °C with wind chill factors below −30 °C. The months July through September offer the most favorable weather for climbing Mount Macbeth.

== Climbing Routes ==
Established climbing routes on Mount Macbeth:

- Northeast Ridge - class 4 First Ascent 1969
- East Side - standard route on snow
- Southwest Face
- South Face

== Gallery ==
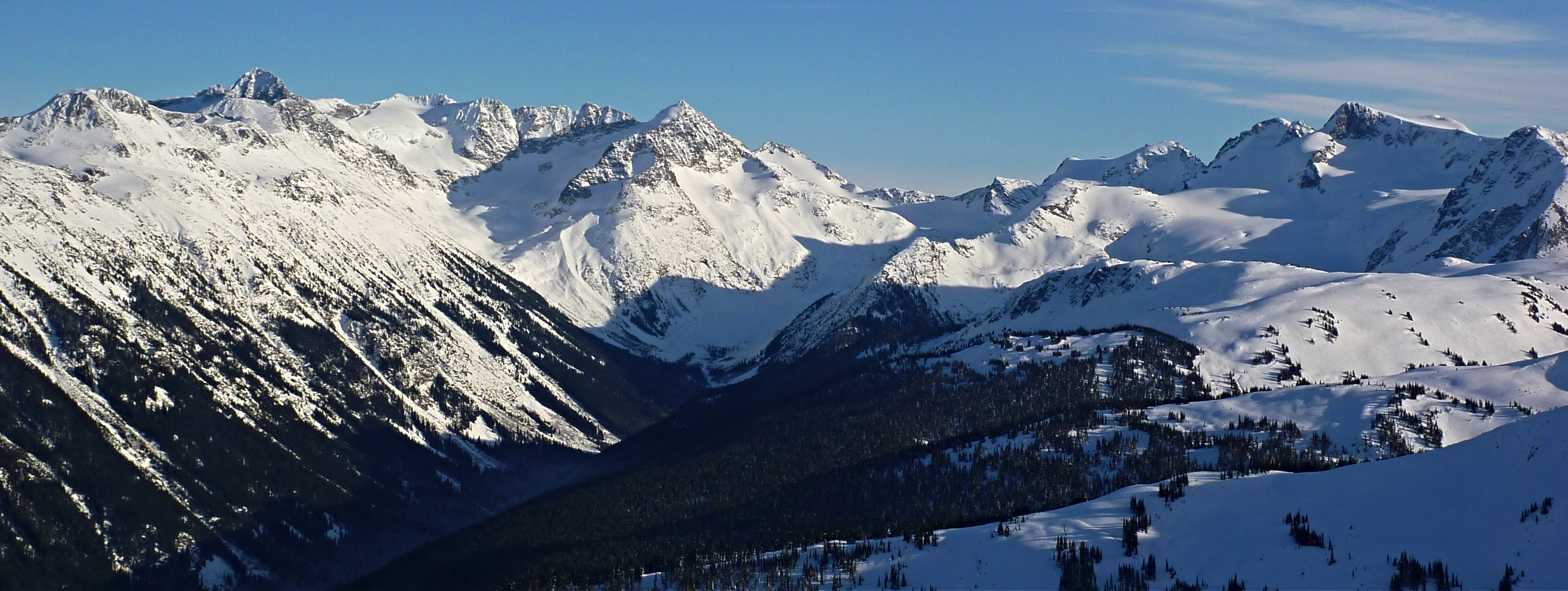
Macbeth centered, with Tremor Mountain to left, and Overlord Mountain to right

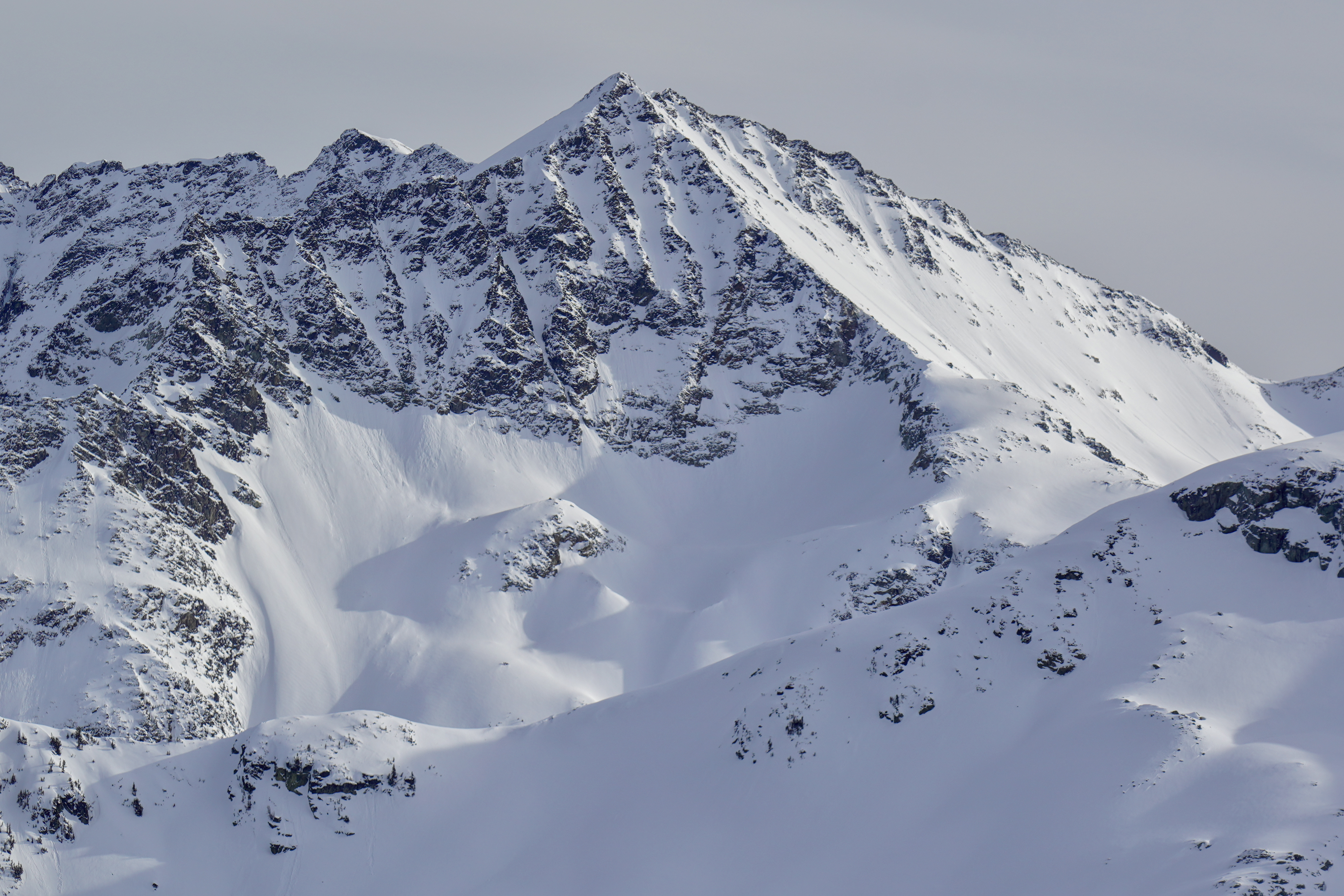
Southwest aspect

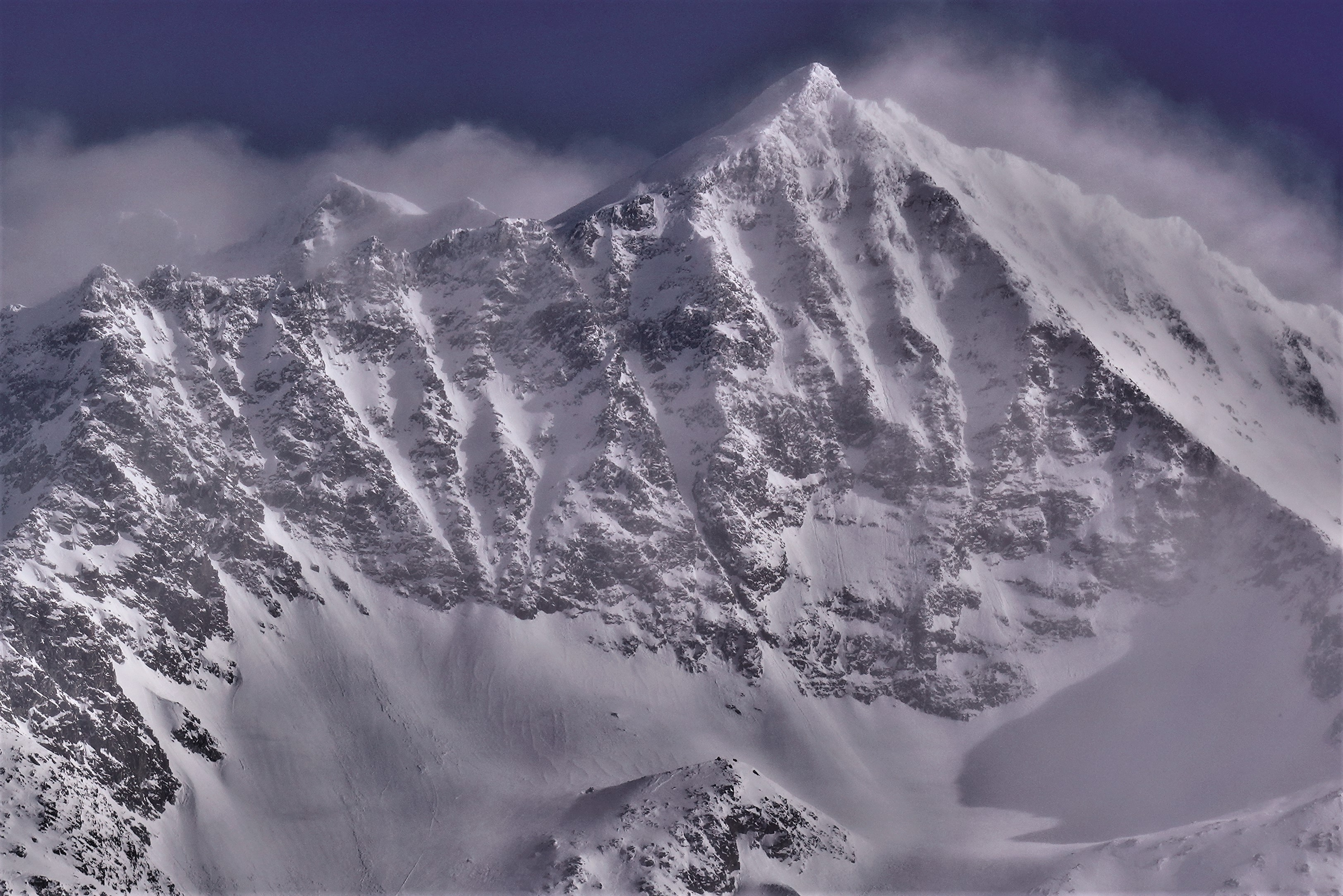
Mount Macbeth in winter

== See also ==
- Geography of British Columbia
- Geology of British Columbia
