= Spearhead Range =

Subrange of the Garibaldi Ranges of British Columbia, Canada

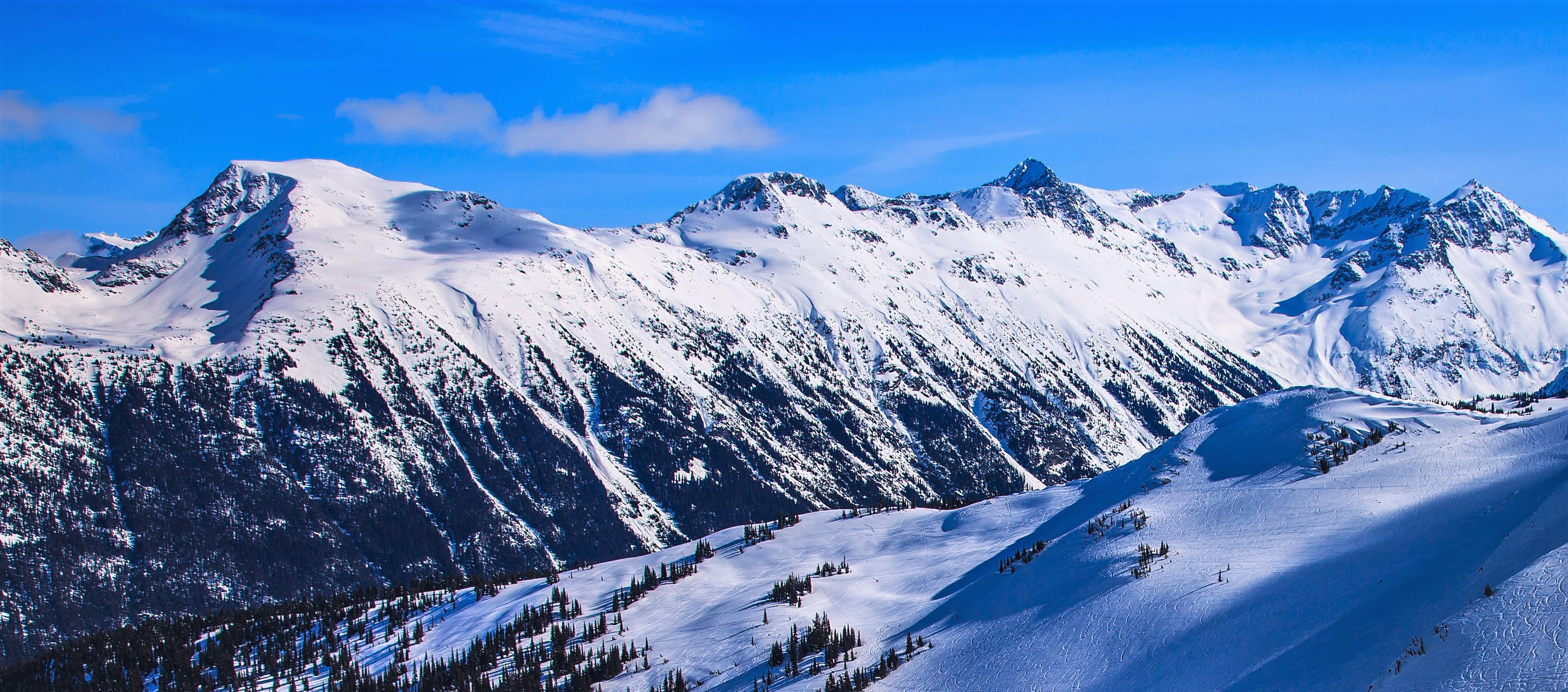
- Decker Mountain (left), Mount Trorey (center), Tremor Mountain (right of center) seen from ski slopes of Whistler Mountain in British Columbia, Canada

Highest point
- Peak: Tremor Mountain
- Elevation: 2,691 m (8,829 ft)
- Coordinates: 50°03′19″N 122°48′17″W

Dimensions
- Area: 83 km^{2} (32 mi^{2})

Geography
- Location within British Columbia
- Country: Canada
- Province: British Columbia
- Range coordinates: 50°03′59″N 122°50′04″W
- Parent range: Garibaldi Ranges

The Spearhead Range is a short subrange of the Garibaldi Ranges of southwestern British Columbia, Canada, adjacent to the resort town of Whistler, British Columbia and ending at its northwestern apex in Blackcomb Mountain, one of two mountains forming the Whistler Blackcomb ski resort. Other notable summits are Tremor Mountain (highest point of the range), The Spearhead, Mount Macbeth, Decker Mountain, Mount Trorey, Phalanx Mountain and Shatter, Shudder, Quiver and other similarly named peaks and glaciers. The range was named in 1923 by Don and Phyllis Munday as the range's peaks resembled spearheads rising from the alpine fog.

To the north of the range is Lone Goat Pass, formed by Wedge Creek and Lone Goat Creek, which is fed by the Spearhead Glacier, the largest glacier in the range. The valley of Fitzsimmons Creek is on the range's south side, and is the location of the Whistler Sliding Centre, which was built for the 2010 Winter Olympics.

The Spearhead Range's counterpart on the south side of Fitzsimmons Creek is the Fitzsimmons Range, which runs east from Whistler Mountain.
