= Chlorocrambe =

Scientific classification
- Kingdom: Plantae
- Clade: Tracheophytes
- Clade: Angiosperms
- Clade: Eudicots
- Clade: Rosids
- Order: Brassicales
- Family: Brassicaceae
- Genus: Chlorocrambe; Rydb.
- Species: C. hastata

Binomial name
- Chlorocrambe hastata (S.Watson) Rydb.

Synonyms
- Caulanthus hastatus S.Watson; Streptanthus hastatus (S.Watson) M.E.Peck

Genus of flowering plants

Chlorocrambe is a genus of flowering plants belonging to the family Brassicaceae. It includes a single species, Chlorocrambe hastata, a perennial native to Idaho, Oregon, and Utah in the western United States.

The species was first described as Caulanthus hastatus by Sereno Watson in 1871. In 1907 Per Axel Rydberg placed the species in the new monotypic genus Chlorocrambe as Chlorocrambe hastata.
