= Spearhead Glacier =

Glacier in British Columbia, Canada

Coordinates: 50°05′00″N 122°51′00″W

The Spearhead Glacier is the largest glacier on the Spearhead Range, located on the opposite, northeast side of that range from the resort town of Whistler, British Columbia, Canada, and is serviced in part by the lift system of the Whistler Blackcomb ski resort. The glacier's apex is at the peak known as The Spearhead, which also lies at the head of the Blackcomb Glacier.
