= Blackcomb Glacier Provincial Park =

Provincial park in British Columbia, Canada

- IUCN category II (national park)
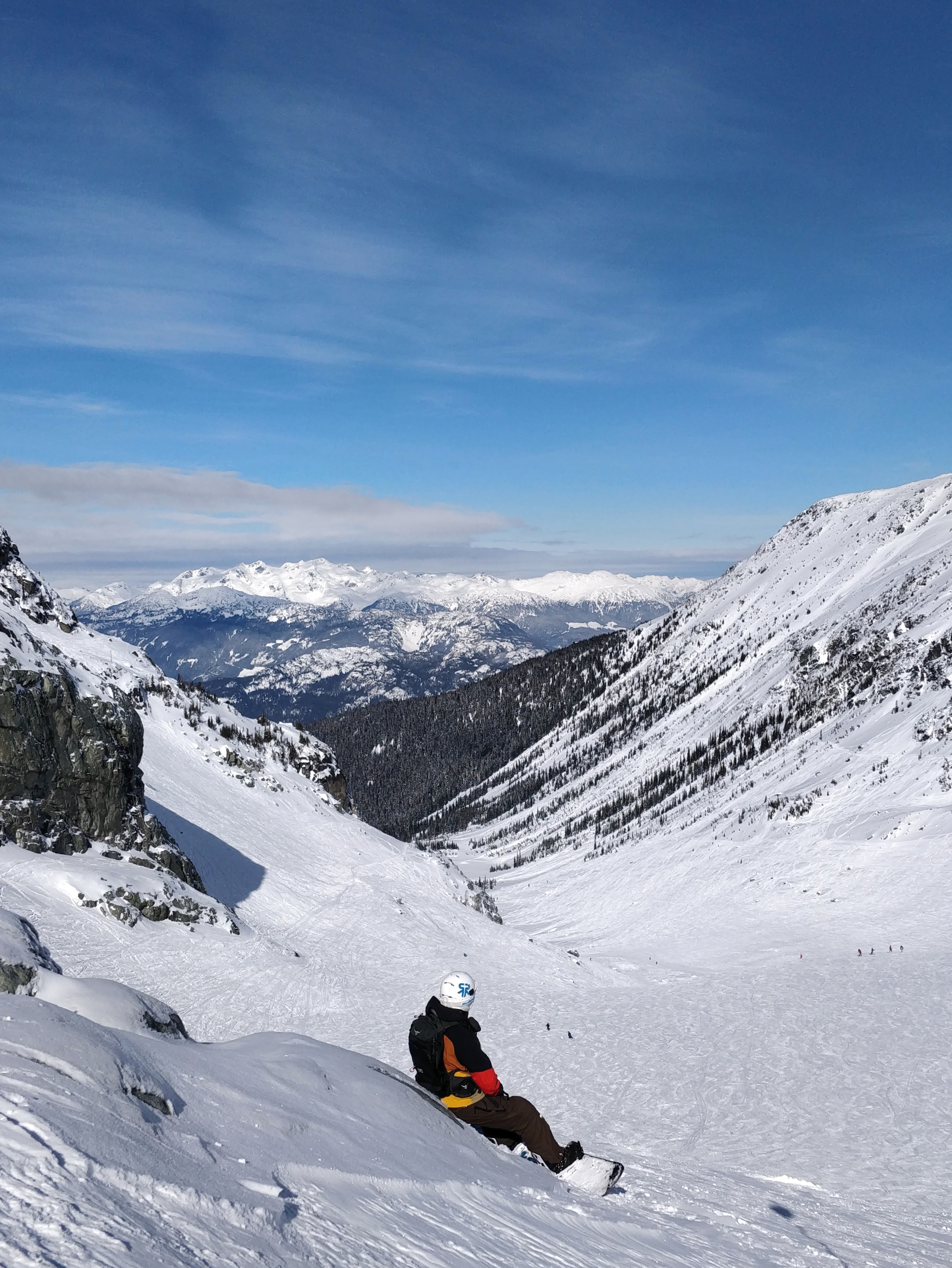

- Location within British Columbia
- Interactive map of Blackcomb Glacier Provincial Park
- Location: New Westminster Land District, British Columbia, Canada
- Nearest city: Whistler, BC
- Coordinates: 50°05′29″N 122°52′15″W
- Area: 221 ha (550 acres)
- Established: August 2, 1990
- Governing body: BC Parks

Blackcomb Glacier Provincial Park is a provincial park in British Columbia, Canada, located just east of and above the resort town of Whistler and adjacent to Garibaldi Provincial Park. The park was established in 1990 on land formerly protected by Garibaldi Park.
