= Tremor Mountain =

Mountain in the country of Canada

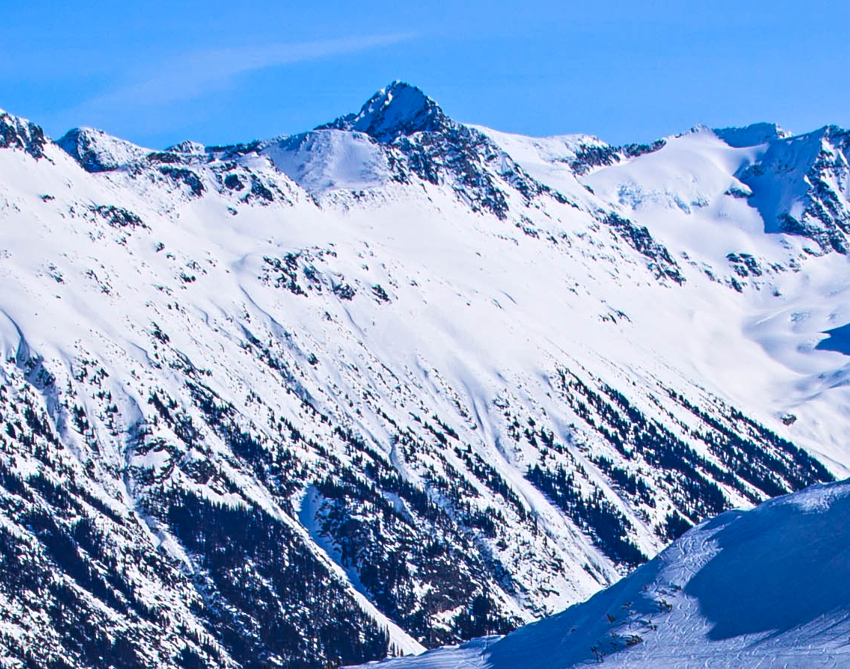
- Tremor Mountain as seen from the Whistler Mountain ski area

Highest point
- Elevation: 2,691 m (8,829 ft)
- Prominence: 1,261 m (4,137 ft)
- Parent peak: Wedge Mountain
- Listing: Mountains of British Columbia
- Coordinates: 50°03′19″N 122°48′17″W

Geography
- Location within British Columbia Location within Canada
- Interactive map of Tremor Mountain
- Country: Canada
- Province: British Columbia
- District: New Westminster Land District
- Protected area: Garibaldi Provincial Park
- Parent range: Spearhead Range; Garibaldi Ranges; Coast Ranges
- Topo map: NTS 92J2 Whistler

Climbing
- First ascent: 1928
- Easiest route: East ridge

Tremor Mountain is a prominent 2,691-metre (8,829-foot) summit located in the Garibaldi Ranges of the Coast Mountains, in Garibaldi Provincial Park of southwestern British Columbia, Canada. It is the highest point of the Spearhead Range, which is a subset of the Garibaldi Ranges. It is situated 13 km (8 mi) southeast of Whistler, and 8.7 km (5 mi) south of Wedge Mountain, its nearest higher peak. Precipitation runoff from the south side of the peak as well as meltwater from the Platform Glacier drains into Fitzsimmons Creek which is a tributary of the Green River. Meltwater from the Tremor Glacier on the northwestern slope drains to Wedge Creek, and meltwater from the Shudder Glacier on the northeast slope drains into Billygoat Creek, a tributary of the Lillooet River. Tremor Mountain is often climbed as part of the Spearhead Traverse. The first ascent of the mountain was made in 1928 by A.J. Campbell Garibaldi survey party. The mountain's name origin refers to unexplained earth tremors when the first ascent party was on the summit. The mountain's toponym was officially adopted on September 6, 1951, by the Geographical Names Board of Canada.

== Climate ==
Based on the Köppen climate classification, Tremor Mountain is located in the marine west coast climate zone of western North America. Most weather fronts originate in the Pacific Ocean, and travel east toward the Coast Mountains where they are forced upward by the range (orographic lift), causing them to drop their moisture in the form of rain or snowfall. As a result, the Coast Mountains experience high precipitation, especially during the winter months in the form of snowfall. Winter temperatures can drop below −20 °C with wind chill factors below −30 °C. The months July through September offer the most favorable weather for climbing Tremor Mountain.

== Climbing Routes ==
Established climbing routes on Tremor Mountain:

- East Ridge
- West Face
- North Face
- West Ridge

== Gallery ==
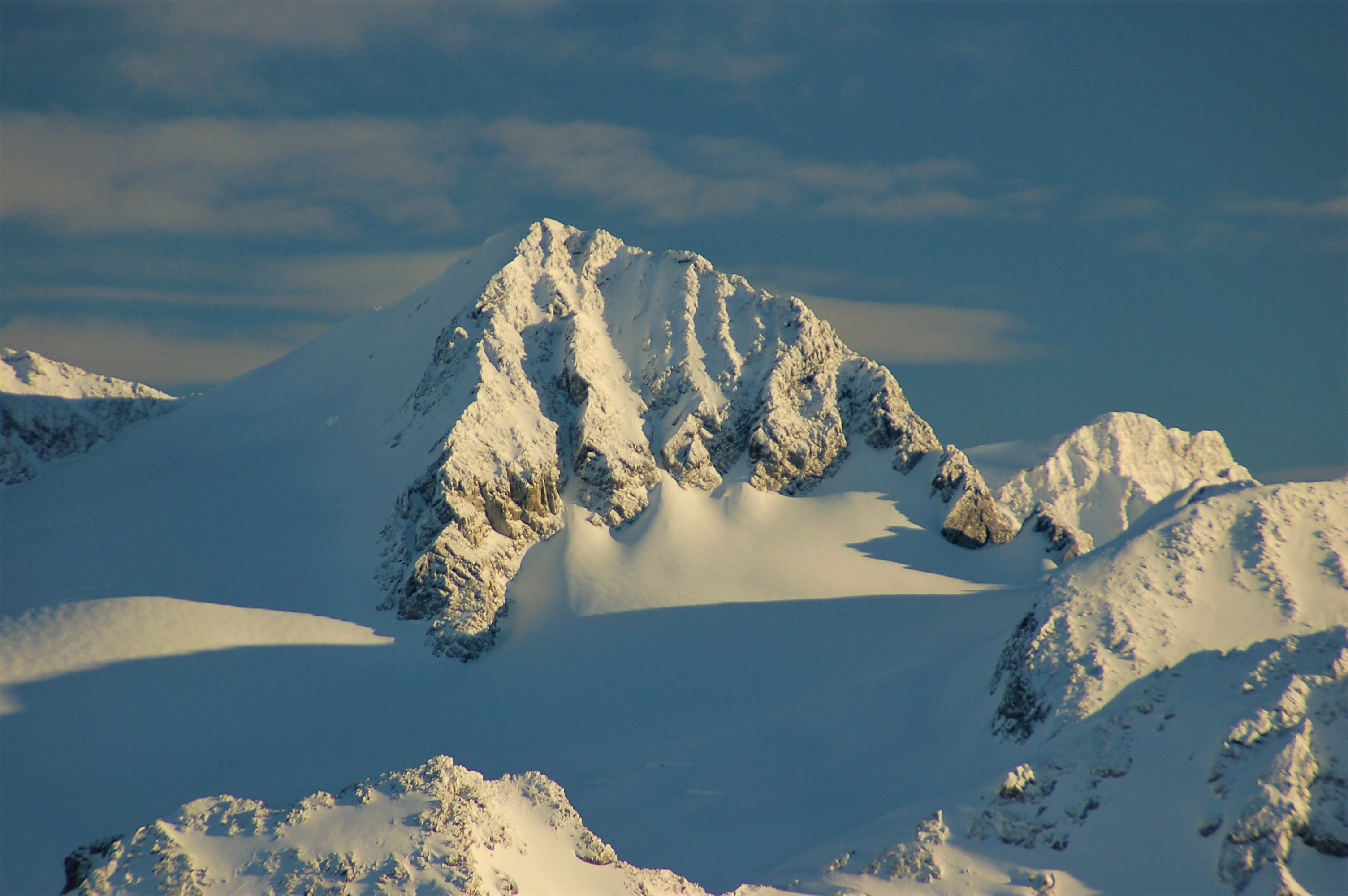
Northwest aspect

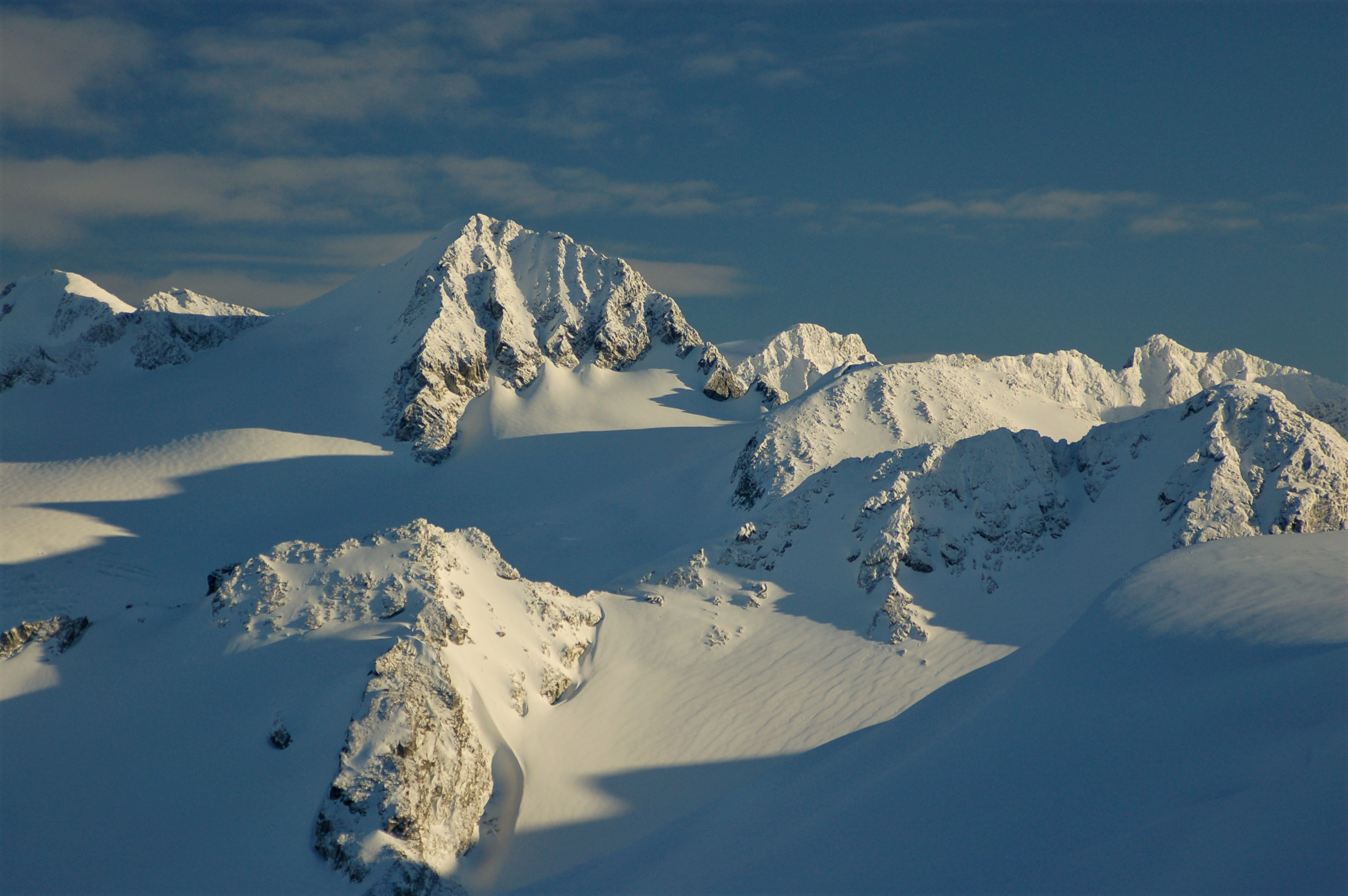
Northwest aspect

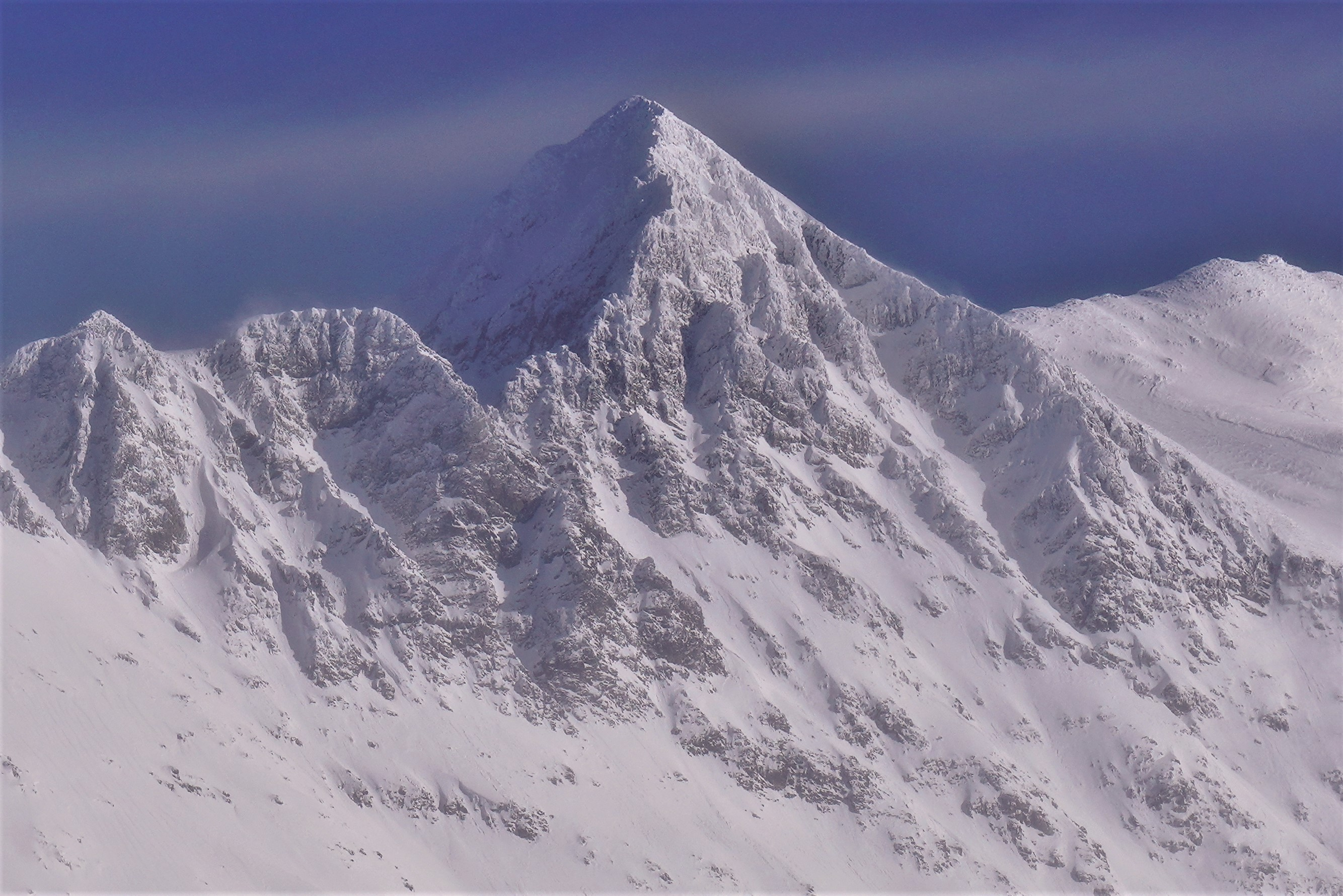
Tremor Mountain in winter

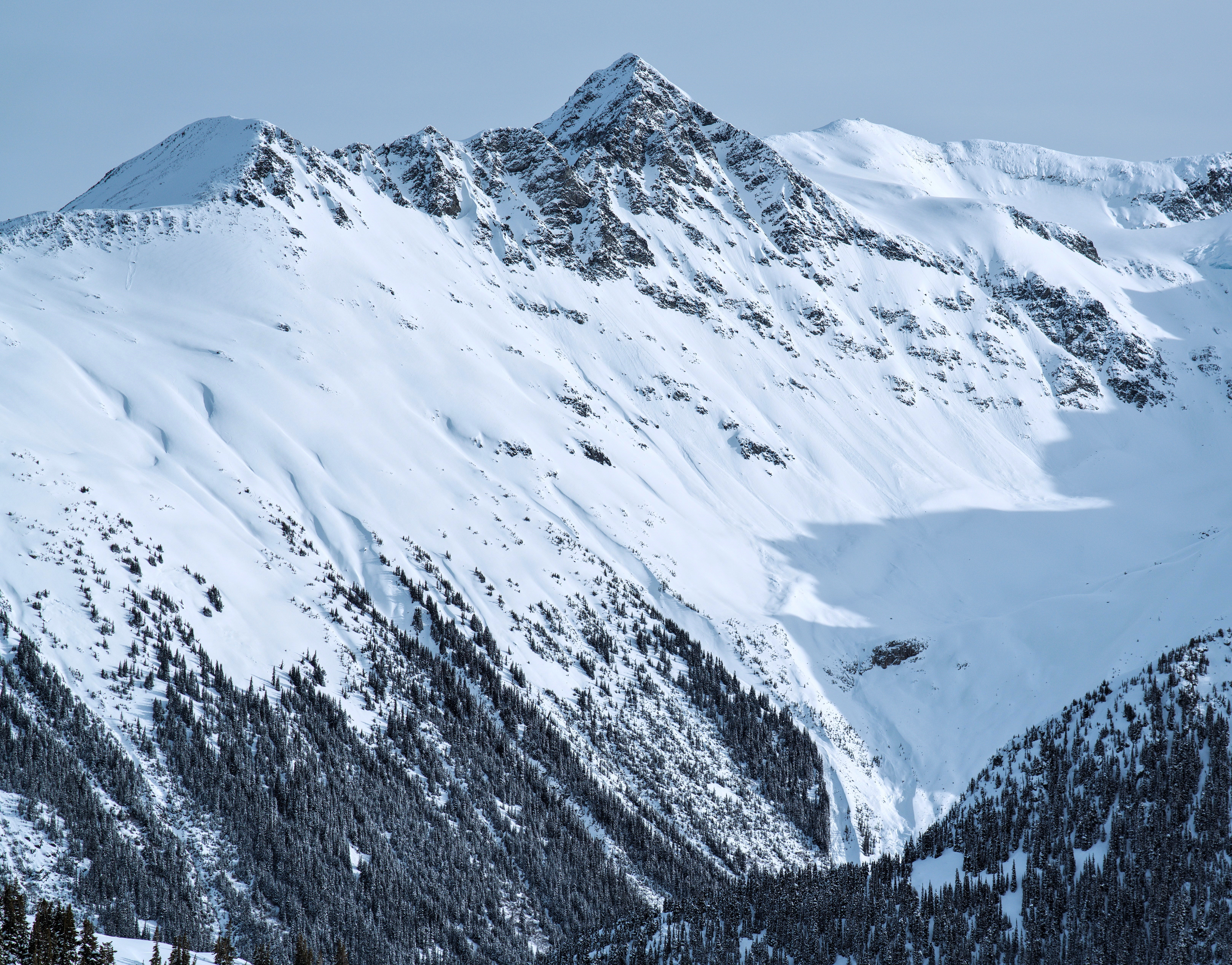
Tremor Mountain in winter

== See also ==
- Geography of British Columbia
- Geology of British Columbia
