= Callaghan =

Callaghan most commonly refers to O'Callaghan, an Anglicized Irish surname.

Callaghan may also refer to:

== People ==
- Aaron Callaghan (born 1966), Irish footballer with Crewe Alexandra and Crusaders
- Sir Alfred John Callaghan (1865–1940), Irish politician and barrister
- Alice Callaghan (born 1947), Canadian Catholic nun and Episcopalian priest
- Aloysius R. Callaghan (born 1946), American Roman Catholic priest
- Amanda Callaghan (fl. from 1989), British entomologist
- Amy Callaghan (born 1992), British Member of Parliament for Scottish National Party, elected 2019
- Andrew Callaghan (born 1997), American journalist
- Audrey Callaghan (1915–2005), English dietician
- Ayden Callaghan (born 1981), English actor
- Barry Callaghan (born 1937), Canadian author
- Barry Callaghan (footballer) (born 1986), Scottish footballer with Queen of the South
- Sir Bede Callaghan (1912–1993), Australian banker and university administrator
- Sir Bill Callaghan (born 1948), British trade unionist
- B. J. Callaghan (born 1981) American soccer coach
- Brendan Callaghan (born 1948), British psychologist of religion
- Bryan Callaghan Jr. (1852–1912), mayor of San Antonio, Texas
- Catherine Callaghan (1931–2019), American linguist
- Cecil Callaghan (1890–1967), Australian Army officer
- Cindy Callaghan (born c. 1976), American author of children's books
- Colleen Callaghan (1931–2020), American hair stylist
- Craig Callaghan (born 1976), Australian Rules footballer with Fremantle and St Kilda
- Daniel Callaghan (disambiguation), several people
- David Callaghan (disambiguation), several people
- Duke Callaghan (1914–2002), American cinematographer
- Eamonn Callaghan, Irish Gaelic footballer
- Elizabeth Callaghan (1802–1852), Irish convict, early settler of Australia
- Emma Callaghan (1884–1979), Australian Aboriginal midwife and activist
- Ernie Callaghan (1910–1972), English footballer with Aston Villa
- Finn Callaghan (born 2003), Australian Rules footballer with Greater Western Sydney Giants
- Frank Callaghan (1891–1980), New Zealand agricultural instructor and scientific administrator
- Fred Callaghan (1944–2022), English footballer with Fulham, manager with Brentford
- Sir George Callaghan (1852–1920), British officer in the Royal Navy
- Georgina Callaghan (fl. from 2005), English singer and songwriter, performs under the name Callaghan
- Guy Callaghan (born 1970), butterfly swimmer from New Zealand
- Helen Callaghan (1923–1992), Canadian baseball infielder
- Hugh Callaghan (1930–2023), Irishman wrongly convicted of terrorist murder, one of the Birmingham Six
- Ian Callaghan (born 1942), English footballer with Liverpool, Swansea City and England
- James Callaghan (1912–2005), British politician who served as Prime Minister of the United Kingdom
- James Callaghan (disambiguation), several others
- Jeremy Callaghan (born 1967), Australian actor
- John Callaghan (disambiguation), several people
- Joseph Cruess Callaghan (1893–1918), Irish First World War flying ace
- Kathy Callaghan (born 1962), American handball goalkeeper
- Kristian Callaghan (born 1993), English sport shooter
- Leo Callaghan (1924–1987), Welsh football referee
- Leonie Callaghan (born 1959), Australian cricketer
- Marge Callaghan (1921–2019), Canadian baseball in fielder
- Marissa Callaghan (born 1985), footballer from Northern Ireland with Cliftonville
- Martin Callaghan (born 1962), Australian water polo player
- Martina Callaghan, Irish medical physicist
- Marty Callaghan (1900–1975), American baseball outfielder
- Mary Rose Callaghan (born 1944), Irish novelist
- Mike Callaghan (born 1963), American politician and attorney
- Morley Callaghan (1903–1990), Canadian novelist
- Margaret Jay, Baroness Jay of Paddington (née Callaghan; born 1939), British politician for the Labour Party
- Nev Callaghan (1936–2016), Australian rugby league player
- Noel Callaghan (born 1955), Australian tennis player and coach
- Nigel Callaghan (born 1962), English footballer with Watford and Derby County
- Pat Callaghan (politician) (1927–2009), Canadian politician
- Patrick Callaghan (1879–1959), Scottish footballer with Hibernian and Scotland
- Patrick Desmond Callaghan (1926–1992), officer in the Pakistan Air Force
- Paul Callaghan (1947–2012), New Zealand physicist
- Paul Callaghan (Gaelic footballer) (born 1971), Irish Gaelic footballer and coach
- Pól Callaghan (fl. from 2010), Irish politician
- Richard Callaghan (fl. 1960s–1999), American figure skater and coach
- Sheila Callaghan (born 1973), American playwright
- Simon Callaghan (born 1983), English racehorse trainer
- Slade Callaghan (born 1970), Barbadian jockey
- Stan Callaghan (1916–1989), Australian rugby league footballer
- Stephanie Callaghan (born 1971), Scottish politician for Scottish National Party, Member of the Scottish Parliament elected 2021
- Steve Callaghan (fl. from 1999), American screenwriter and voice actor
- Stuart Callaghan (born 1976), Scottish footballer with Hamilton, Brechin and Berwick
- Tabby Callaghan (born 1981), Irish musician
- Terry Callaghan (born 1945), British Arctic ecologist
- Jeremiah Thomas Fitzgerald Callaghan (1827–1881), Irish colonial administrator (governor of the Falkland Islands, the Bahamas and The Gambia)
- Thomas Callaghan (disambiguation), several people
- William Callaghan (disambiguation), several people

== Fictional characters ==
- Clarissa Callaghan, from the video game Valkyria Chronicles III
- Robert Callaghan, the main antagonist from the movie Big Hero 6
- Sam Callaghan, protagonist of Australian / Singaporean television series Serangoon Road
- Slim Callaghan, private detective in novels by Peter Cheyney
- Dr Tom Callaghan, original character in the Australian TV series The Flying Doctors
- Jules Callaghan, main character in Canadian TV series Flashpoint

== Places ==
- Callaghan, New South Wales, Australia
- Callaghan, Edmonton, Canada
- Callaghan, Virginia, United States
- Callaghan, Texas, United States
- Callaghan Lake Provincial Park, British Columbia, Canada
- Callaghan Park, horseracing venue in Rockhampton, Queensland, Australia
- Callaghan Square, Cardiff, Wales
- Callaghan Valley, British Columbia, Canada
- Mount Callaghan, British Columbia, Canada

== Ships ==
- GTS Admiral W. M. Callaghan, American military support vessel
- USS Callaghan (DD-792), United States Navy destroyer
- USS Callaghan (DDG-994), United States Navy destroyer

== Other ==
- Callaghan Apartments, Wyoming, United States
- Merritt E. Callaghan Intermediate School, St Louis, United States

== See also ==
- Callahan (disambiguation)
- Callihan, a surname
