= Callahan (surname) =

Callahan is an Irish surname, anglicized from Ó Ceallacháin. Those bearing it include:

== In military ==
- John H. Callahan (1845–1914), Civil War soldier and Medal of Honor recipient
- Lawrence Kingsley Callahan (1894–1977), American military aviator

== In sports ==
- Ben Callahan, baseball player
- Bill Callahan (football coach), American football coach
- Brett Callahan, American baseball player
- Bryce Callahan, American football player
- Gerry Callahan, sports writer
- Henry Callahan, ultimate (frisbee) player
- Jamie Callahan, American baseball player
- Joe Callahan, American football player
- Michael Callahan, American hockey player
- Nixey Callahan, baseball player and manager
- Ryan Callahan, hockey player

== In politics and law ==
- Bob Callahan (politician), Canadian politician
- Consuelo Callahan, American judge
- Deb Callahan, former president of the League of Conservation Voters
- Dennis Callahan, ran in the 2006 Maryland county executive elections
- Donald A. Callahan, 1938 Republican nominee for the U.S. Senate seat in Idaho
- Ed Callahan, former Chairman of the National Credit Union Administration (NCUA)
- James Yancy Callahan, former Delegate from the Oklahoma Territory to the U.S. House of Representatives
- John B. Callahan, mayor of Bethlehem, Pennsylvania
- Joseph R. Callahan (1892–1977), American politician, farmer, and businessman
- Michael J. Callahan (New York politician) (1858–1902), American saloonkeeper and politician
- Laura Callahan, former senior director at the U.S. Department of Homeland Security
- Sonny Callahan, former member of the U.S. House of Representatives for Mobile, Alabama
- Victor Callahan, American politician

== In music ==
- Bill Callahan (musician), American singer-songwriter
- Mat Callahan, American musician, author, songwriter, activist, music producer and engineer
- Sam Callahan, English singer

== In show business ==
- Bill Callahan (producer), producer and writer of Scrubs
- John Callahan (actor), actor in All My Children
- Noel Callahan, actor in Nickelodeon's Romeo!
- Dennis Callahan, choreographer
- Mars Callahan, actor, director, producer and writer
- E. J. Callahan, actor, known for his roles in Wild Wild West (1999) and Friends

== Others ==
- Americus Callahan, American inventor
- Daniel Callahan, American philosopher
- David Callahan, American writer
- Debra Callahan, American physicist
- Gene Callahan
- Harry Callahan (photographer), American photographer
- Jason Callahan, former unidentified decedent
- John Callahan (disambiguation)
- John Ross Callahan, American dental researcher
- Kenneth Callahan, American artist
- North Callahan, American historian
- William P. Callahan, American Roman Catholic bishop

== As a given name ==
- Callahan Bright, American football player
- Callahan Walsh, son of television personality John Walsh

== Calahan ==
- Cody Calahan, Canadian filmmaker
- Edward A. Calahan, American inventor
- Harold Augustin Calahan, American Navy Lieutenant Commander
- Sharon Calahan, American cinematographer

=== As a given name ===
- Cal O'Reilly, Canadian ice hockey player
- Calahan Skogman, American actor and athlete

== See also ==
- Ó Ceallacháin
- Callaghan (disambiguation)
- Callihan
- Callahan Genealogy and History website

Callahan (surname) Eóganachta
Regnal titles
| Preceded by Lorcán mac Coinlígáin | King of Munster c. 944 – 954 | Succeeded by Máel Fathardaig mac Flainn |
