= Glossop North End A.F.C. =

Association football club in England

Coordinates: 53°26′43″N 1°57′28″W

Glossop North End
- Full name: Glossop North End Association Football Club
- Nickname: The Hillmen (previously The Peakites)
- Short name: Glossop
- Founded: February 1886; 140 years ago (as Glossop North End)
- Ground: Surrey Street, Glossop
- Capacity: 1,301 (200 seated)
- Chairman: David Atkinson
- Manager: Lee Wilshaw
- League: North West Counties League Premier Division
- 2025–26: North West Counties League Premier Division, 14th of 24
- Website: pitchero.com/clubs/glossopnorthend/
Home colours	Away colours

Glossop North End Association Football Club is a football club in Glossop, Derbyshire, England, which competes in the North West Counties League Premier Division. The club was founded in February 1886. Between 1899 and 1992 the club was officially known as Glossop. The team's current home ground, since 1955, is at Surrey Street in Glossop; the colour of their home kit is blue, and they are nicknamed the Hillmen (previously also as the Peakites).

Four years after its formation the club joined the North Cheshire League for three seasons and was league champion in 1893–94. It then spent two seasons each in The Combination and the Midland League.

Between 1898 and 1915 the club was a member of the Football League. The team played in the First Division for one season, 1899–1900, making the town of Glossop the smallest whose team has played in the English top flight. During this period the club chairman and benefactor was Sir Samuel Hill-Wood, who later became chairman of Arsenal.

In the 1914–1915 season Glossop finished bottom of Division Two and was not re-elected to the Football League. Following the resumption of football in 1919 after the First World War and through to 2015, Glossop played at various times in several north-west-England–based non-League competitions: the Lancashire Combination, the Manchester League (in which they were 1927–28 champions), the Cheshire County League, and the latter's successor the North West Counties League (in which they were 2014–15 champions). Following promotion in 2015 the club played in the north-of-England–based Northern Premier League until relegation in 2023 when it dropped back to the North West Counties League.

Glossop North End were beaten finalists in the FA Vase in both 2009 and 2015.

== History ==
=== Formation and early years ===
Glossop North End were founded in 1886, playing friendly amateur matches. They used several grounds in the town, including Cemetery Road, Pyegrove, Hall Street, Silk Street and Water Lane before, in 1898, settling at North Road.

The club joined the North Cheshire League in 1890 and were league champions in the 1893–94 season. In 1894 they switched league to the Combination at which time they turned professional. In their first season in the Combination, 1894–95, they finished runners-up to Ashton North End by one point; the club won their last eight matches with an aggregate score of 23–3, and conceded only nineteen goals over their complete twenty match programme. The following season the team again were tight defensively, conceding thirteen goals in fourteen matches, but a relative lack of goalscoring (compared to the other leading teams) saw them finish the season third in the eight team division. After two seasons in the Combination the club moved on to the Midland League – in which they also played for two seasons: in the first of which they were runners-up to Doncaster Rovers in the 1896–97 season, and then ninth in the reduced twelve team division the next season. In the FA Cup competition of 1896–97 the club won through three qualifying rounds before being defeated in the first round proper 5–2 by Football League First Division club Stoke.

=== 1898–1914: The Football League ===
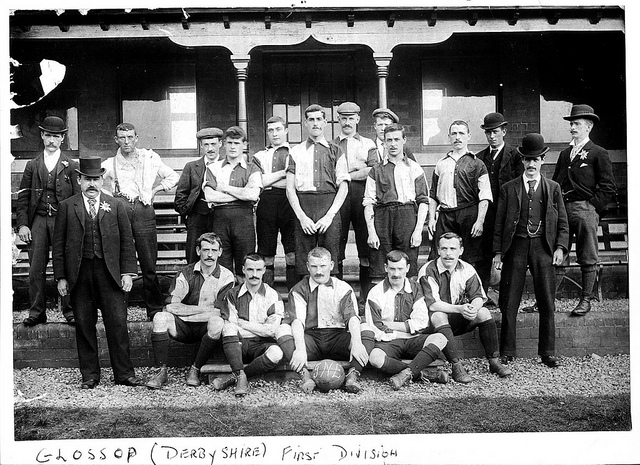
Glossop team of 1899–1900

Glossop team of 1904–05

Glossop team of 1906–07

Glossop team of 1914–15

Glossop team of 1915–16

In 1898, as a result of the expansion of the Football League and the funding provided by chairman and benefactor Sir Samuel Hill-Wood (who was later to become chairman of Arsenal), Glossop North End were elected to the Second Division for the 1898–99 season. That season they were divisional runners-up to Manchester City and won promotion to the Football League First Division.

The club changed their name to Glossop (primarily to avoid any confusion with Preston North End) before spending their only season, 1899–1900, in the league's top flight. They finished in last place in the division (with a W4; D10; L20 record) and were relegated back to the Second Division; the four matches they won were all at home, against Aston Villa (who were that season's league champions), Blackburn, Burnley and Nottingham Forest.

Glossop spent the next fifteen seasons in the Second Division. During this period the club reached an FA Cup high point reaching the quarter-finals in 1908–09 where they were beaten 1–0 in a replay by eventual finalists Bristol City. The club finished in the top half of the table in their first two seasons back in the Second Division, (1901 and 1902). However, over most of the remaining seasons (apart from two top half finishes in 1909 and 1910) the club were perennial strugglers in the division. On three occasions in 1904, 1912 and 1913 they only remained members of the league following re-election. During the 1913–14 season a club record home attendance of 10,736 was established on 31 January 1914 in an FA Cup second round match against Preston North End. Over the following 1914–15 season the club recorded their worst Second Division performance, (W6; D6; L26), finished bottom of the division and had to apply for re-election. The next season was delayed following the suspension of normal League football owing to World War I. Glossop were re-formed toward the end of the war by local dignitary Oswald Partington, but failed to be re-elected back into the Football League on its resumption in 1919–20.

=== 1919–82: Lancashire Combination, Manchester League and Cheshire League ===
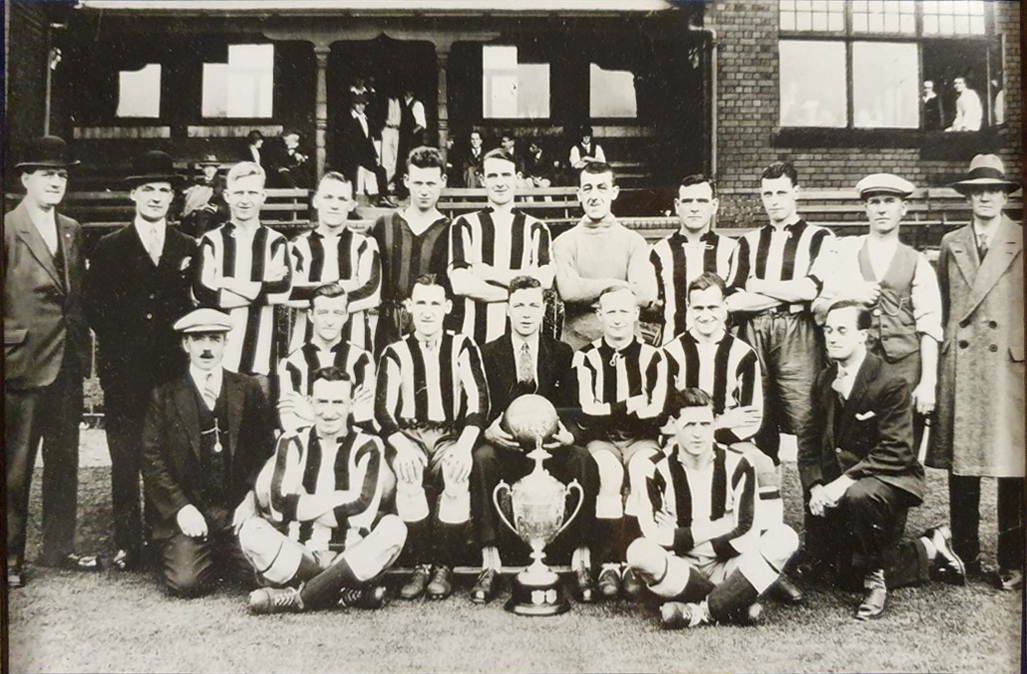
Glossop team of 1927–28

Glossop subsequently joined the Lancashire Combination (in which their reserve team had played prior to the war) for a single season, 1919–20, in which they finished thirteenth of the eighteen teams competing. Northern Nomads ground-shared with Glossop for several years during this time.

The club then dropped to the Manchester League in which they played until 1957 (except for the 1951–52 season). In the 1920s and 1940s Glossop were a leading club in the league: they were Manchester League champions in 1927–28 (with a W24; D5; L3 record), runners-up on multiple occasions and regularly finished towards the top of the table. Additionally the club won the Gilgryst Cup on four occasions: 1922–1923; 1929–1930, when they defeated Rochdale Reserves 5–1; in 1934–1935 by defeating Manchester United "A" 2–1; and in a replayed final in 1949 when Stalybridge Celtic were defeated. In the 1935–1936 FA Cup, having started at the preliminary round, Glossop reached the fourth qualifying round where they were defeated 4–2 by Kells United – this is to date (2024) the furthest the club has progressed in the FA Cup since being members of the Football League.

In August 1951, after failing to agree terms for the rental of their North Road ground with Glossop Cricket Club the club temporarily withdrew from the league. The club rejoined the Manchester League in 1952 playing at the Vol Crepe sports ground. During the 1950s the club recorded mid to lower finishes in the league tables – which included a bottom position over the 1952–53 season. During 1955 the club moved to their current ground on Surrey Street; the first match played at their new home was on 17 September 1955, a 2–1 win in a Manchester League match versus Radcliffe Borough. After a sixth placed finish in the Manchester League over the 1956–57 season – the club's highest position in seven playing seasons – Glossop rejoined the Lancashire Combination in 1957 as members of Division Two. They spent nine seasons, until 1966, as members of the division generally recording mid table finishes: highs of fourth in both 1959–60 and 1965–66 (their final season in the league) and a low of thirteenth from seventeen teams in 1964–65.

In 1966 Glossop returned to the Manchester League as members of the newly named Premier Division. Over the next twelve seasons in the division the club recorded mostly mid-table positions in the final tables; a high of third in the 1966–67 season; and lows of tenth from thirteen teams in 1968–69 and thirteenth from eighteen teams in their final season in the league of 1977–78. During this period for three seasons commencing 1971–72 the club competed in the FA Trophy competition but did not progress beyond the first qualifying round; then from 1974–75 they played in the newly founded FA Vase and in that season were knocked-out 4–2 by Middlewich Athletic in the third round (last 64 teams).

The club joined the Cheshire County League in 1978 as members of the newly formed Division Two finishing in 17th position (from 18 teams). During that season in January 1979 it was reported that manager Derek Partridge, who had joined the club that season, had been awarded a five year contract; under his guidance the club reached their highest point to date in the Derbyshire Senior Cup in 1978–79, losing a semi-final tie 3–0 to (eventual cup winners) Heanor Town. However, league form continued to be poor during the first part of the following season (W3; D2; L6) with the club towards the foot of the table and in December 1979 he left the club. His replacement, Brian Grundy, steered the club to a seventh placed finish in the 79–80 season

Under manager Grundy in 1980–81 Glossop were Division Two runners-up and thereby qualified for promotion to Division One. They were pipped to the title on goal difference by Accrington Stanley who additionally defeated Glossop 1–0 to win the Division Two Challenge Shield. Also the club equalled its best performance to date in the FA Vase being beaten in the third round 3–0 by Norton Woodseats. During the season the club, which had purchased their Surrey Street ground reportedly for £5,000 from the local council, improved the ground and facilities to fulfil the ground grading requirements for acceptance into Division One; also the club organisation had become a limited company. In the higher division over the 1981–82 season Glossop conceded only thirty goals, the best defensive record in the division, but a relative lack of goals scored (compared to other leading teams) led to nineteen drawn results of thirty-eight matches played and a sixth placed league finish.

=== 1982–2015: North West Counties League ===
The Cheshire County League merged with the Lancashire Combination in 1982 to form the North West Counties Football League and Glossop became founder members of Division One. During their first four seasons in the league the club struggled, barely keeping above the relegation positions. In their first season in the league of 1982–83 the club suffered a cash crisis during which players were not paid and departed the club: the club won three of their first ten league matches (W3; D2; L5) after which they won only three more from the remaining twenty-eight (W3; D9; L16) and finished the season eighteenth of the twenty clubs in the division. The club returned to playing in the FA Trophy from 1982–83 and recorded their best performance to date, being eliminated in the second qualifying round by Rhyl. The effect of the cash crisis continued into the next season. Manager Grundy left the club in December 1983 with the club at mid table; prior to his departure the club reached the third qualifying round of the FA Cup where they were beaten 3–2 by Frickley Athletic – the furthest round reached in the competition by the club since reaching the fourth qualifying round in the 1935–1936 season. He was replaced by his assistant Tony Webber, and under him the club's league ranking faded to fifteenth (from twenty clubs) at the end of the 1983–84 season; and then sixteenth and eighteenth over the following two seasons. In the latter, the 1985–86 season, during the latter 1986 calendar year part of the season the club did not win until being victorious in their last two matches of the season which enabled them to escape relegation. At the end of the season manager Webber left the club and was replaced by David Yarwood.

In 1986 the club marked their centenary season with a match against Arsenal – the two clubs being linked by the common historic ownership of Sir Samuel Hill-Wood. The club equalled their best performance in reaching the second qualifying round of the FA Trophy in 1986 before losing 2–0 to Whitley Bay. In the league in 1986–87 the club endured a run of 22 matches without a win (D7; L15) which was brought to an end in February 1987 by a team revamped by manager John Sainty who had replaced Yarwood six weeks previously. Sainty left the club in mid March 1987, replaced by Neil Wilson on a caretaker basis. That season the club finished bottom of the league, having suffered 25 defeats over their 38 match programme (W5; D8; L25), but escaped relegation as Division One was being reconstituted, advancing clubs from Division Two to replace the twelve clubs that had left to join the newly formed Division One of the Northern Premier League. There was no reprieve the following 1987–88 season when a bottom placed finish, and 25 defeats over 34 matches (W5; D4; L25) resulted in relegation to Division Two.

In the clubs first two seasons in Division Two lower table finishes were recorded, the third 1990–91 was one of contrasts. Under new manager Brent Peters things were positive: in the FA Vase competition (to which the club had returned to in 1987) they reached the fourth round (last 32 teams) where they were defeated in a replay 2–1 by Cammell Laird; and although in November 1990 the club unsuccessfully requested to withdraw from the North West Counties Football League Division Two Cup competition (owing to fixture congestion) they eventually won the trophy beating Cheadle Town 2–1 in the final. Off the pitch things were not so positive as the club was plunged into an existential financial induced crisis: this had its beginnings in January 1990 when brewers Samuel Websters and Wilsons recalled a £17,000 loan, which the club paid off with the assistance of a loan from the local council; in December 1990 ambitious new club Chairman Peter Smith sold the club's ground (with a view of building another elsewhere) to the local council for a reported £75,000, in effect netting £55,000 after settling the council loan; but when he left shortly afterwards it was discovered the club still had debts – one of which, £3,000 owed to Lincoln City for the transfer of goalkeeper Andy Gorton], caused the FA to temporarily suspend the club from playing; additionally they were expelled from the North West Counties League Cup competition, and the latter organisation actively considered expelling the club from the league itself; an emergency new board of directors took over in January 1991 and negotiated the club through the immediate crisis. As a post script to the financial crisis in December 1991, to put the club on a clean financial footing, a new Limited Company was formed to run the football club which from the start of the following 1992–93 season adopted its former name Glossop North End.

Prior to the name change Glossop, who had appointed Roy Soule as manager in June 1991, finished in sixth-place in Division Two in 1991–92; the club were not in the promotion places but as a consequence of the league expanding Division One the club were amongst those advanced into the higher division (in preference to other higher placed division two clubs). Over the next sixteen seasons that the club were members of Division One they mostly struggled towards the foot of the table (with highpoints of top ten finishes on four occasions 1994–95, 1997–98, 2006–07, and 2007–08) but there were some cup highlights. In their first season under the club's original name of Glossop North End (GNE), 1992–93, the club reached the semi-finals of the North West Counties League Cup, before losing to Nantwich Town 5–2 over two legs. The start of the 1993–94 season saw the appointment of Gordon Rayner as manager however, he resigned shortly afterwards in October 1993, replaced on a caretaker basis by Peter O'Brien.

In December 1993, after new permanent manager Ged Coyne had been appointed, the club equalled their best FA Vase performance when they reached the fourth round (last 32) once again losing 3–2 at Southern League Midland Division club Bridgnorth Town. The club featured in the semi-finals of the League's floodlit Cup in 1994–95 (floodlights having been installed at Surrey Street in 1992), losing to Penrith 3–1 over two legs. In September 1996 club manager Ged Coyne stepped down and was replaced by his assistant Syd White. Under White later in the 1996–97 season GNE beat Trafford in the final of the Manchester Premier Cup at Old Trafford and the following season, 1997–98, they won the competition again, beating Radcliffe Borough in the final at Maine Road. Additionally in the latter season the club reached the semi-finals of the North West Counties League Cup, losing to Vauxhall Motors 3–1 over two legs. In 1998–99 the club progressed to the FA Cup third qualifying round where they were defeated 3–2 by Grantham Town of the Southern League Premier Division – a performance equal to that of 1983–84 but one round fewer than 1935–36, that being the best achieved since being a Football League club.

Micky Boyle was appointed manager in June 1999 having, like his predecessor Syd White, been upgraded from assistant manager. Under Boyle in January 2000, the club once again played in the fourth round (last 32) of the FA Vase, losing 1–0 to eventual losing finalists Chippenham Town of the Western Football League. In 2001 Syd White returned as a caretaker manager and Glossop North End won, for the first time, the Derbyshire Senior Cup defeating Glapwell – over the two-legged final the scores were level (both drawn matches, 3–3 away and 2–2 at home) before Glossop won 4–2 on penalties. In the league the club continued struggling to avoid relegation and conceded in excess of one hundred goals in three successive seasons between 2000–01 and 2002–03. Chris Nicholson was appointed manager in July 2001, the ninth position GNE attained in the 2006–07 season was the highest attained in his six seasons at the club. He stepped down at the end of that season and his assistant Steve Young was appointed manager for the 2007–08 season in which the club achieved a seventh placed league position.

For the 2008–09 season the First Division of the North West Counties League was renamed the Premier Division and the club, under Young, again made progress to finish the season in fifth position in the table; however GNE's major achievement that season was in reaching the final of the 2008–09 national FA Vase competition. The club battled through nine rounds (from the first qualifying round) to reach the final; in the two legged semi-final against Spartan South Midlands League club Chalfont St Peter GNE equalised in extra-time stoppage time to take the tie to penalties in which the club triumphed 6–5. In the final itself, played at Wembley Stadium, Glossop North End were beaten 2–0 by Northern League Division One club Whitley Bay. Prior to the final, Arsenal, with whom the club have historic connections (the then Arsenal chairman Peter Hill-Wood's grandfather Sir Samuel Hill-Wood owned and financed Glossop during their run in the Football League in the early 1900s) invited the club to their London Colney training ground to prepare for the FA Vase final.

Over the next two seasons the club's finishing league positions drifted lower (seventh and fourteenth) and in May 2011 Paul Colgan was appointed as the next permanent manager – over the following two seasons the club's finishing position of sixth and thirteenth were similar to the previous two. In May 2013 GNE appointed Chris Willcock as first team manager. In his first season the club finished third in the 2013–14 Premier Division; between November 2013 and April 2014 the team created a run of 22 unbeaten league matches (W17; D5). Also that season the club were beaten finalists, 2–0, to Northern Premier League Premier Division club Ilkeston in the Derbyshire Senior Cup competition.

During the next season a win over Nelson on 19 April 2015, with three matches remaining of the season, confirmed Glossop North End as champions of the 2014–15 North West Counties League Premier Division, earning promotion to Division One North of the Northern Premier League. The club's record over the league campaign had been W33; D3; L4 and it was the first occasion in the club's history that 100 league goals were scored in a season (with only 23 conceded). The club achieved a league and cup double in beating Atherton Collieries 2–0 to win the North West Counties League Cup. The otherwise victorious season finished with defeat in the club's most prestigious match, the FA Vase final. GNE had reached the final after winning their semi-final 2–1 on aggregate over St Austell of the South West Peninsula League – the away leg of which, won 2–0, entailed a 650 mile round trip. Similarly to their defeat in the 2009 final, Glossop North End were beaten at Wembley stadium in the 2015 FA Vase final by a Northern League club: on this occasion North Shields, 2–1 after extra time.

=== 2015–2023: Northern Premier League ===
Glossop competed in the Division One North of the Northern Premier League (NPL) in the 2015–16 season and also competed in the FA Trophy for the first time since 1986. The club finished fourth in the league and qualified for the playoffs, but in the resulting semi-final lost 2–1 to Northwich Victoria. Over the following 2016–17 season the club finished in eight position; at the end of the season, after four seasons in charge, manager Chris Willcock resigned with a managerial record affording him the accolade of the club's winningest manager. In May 2017 Steve Halford and Paul Phillips were announced as joint team managers for the 2017–18 season and under them in November 2107 the club reached its high point to date of the third qualifying round of the FA Trophy, in which they were eliminated 5–1 in a replay by Workington. In March 2018 Halford and Phillips left Glossop to join Buxton; goalkeeper coach Mark Canning took over (initially as caretaker manager), assisted by Andy Bishop and the club recorded a mid-table finish in the 2017–18 season league table. For the next season GNE were allocated into the newly designated Division One West of the NPL; in mid October 2018 after a poor run of results Canning and Bishop were sacked and ex-Mossley duo Peter Band and Lloyd Morrison were appointed in their place and they steered the club to a seventeenth (from twenty cubs) position in the 2018–19 league table.

For the 2019–20 season there was further adjustment to the organisation of the NPL's Division One structure and the club were placed into Division One South-East. Owing to the COVID-19 pandemic in mid March, with the club having completed thirty of their allocated thirty-eight 2019–20 season fixtures, football activities were suspended and later that month the league was formally abandoned with all results expunged. The pandemic persisted into the 2020–21 season and only a handful of matches were played before the season was cancelled in February 2021 and declared null and void – one of those played was a club best equalling FA Trophy third qualifying round match, a loss 1–0 to Workington. Following the premature end to the season in March 2021 manager Band, who had been appointed sole manager in August 2020, resigned to join his hometown club Macclesfield.

Stuart Mellish took charge as manager prior to the start of the 2021–22 season with the club allocated to NPL Division One West; they recorded a seventeenth placed finish in the twenty club division. In the second of Mellish's two season tenure, 2022–23, GNE finished eighteenth, the division's sole relegation play-off position – a match in which they were defeated 3–0 by Northern Football League club Ashington and thereby lost their place in the Northern Premier League.

=== 2023 onwards: North West Counties League ===
The club returned to the Premier Division of the North West Counties League for the 2023–24 season (and consequently competed in the FA Vase) under newly appointed manager Michael Worthington. With a record of twelve losses and only three victories over nineteen recorded league matches Worthington was replaced in October 2023 by Richard Brodie; under him league results improved and GNE finished twenty-first of twenty-four clubs over the season and maintained their position in the Premier Division. The following season Brodie remained at the helm and the club finished sixteenth in the 2024–25 table.

Glossop commenced the 2025–26 season with Brodie continuing as manager however, in late October 2025 after seven consecutive losses (one cup and six league matches) and hovering around the relegation zone with 14 points from 18 league matches (W4, D2, L12) the club decided to part company with him. Assistant manager and former player Lee Wilshaw took over as caretaker manager, winning both matches he was in charge before former Golcar United manager Ashley Connor was appointed as the new manager on 1st November 2025. He resigned after only one match in charge after which his assistant Colin Morrison stepped in as caretaker manager, also for one match, before the previous caretaker manager Lee Wilshaw was appointed as the next permanent manager. His record (including 2 matches as caretaker manager) over 27 league matches of W13, D7, L7 saw the club climb to fourteenth from twenty-four clubs in the league table. Wilshaw also guided the club through three rounds of the Derbyshire Senior Cup to reach the final where they were defeated by Ilkeston Town (who played 2 steps above Glossop in the National League System), losing a penalty shoot-out 3–1 after drawing the match 2–2.

== Honours ==
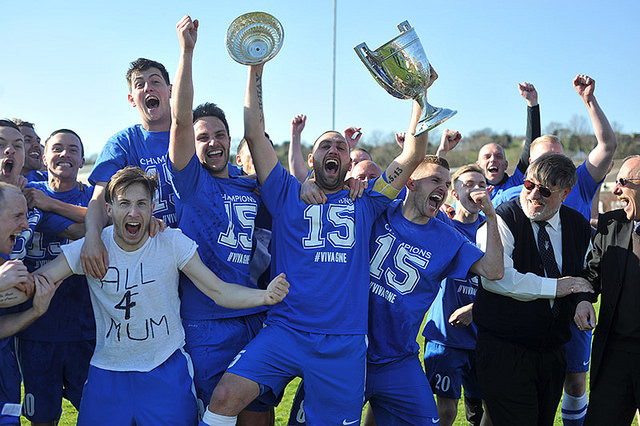
Glossop North End NWCFL Champions 2015

League

- Second Division (level 2)
  - 2nd place promotion: 1898–99
- North Cheshire League
  - Champions: 1893–94
- Manchester League
  - Champions: 1927–28
- Cheshire County League Division 2
  - 2nd place promotion: 1980–81
- North West Counties League Premier Division (level 9)
  - Champions: 2014–15

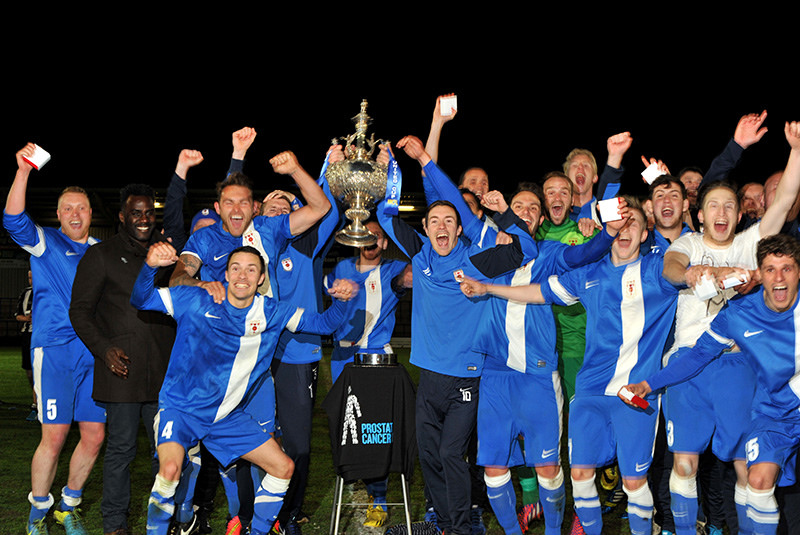
Glossop North End League Challenge Cup winners 2015

Cup

- FA Vase
  - Runners-up: 2008–09, 2014–15
- North West Counties League League Challenge Cup
  - Winners: 2014–15
- North West Counties League Division Two Cup
  - Winners: 1990–91
- Gilgryst Cup
  - Winners: 1922–23, 1929–30, 1934–35, 1948–49
- Manchester FA Premier Cup
  - Winners: 1996–97, 1997–98
- Derbyshire Senior Cup
  - Winners: 2000–01
  - Runners-up: 2013–14, 2025–26

== FA Competition Records ==
Glossop North End AFC

- Best FA Cup performance: 1st round, 1896–97
- Best FA Trophy performance: 3rd qualifying round, 2017–18 (replay), 2020–21
- Best FA Vase performance: Runners-up, 2008–09, 2014–15

Glossop FC

- Best FA Cup performance:
  - (Football League club) Quarter-finals, 1908–09 (replay)
  - (Non-League club) 4th qualifying round, 1935–36
- Best FA Trophy performance: 2nd qualifying round, 1982–83, 1986–87
- Best FA Vase performance: 4th round, 1990–91 (replay)

== Historical kits ==
Home and away kits (where known)
1896/97	1898–1900	1904/05	1905/06	1906/07	1907–10	1910–14	1914/15
1915/16	1927/28	1966	1970's	1980/81	1981–84; Crystal Sportswear	1984/85; Crystal Sportswear	1985/86; Crystal Sportswear
1986/87; Crystal Sportswear	1987–90; Crystal Sportswear	1990–92; Glossop Builders Marchants	1992–94; Davis Blank Furniss	1994–96; Davis Blank Furniss	1996–98; Davis Blank Furniss	1998–2000 Davis Blank Furniss	2000–03; Davis Blank Furniss
2003–07; Davis Blank Furniss	2007–09; Davis Blank Furniss	2009/10 Speedwell bus	2010/11; The Hillmen	2011/12	2012/13; JJ Training Ltd	2013/14; JJ Training Ltd	2014/15
2015–17; JJ Training Ltd	2017/18	2018/19; The Star Inn	2019–22; Victoria Vets	2022–24; Prosthetic Records	2024/25; Pressure Tech	2025–27; Pressure Tech	

== Managerial history ==
Name	Managed		Record				
Name	From	To	P	W	D	L	% Won
Lee Wilshaw	11/2025		30	14	7	9	46.7
Colin Morrison	11/2025	11/2025	1	1	0	0	100.0
Ashley Connor	11/2025	11/2025	1	1	0	0	100.0
Lee Wilshaw	10/2025	11/2025	2	2	0	0	100.0
Richard Brodie	10/2023	10/2025	110	35	18	57	31.8
Michael Worthington	05/2023	10/2023	23	6	3	14	26.1
Stuart Mellish	05/2021	05/2023	88	24	22	42	27.3
Peter Band	08/2020	04/2021	11	3	2	6	27.3
Peter Band / Lloyd Morrison	11/2018	08/2020	75	18	19	38	24.0
Mark Canning / Andy Bishop	03/2018	11/2018	27	4	7	16	14.8
Steve Halford / Paul Phillips	05/2017	03/2018	40	16	6	18	40.0
Chris Willcock	05/2013	04/2017	232	143	32	57	61.6
Paul Williams / Garry Brown	12/2012	05/2013	21	5	5	11	23.8
Paul Colgan	05/2011	12/2012	81	37	15	29	45.7
Terry Hincks	04/2011	05/2011	10	3	4	3	30.0
Steve Young	05/2007	04/2011	215	108	39	68	50.2
Chris Nicholson	06/2001	04/2007	301	95	54	152	31.6
Syd White	02/2001	05/2001	16	2	1	13	12.5
Mickey Boyle	06/1999	02/2001	91	27	18	46	29.7
Syd White	09/1996	05/1999	171	70	33	68	40.9
Ged Coyne	12/1993	09/1996	154	64	33	57	41.6
Pete O'Brien	10/1993	11/1993	6	1	0	5	16.7
Gordon Rayner	06/1993	10/1993	20	7	7	6	35.0
Roy Soule	06/1991	05/1993	106	41	23	42	38.7
Brent Peters	07/1990	05/1991	56	25	15	16	44.6
Jim Royle / Barry Walton	06/1988	05/1990	82	19	14	49	23.2
John Birchall	06/1987	05/1988	43	8	6	29	18.6
Neil Wilson	03/1987	05/1987	6	1	1	4	16.7
John Sainty	01/1987	03/1987	11	3	1	7	27.3
David Yarwood	06/1986	12/1986	25	2	7	16	8.00
Tony Webber	12/1983	05/1986	103	21	26	56	20.4
Brian Grundy	12/1979	12/1983	171	67	52	52	39.3
Derek Partridge	06/1978	12/1979	56	15	8	33	26.8
George Allman	1974	1975					
David Wilde	1974	1974					
George Allman	1970	1971					
Ted Burgin	1966	19??					
Alex Mcintosh	1955	19??					
Davie Weir	1909	1911					
John Tait Robertson	1907	1909					
Archie Goodall	1904	1905					
John Goodall	1902	1903					
G H Dale	1898	1902					

Italic – denotes Caretaker Manager

- Includes competitive league and cup matches to 22 Apr 2026(Ilkeston)

== Attendances ==
- Largest home attendance: 10,736 vs Preston North End, FA Cup 31 January 1914.

Average league attendances:

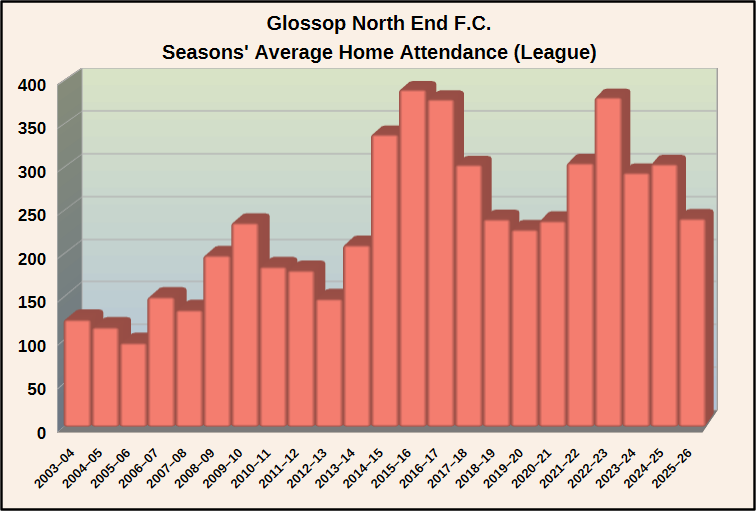
League matches attendance at Glossop 2004 to 2026

Season	Average	Highest	Lowest	+/– %
2025–26	241	339	179	-20.7
2024–25	304	830	160	+3.4
2023–24	294	1120	146	-22.8
2022–23	381	1015	186	+24.9
2021–22	305	505	171	+28.2
2020–21	238	333	176	+4.4
2019–20	228	324	139	-5.0
2018–19	240	498	127	-20.8
2017–18	303	604	170	-20.1
2016–17	379	741	191	-2.8
2015–16	390	529	275	+15.4
2014–15	338	914	183	+61.0
2013–14	210	445	105	+41.9
2012–13	148	180	78	–18.2
2011–12	181	243	116	–2.2
2010–11	185	374	104	–21.6
2009–10	236	658	142	+19.2
2008–09	198	455	70	+46.7
2007–08	135	231	86	–10.0
2006–07	150	1219	64	+54.6
2005–06	97	140	55	–15.7
2004–05	115	184	88	–7.3
2003–04	124			

== Home Grounds ==
Glossop North End played at several grounds including Cemetery Road, Pyegrove, Hall Street, Silk Street and Water Lane before settling at North Road in 1898.

Location of Glossop's North Road ground

The North Road facility was a cricket ground, but also became home to Glossop when they were elected to the Second Division of the Football League. The football ground was located in the south-east corner of the site, with a seated stand constructed on the northern side of the pitch and a raised earth embankment on a triangular space in the south-east corner and eastern sides. During the football season a temporary wooden seated stand was erected behind the western goal, but removed for the cricket season. In a hurricane in November 1899 the wooden stand was overturned and damaged.

The first football match played at North Road was on 3 September 1898, with Glossop defeating Blackburn Rovers 4–1 in front of 4,000 spectators. The ground was last used for a Football League match on 17 April 1915, with just 500 spectators watching a 1–1 draw with Stockport County; thereafter the club continued to play at the ground until the 1950s. In August 1951, after failing to agree terms for the rental of North Road with Glossop Cricket Club the club had to temporarily withdrew from the Manchester League for one season. The club rejoined the league in 1952 playing at the Vol Crepe sports ground.

During 1955, the club relocated its home in the town to a ground located on, and therefore known as, Surrey Street; the first game played on the ground was on Saturday 17 September 1955 against Radcliffe Borough. The ground capacity is 1,301 (200 seated, 1,101 standing).

In order to meet ground grading requirements during the 1980–81 season improvements were completed at the ground including building a new clubhouse, adding a new toilet block, improving the stand and enlarging the pitch. Additionally it was reported that Glossop had purchased the ground for £5,000 from the local council. In December 1990 the ground was sold back to the council for a reported £75,000.

Floodlights, which had been donated by an anonymous supporter, were installed at the ground in 1992.

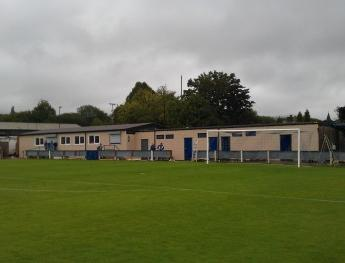
Glossop's new clubhouse

During the off-season of 2010 the GNE Supporters' Club funded and helped replace the team benches with new dugouts. In the summer of 2011 the club upgraded the Surrey Street facilities with a new clubhouse, dressing rooms, refreshment bar and hospitality room being completed prior to the 2011–12 season. By March 2012 the ground had achieved the FA Ground Grading grade of E (required at that time for football clubs to participate at step 4 of the National League System).

In the 2014 off-season, with the aid of a grant from the Football Foundation, the aged pitch perimeter fence was replaced and with other improvements the ground received an FA Ground Grade of D which was required to remain at step 4 of the National League System. In the summer of 2018 replacement floodlights were installed.

Until 2019 the ground was named the Arthur Goldthorpe stadium after which, for sponsorship reasons, this was changed to the Amdec Forklifts stadium. Since 2023, for sponsorship reasons, it is named the Asgard Engineering stadium.

== Notable former players ==
Players who have international playing experience or top division experience who have played for Glossop include:

- (Wales) Thomas Bartley 1897–1899
- (Scotland) Thomas Clifford 1898–1899
- (England) John Goodall 1900–1903
- (Scotland) George Badenoch 1901–1903
- (Scotland) Bob Jack 1902–1903
- (England) Edwin Bardsley 1903
- (England) Fred Spiksley 1904–?
- (Ireland) Archie Goodall 1904–1905
- (England) Thomas Callaghan 1905–1907
- (Scotland) David Copeland 1907–?
- (Scotland) John Robertson 1907–1909
- (England) Leslie Hofton 1908–1910
- (Scotland) Thomas Fitchie 1909–1911
- (England) Billy Herbert 1910–1911
- (England) Harry Bamford 1912–1914
- (England) Alec Campbell 1909–1914
- (England) James Montgomery 1915
- (England) Albert John 'Jack' Allen 1914–1915
- (England) Billy Fitchford 1923–?
- (England) Joe Frail
- (England) Bert Maddlethwaite
- (England) Irvine Thornley
- (England) Frank Booth
- (England) Lee Martin 1998–1999
- (British Virgin Islands) Ben Chapman 2016
- (Saint Kitts and Nevis) Zephaniah Thomas 2017

== Ladies' team ==
The club have a ladies team, Glossop North End Ladies, which was established in 1998. In 2014–15 the team reached the final of the Derbyshire Girls & Ladies League Challenge Cup, losing 2–1 to Mackworth St Francis.

The following season saw them the Challenge Cup, defeating Castle Donington Ladies 4–1. On 11 May they won the Derbyshire Girls & Ladies League Division One title.
They retained the league title the following season, after which they transferred to Division One of the Cheshire WFL.

=== Honours ===
Derbyshire Girls & Ladies League

- Division One: 2015–16, 2016–17

Derbyshire Ladies Challenge Cup

- Winners: 2015–16

== Youth teams ==
Glossop North End AFC Juniors was established in 1989. They have teams of both boys in age groups from 6 years old right to Under-21, and girls in age groups from Under-9 to Under-16. They were accredited to the FA Charter standard Award in 2004, and in 2015 were awarded Derbyshire FA Charter Standard Community club of the year.
