= O'Callaghan =

- Pronunciation: UK: /əˈkæləhən, -ɡən, -hæn/ US: /oʊˈkæləhən, -hæn/
- Language: English

Origin
- Language: Irish
- Origin: Ó Ceallacháin
- Derivation: ceallach
- Meaning: 'contention'

Other names
- Variant forms: O'Callahan, Callahan, Calligan, O'Kelaghan, Kelaghan, Kealahan

O'Callaghan or simply Callaghan without the prefix (anglicized from two separate surnames and clans, Ó Ceallacháin, Munster Clan. Ó Ceileacháin, Oriel Clan) is an Irish surname.

== Origin and meaning ==
=== Munster ===
The surname means descendant of Ceallachán who was the Eóganachta King of Munster from AD 935 until 954. The personal name Cellach means 'bright-headed'. The principal Munster sept of the name Callaghan were lords of Cineál Aodha in South Cork originally. This area is west of Mallow along the Blackwater river valley. The family were dispossessed of their ancestral home and 9,700 ha (24,000 acres; 97 km^{2}) by the Cromwellian Plantation and settled in East Clare.

The O'Callaghan land near Mallow, forfeited by Donough O'Callaghan after the Irish rebellion of 1641, came into the hands of a family called Longfield or Longueville, who built a 20-bedroom Georgian mansion there. In a twist of history, 202 ha (500 acres; 2 km^{2}) of the ancient O'Callaghan land returned to O'Callaghan hands in the twentieth century, when Longueville House was bought by a descendant of Donough O'Callaghan. The ancestral estate of the O'Callaghans, now a luxury hotel, is owned by William O'Callaghan.

=== Oriel ===
An entirely different sept, Ó Ceileacháin in Irish, is to be found in the counties Armagh, Louth, Meath and Monaghan. It has been anglicised as Callaghan, Kelaghan, Keelaghan, Kealahan and other variants. In County Meath, where it is widespread but has been found mainly in the parishes of Kells, Trim and Athboy, it is mainly anglicised as Callahan, Callaghan or O'Callaghan (with local spelling variants). In County Westmeath it is found in the form Kellaghan and Kelleghan. In County Monaghan it is often found as Keelan.

Members of the Ó Ceileacháin family were mentioned in the Annals of the Four Masters as being lords of Uí Breasail, a district on the southern shore of Lough Neagh, and priors of Armagh in the 11th century.

== People ==
=== O'Callaghan ===
- Barry O'Callaghan (born 1969): CEO of Riverdeep Interactive Learning
- Bill O'Callaghan (1868–1946): Irish hurler
- Billy O'Callaghan (born 1974): Irish novelist and short-story writer
- Christy O'Callaghan (1930s–2009), Irish association footballer
- Cian O'Callaghan (born 1979) : politician, Irish Social Democrats
- Con O'Callaghan (decathlete) (1908–1976): Ireland's first Olympic decathlete; brother of Pat O'Callaghan
- David O'Callaghan (dual player) (born 1983)
- David O'Callaghan (Kerry Gaelic footballer) (born 1987)
- Denis O'Callaghan (Australian rules footballer) (born 1949): Australian rules footballer
- Donncha O'Callaghan (born 1979): Irish international rugby union player
- Edmund Bailey O'Callaghan (1797–1880): doctor, journalist, and leader of political movements in Ireland and Quebec
- Gareth O'Callaghan (born 1961): Irish broadcaster & Author
- Gary O'Callaghan, (1933–2017): Australian radio announcer
- George O'Callaghan Irish footballer
- George O'Callaghan-Westropp (1864–1944): Irish landowner and politician
- George O'Callaghan, 2nd Viscount Lismore (1815–1898) Irish peer and British Army officer
- Geraldine O'Callaghan: kickboxer
- Jim O'Callaghan (born 1968): Irish Fianna Fáil politician
- John O'Callaghan (Medal of Honor) (1850–1899): American soldier and Medal of Honor recipient
- John O'Callaghan (musician): Irish musician and DJ
- José O'Callaghan Martínez (1922–2001): Spanish Jesuit, papyrologist and Biblical scholar
- Joseph O'Callaghan (1824–1869): American Jesuit educator
- Joseph T. O'Callahan (1905–1964): Captain, US Navy, Jesuit priest, Medal of Honor recipient
- Kevin O'Callaghan Irish footballer
- Kilian O'Callaghan (born 1963): ballet dancer and teacher, from Monkstown, Co. Cork
- Leland James O'Callaghan (1915–1997): American businessman and politician from Georgia
- Miriam O'Callaghan (camogie): 26th president of the Camogie Association
- Miriam O'Callaghan (media personality) (born 1957): Irish television current affairs presenter with RTÉ
- Mollie O'Callaghan Australian Olympic Swimming Gold Medallist
- Pat O'Callaghan (1906–1991): first Irish athlete to win an Olympic medal
- Robert O'Callaghan (British Army officer) (1777–1840): British Army officer and politician
- R. E. O'Callaghan (1855–1936): English vegetarianism activist, lecturer and writer
- Seán O'Callaghan (1954–2017): IRA informer from Tralee, County Kerry
- Sian O'Callaghan (1988–2011): murder victim from Swindon, Wiltshire, UK
- Therése O'Callaghan: camogie player captain
- William Frederick Ormonde O'Callaghan (1852–1877), Irish politician

== Places ==
- O'Callaghans Mills, County Clare, Ireland
- Liscallaghan, old Irish name for Fivemiletown, County Tyrone

== See also ==
- Irish nobility
- Eóganachta
- Eóganacht Chaisil
- Irish royal families
- Chief of the Name
- O'Callaghan Clan (Munster)
- Callahan (disambiguation)
- Callihan

Other Munster families

- McGillycuddy of the Reeks
- O'Donoghue
- O'Donovan
- O'Brien, Prince of Thomond
- O'Grady of Kilballyowen
