= Alexander Falls =

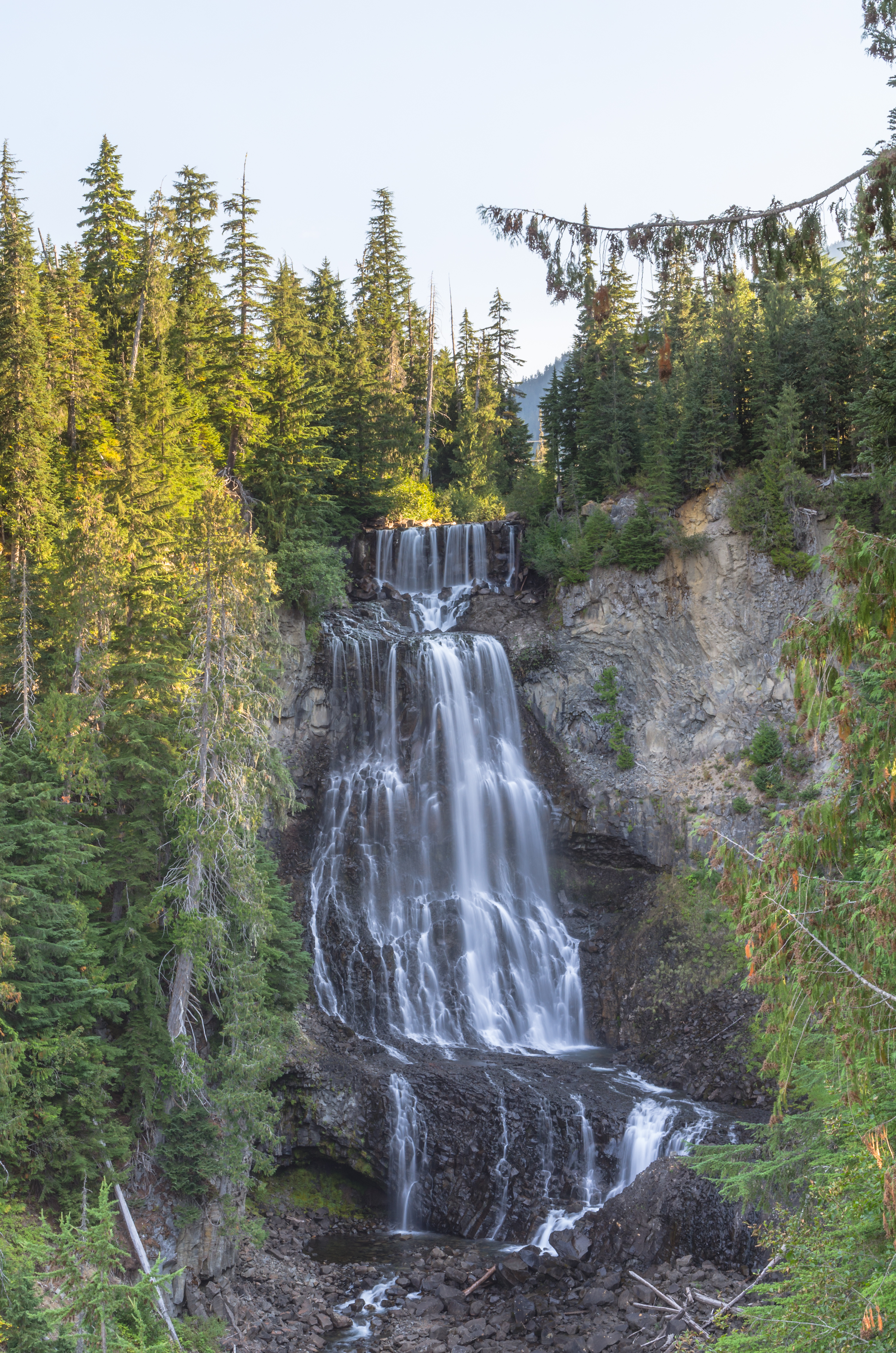
- Interactive map of Alexander Falls
- Location: Near Whistler
- Coordinates: 50°08′08″N 123°07′41″W
- Type: Tiered
- Total height: 141 feet (43 m)
- Number of drops: 3
- Total width: 40 feet (12 m)
- Watercourse: Madeley Creek

Alexander Falls is a waterfall on Madeley Creek, a tributary of Callaghan Creek in the Callaghan Valley area of the Sea to Sky Country of southwestern British Columbia, Canada. The falls are located just below a bridge on the access road to Callaghan Lake Provincial Park, at the head of the valley, which lies to the west of the resort town of Whistler.

The falls consist of three drops that total up to 141 feet (43 m) in total. The falls are about 40 feet (12 m) wide.

== See also ==
- List of waterfalls
- List of waterfalls in Canada
- List of waterfalls in British Columbia
