= Cellachán Caisil =

King of Munster

Cellachán mac Buadacháin (died 954), called Cellachán Caisil, was King of Munster.

== Biography ==
The son of Buadachán mac Lachtnai, he belonged to the Cashel branch of the Eóganachta kindred, the Eóganacht Chaisil. The last of his cognatic ancestors to have held the kingship of Munster was Colgú mac Faílbe Flaind (d. 678), eight generations earlier.

His predecessor as king at Cashel was said to be Lorcan mac Coinlígáin, a distant cousin, the date of whose death is uncertain. The earliest record of Cellachán is an attack on Clonmacnoise in 936. In 939, he was allied with Norse Gaels from Waterford in an attack on the kingdom of Mide. The leader of the Waterford contingent is called mac Acuind (Hákon's son). They took captive the abbots of Clonenagh and Killeleigh but were defeated by the Uí Failge of Leinster.

In 941, in a struggle for control of the eastern Déisi, Cellachán came into conflict with the High King of Ireland, Donnchad Donn, and so too with Donnchad's nominated successor Muirchertach mac Néill. Muirchertach undertook a "circuit of Ireland" at the head of his army, a campaign commemorated in later verse, during which he took Cellachán prisoner (actually given up to the High King by his own people). Cellachán remained a captive at Donnchad's court for some years.

Cellachán had returned to Munster by 944, and perhaps earlier, as in that year he defeated Cennétig mac Lorcáin and killed two of his sons at the battle of Gort Rottacháin. Cennétig was king of the Dál gCais and father of the famous Brian Boru. It may be that the conflict had begun earlier as Dál gCais traditions have Cennétig defeat Cellachán at a battle fought near Lough Saighlenn, somewhere in Munster.

There is little more recorded of Cellachán in the Irish annals. He raided Mide again in 951 with his only known son Donnchad. He died in 954 and Donnchad in 963.

In the time of Cellachán's descendant Cormac Mac Cárthaig, the Caithréim Chellacháin Chaisil ("The Victorious Career of Cellachán of Cashel") was composed, probably inspired by the Cogadh Gaedhil re Gallaibh written for Muirchertach Ua Briain, glorifying Murchad's ancestor Brian Bóruma. The Caithréim portrays the Eóganachta, and Cellachán in particular, fighting against Norsemen invaders, but also gives credit to the Dál gCais ancestors of Muirchertach. It is thought that this is related to the contemporary threat posed to the Munster families by the Connacht king Toirdelbach Ua Conchobair.

== Issue ==
- Donnchadh mac Cellachán
  - Máel Fógartach mac Donnchadh, king of Munster
  - Saorbhreathach mac Donnchadh, forefather of the MacCarthys
  - Murchadh mac Donnchadh, forefather of the O'Callaghans

== References and further reading ==
- Byrne, Francis John (1973), Irish Kings and High-Kings, London: Batsford, ISBN 0-7134-5882-8
- Bugge, Alexander (1905), Caithream Ceallachain Caisil, Oslo: Det Norske Historiske Kildeskriftfond
- Downham, Clare (2007), Viking Kings of Britain and Ireland: The Dynasty of Ívarr to A.D. 1014, Edinburgh: Dunedin, ISBN 978-1-903765-89-0
- Hudson, Benjamin T. (2004), "Cellachán mac Buadacháin (d. 954)", Oxford Dictionary of National Biography, Oxford: Oxford University Press
- Wiley, Dan (2004), "Caithréim Chellacháin Chaisil", The Cycles of the Kings, archived from the original on 7 May 2008

== See also ==
- Callaghan (disambiguation)

Cellachán Caisil Eóganachta
Regnal titles
Preceded by Lorcán mac Coinlígáin	King of Munster c. 944 – 954	Succeeded by Máel Fathardaig mac Flainn
