= William Callahan =

William Callahan may refer to:

- William A. Callahan, Canadian political scientist
- William F. Callahan (1891–1964), chairman of the Massachusetts Turnpike Authority
  - Callahan Tunnel or William F. Callahan Tunnel, a Boston Harbor tunnel
- William J. Callahan (Secret Service), deputy director of the United States Secret Service
- William J. Callahan, candidate in the 1936 United States Senate election in New Hampshire
- William P. Callahan (born 1950), American Roman Catholic bishop
- William R. Callahan (priest) (1931–2010), American Roman Catholic priest
- William R. Callahan (state representative) (1925–1976), Massachusetts state representative
- William Roger Callahan (1931–2022), journalist and politician in Newfoundland, Canada

Bill Callahan may refer to:

- Bill Callahan (American football coach) (born 1956), American football coach
- Bill Callahan (defensive back) (born 1964), American football player
- Bill Callahan (musician) (born 1966), American singer-songwriter
- Bill Callahan (TV producer), former producer and writer for Scrubs

== See also ==
- Bill Callihan (1916–1986), American football running back
- William Callaghan (disambiguation)
