= Callahan =

Callahan may refer to:

- Callahan (surname)

== Fictional characters ==
- Callahan, Pokémon trainer from Pokémon the Movie: The Power of Us
- Bob Callahan from the movie Tag
- Clarence "Razor" Callahan in Need for Speed: Most Wanted (2005 video game)
- Father Callahan, in Stephen King novels
- Harry Callahan (character), in Dirty Harry movies
- Iain Callahan, a former Archon of Caoiva from Foxhole (video game)
- Jack Callahan (Neighbours), from the Australian soap opera Neighbours
- Mike Callahan, of Callahan's Crosstime Saloon in the novel series
- Nancy Callahan, from the Sin City graphic novel series
- Peggy Callahan in the TV series The Bionic Woman
- Officer Phil Callahan from the series Stranger Things
- Professor Callahan, in the movie Legally Blonde
- Thomas R. "Tommy" Callahan III in film Tommy Boy
- Veronica Callahan in Mercy (TV series)

== Places ==
=== United States ===
- Callahan, California, an unincorporated community
- Callahan, Florida, a town in Nassau County
- Callahan County, Texas
- Callahan State Park, Massachusetts
- Callahan Creek, a stream in Missouri
- Callahan Tunnel, Massachusetts
- Callahan, a neighborhood of Orlando, Florida

== Other ==
- A move in Ultimate Frisbee named after Henry Callahan

== See also ==
- Callaghan (disambiguation)
- Callihan
