= William O'Callaghan =

William O'Callaghan may refer to:

- William O'Callaghan (Irish Army officer) (1921–2015), Irish Army officer
- William Frederick Ormonde O'Callaghan (1852–1877), Irish MP
- William O'Callaghan (politician) (died 1967), Irish senator
- Bill O'Callaghan (1868–1946), hurler

== See also ==
- William Callaghan (disambiguation)
