= Thomas Clifford (footballer) =

Scottish footballer (1874–1917)

Personal information
- Full name: Thomas Clifford
- Date of birth: 14 August 1874
- Place of birth: Kilbirnie, Scotland
- Date of death: 19 January 1917 (aged 42)
- Place of death: Somme, France
- Position: Centre half

Senior career*
Years	Team	Apps	(Gls)
1895–1896	Annbank		
1896–1897	Newton Heath	0	(0)
1897–1898	Ayr	10	(4)
1898–1899	Glossop	39	(1)
1900–1901	Luton Town	23	(0)
1901–1903	Celtic	0	(0)
1903–1904	Beith		
1904–1905	Motherwell	16	(1)
1905–1906	Nottingham Forest	0	(0)
- * Club domestic league appearances and goals

Thomas Clifford (14 August 1874 – 19 January 1917) was a Scottish professional footballer who played as a centre half in the Football League for Glossop. He also played in the Scottish League for Motherwell and Ayr.

== Personal life ==
Clifford served as a private in the Royal Scots Fusiliers during the First World War and was killed in France on 19 January 1917. He is commemorated on the Thiepval Memorial.

== Career statistics ==
Appearances and goals by club, season and competition
Club	Season	League			National Cup		Total	
Club	Season	Division	Apps	Goals	Apps	Goals	Apps	Goals
Ayr	1897–98	Scottish League Second Division	10	4	0	0	10	4
Luton Town	1900–01	Southern League First Division	23	0	4	0	27	0
Motherwell	1904–05	Scottish League First Division	16	1	2	0	18	1
Career total			49	5	6	0	55	5
