= Rainbow Mountain (British Columbia) =

Mountain in British Columbia, Canada

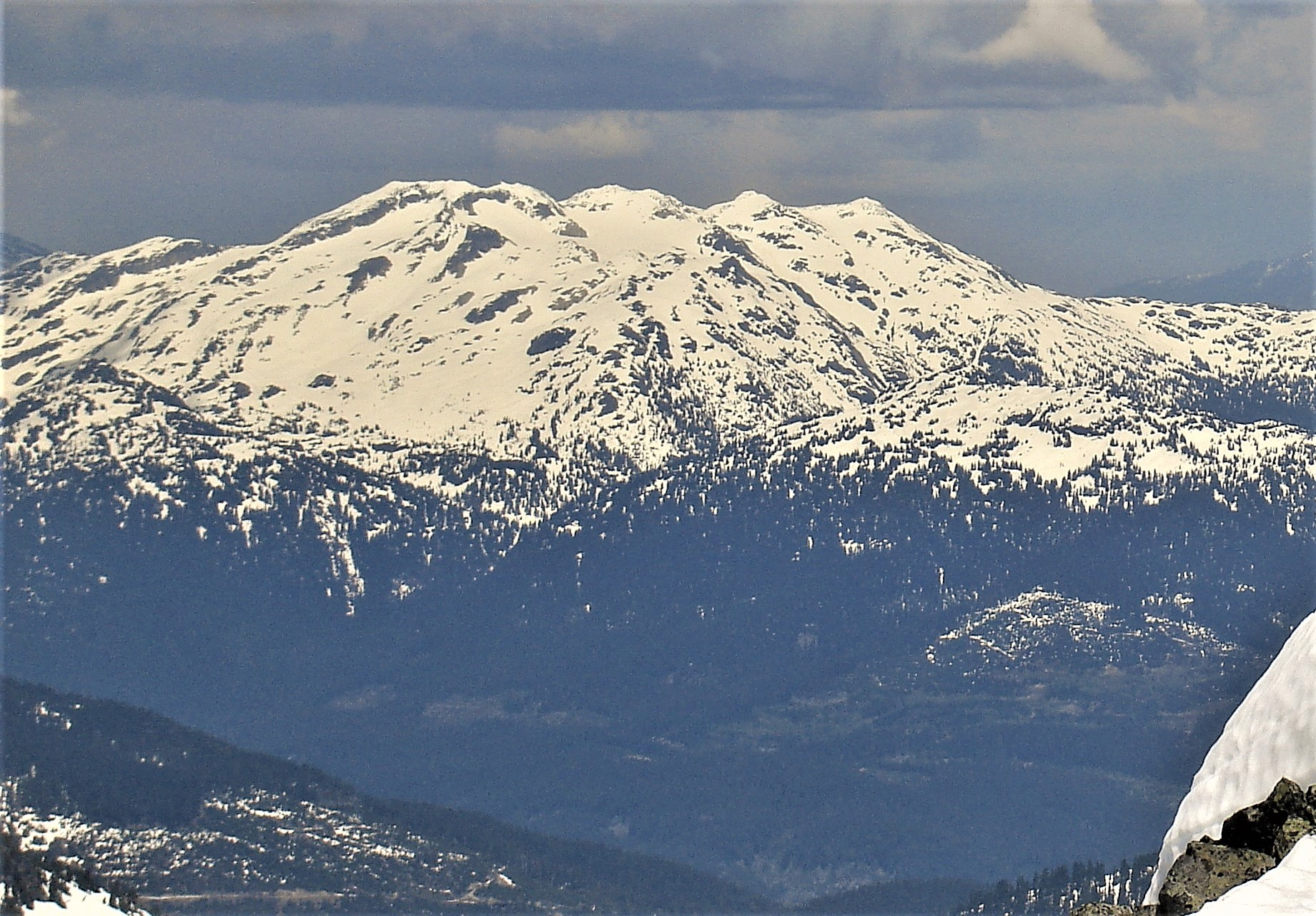
- Southwest aspect, seen from Tricouni Peak

Highest point
- Elevation: 2,314 m (7,592 ft)
- Prominence: 1,019 m (3,343 ft)
- Parent peak: Mount Callaghan
- Coordinates: 50°10′47″N 123°03′13″W

Geography
- Location within British Columbia Location within Canada
- Interactive map of Rainbow Mountain
- Country: Canada
- Province: British Columbia
- District: New Westminster Land District
- Parent range: Garibaldi Ranges
- Topo map: NTS 92J3 Brandywine Falls

Climbing
- Easiest route: Scramble

Rainbow Mountain is a broad glaciated mountain forming the northeastern wall of the Callaghan Valley in the Pacific Ranges of British Columbia, Canada. Located in the middle of the Sea to Sky Country, the mountain is just 9 km (5.6 mi) northwest of the resort town of Whistler, and is a popular destination for hiking, snowshoeing and ski touring.

== Climate ==
Based on the Köppen climate classification, Rainbow Mountain is located in the marine west coast climate zone of western North America. Most weather fronts originate in the Pacific Ocean, and travel east toward the Coast Mountains where they are forced upward by the range (Orographic lift), causing them to drop their moisture in the form of rain or snowfall. As a result, the Coast Mountains experience high precipitation, especially during the winter months in the form of snowfall. Winter temperatures can drop below −20 °C with wind chill factors below −30 °C.

== Gallery ==
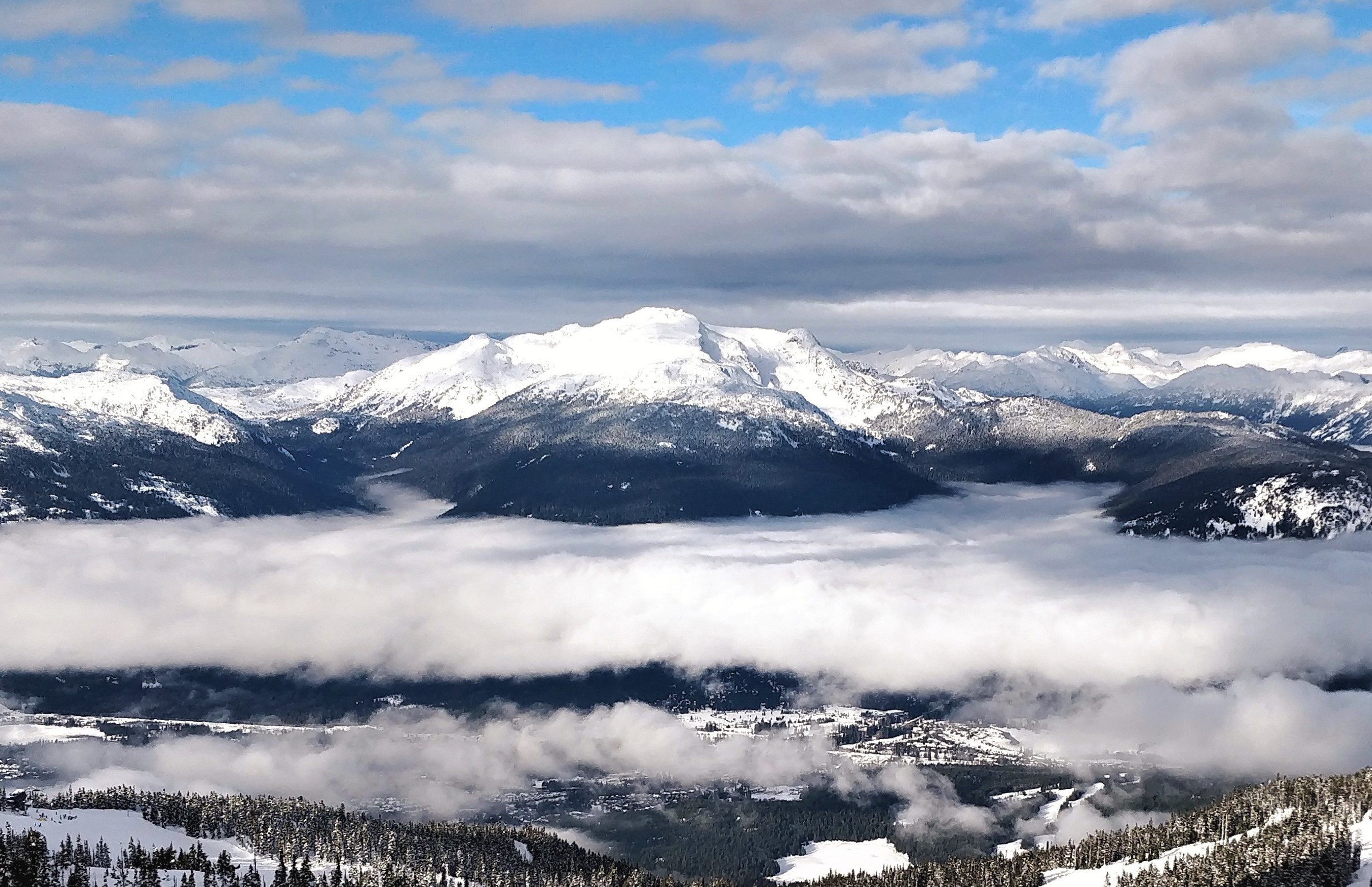
Southeast aspect of Rainbow Mountain centered in the distance. View from ski slopes at Whistler.

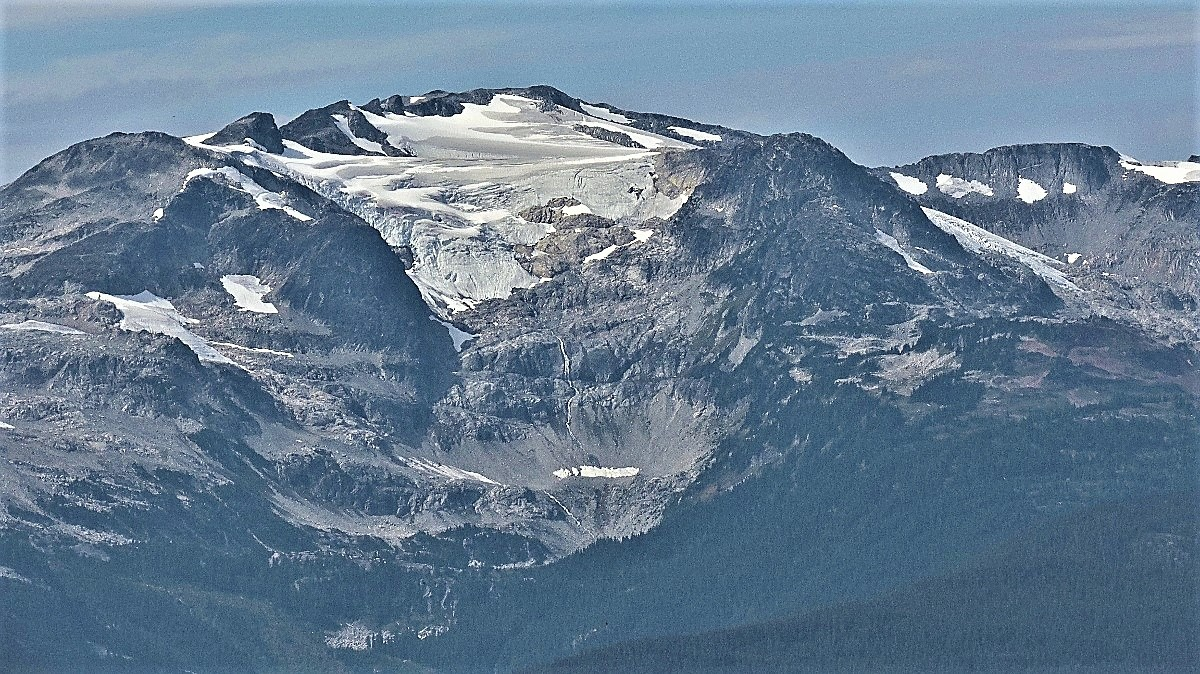
East aspect

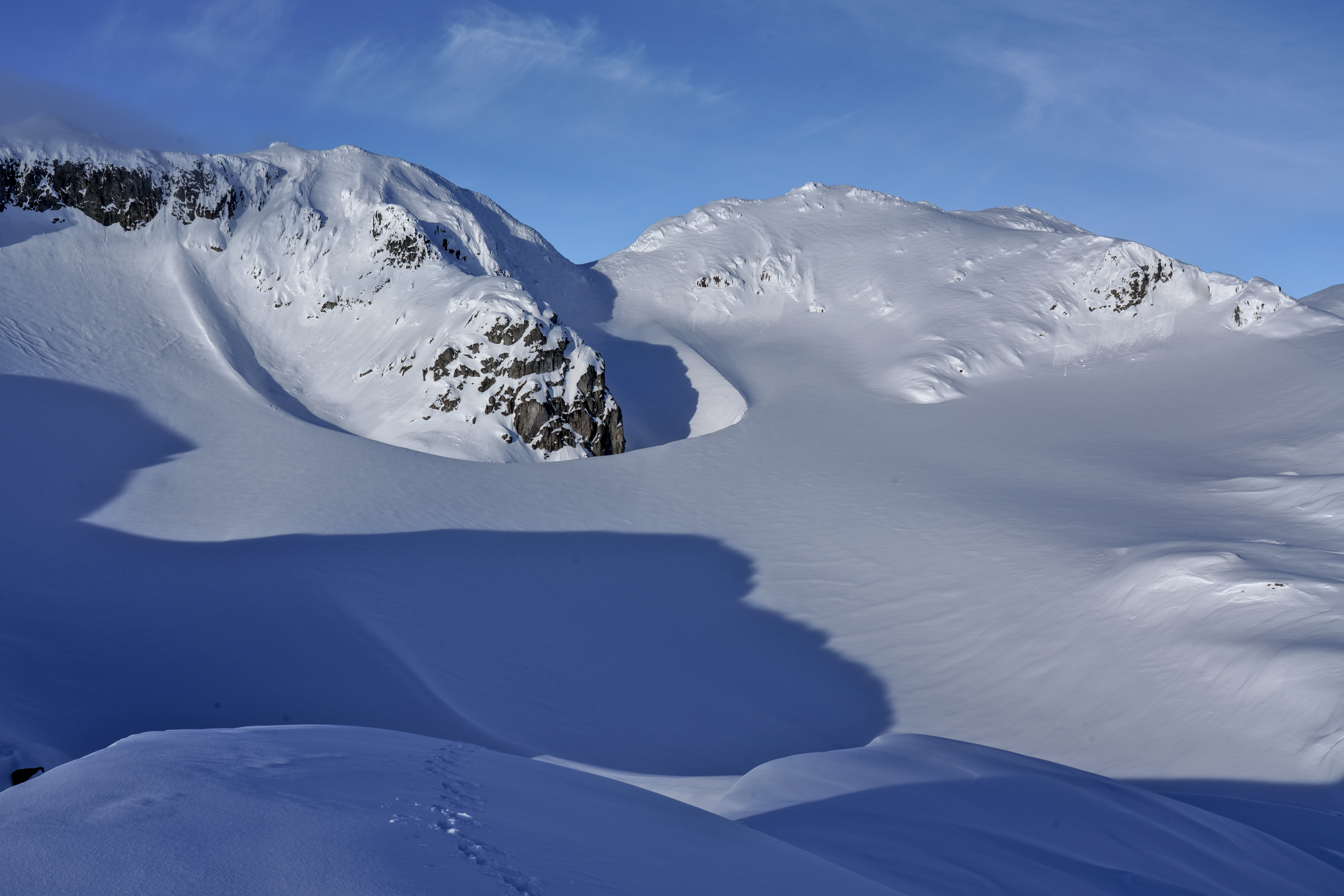

== See also ==
- Geography of British Columbia
