= William Callaghan (disambiguation) =

William Callaghan may refer to:

- William M. Callaghan (1897–1991), United States Navy officer
- Willie Callaghan (footballer, born 1941), Scottish footballer (Aberdeen FC)
- Willie Callaghan (footballer, born 1943) (1943–2026), Scottish footballer (Dunfermline Athletic, Berwick Rangers, Cowdenbeath FC, national team)
- Willie Callaghan (footballer, born 1967) (1967–2023), Scottish footballer (Dunfermline Athletic, Walsall FC, Montrose FC, Livingston FC)
- Bill Callaghan (born 1948), British economist

== See also ==
- Bill Callihan (1916–1986), American football running back
- William O'Callaghan (disambiguation)
- William Callahan (disambiguation)
