= James Callahan =

James Callahan may refer to:

== Sports ==
- James Callahan (ice hockey), founder of the Pittsburgh Pirates in 1925
- Nixey Callahan (1874–1934), also known as Jimmy Callahan, baseball pitcher and manager
- Jim Callahan (baseball) (1881–1968), baseball player for the New York Giants
- Jim Callahan (American football, born 1946), American football player and author
- Jim Callahan (American football, born 1920)
- Jamie Callahan, American baseball pitcher

== Actors ==
- Jimmy Callahan (actor) (1891–1957), 1920s comedy short actor
- James Callahan (actor) (1930–2007), American character actor

== Others ==
- James Yancy Callahan (1852–1935), Oklahoma Territorial Representative
- James Callahan (unionist), American labor union leader
- James Callahan (Kentucky) (fl. 19th c.), Louisville businessman; 1st president of the Louisville, Harrods Creek, and Westport Railway
- Jim Callahan, entertainer and contestant on Phenomenon
- Jim Callahan (politician), Kentucky legislator

== See also ==
- James Callaghan (disambiguation)
