= David Callaghan (disambiguation) =

David or Dave Callahan, Callaghan, or O'Callaghan may refer to:

- David Callahan (fl. 1990s–2020s), founding editor of Inside Philanthropy, a digital media site
- Dave Callahan (1888–1969), American baseball player
- David Callahan (Home and Away), fictional character in the Australian soap opera
- Dave Callaghan (born 1965), South African cricketer
- Dave O'Callaghan (born 1990), Irish rugby union player
- David O'Callaghan (dual player) (born 1983), Irish hurler and former Gaelic footballer for Dublin
- David O'Callaghan (Kerry Gaelic footballer) (born 1987)

== See also ==
- David Callaham (born 1977), American screenwriter and producer
