= Thomas Callaghan =

Thomas, Tom or Tommy Callaghan may refer to:

- Tommy Callaghan (footballer, born 1886) (1886–1917), English footballer
- Tom Callaghan (active 1925–33), Scottish footballer who played for Scottish, Irish and English Football Leagues
- Thomas Patrick Callaghan (born 1938), Irish long-distance runner
- Tommy Callaghan (1945–2024), Scottish footballer who played for Celtic, Dunfermline Athletic, and Clydebank
- Thomas Callaghan (judge) (1815–1863), Australian judge of the District Court of New South Wales
- Thomas Callaghan, an alias of burglar and author Jack Black (1871–1932)

== See also ==
- Thomas O'Callaghan (1845–1931), Australian police officer
- Tom Callahan (1921–1996), American basketball player
