= Brian Grundy =

English footballer and manager

Personal information
- Date of birth: 9 May 1945
- Place of birth: Atherton, England
- Date of death: 23 February 2024 (aged 78)
- Place of death: Horwich, England
- Position: Left winger

Senior career*
Years	Team	Apps	(Gls)
1963–1967	Wigan Athletic	71	(8)
1967–1971	Bury	99	(10)
1971–????	Great Harwood Town		
- Bangor City
- Morecambe
1977	Wigan Athletic	4	(0)
1977–1978	Northwich Victoria		
1978–1979	Winsford United		
1979	Mossley		

Managerial career
- 1980–1983: Glossop North End
- 1983–1984: Mossley
- * Club domestic league appearances and goals

Brian Grundy (9 May 1945 – 23 February 2024) was an English professional football winger. He played in the Football League for Bury.

== Career ==
Grundy qualified as a schoolteacher and played part-time for Wigan Athletic in the Cheshire League, scoring eight goals in 71 appearances for the club between 1963 and 1967. In November 1967 he played for Wigan against Bury in a Lancashire Cup game, scoring and impressing Bury manager Les Shannon to the extent that he was signed by Bury the following week. He went full-time in January 1968 and was part of the Bury side that won promotion from Division Four that season.

Released by Bury at the end of the 1970–71 season, Grundy joined Great Harwood Town in July 1971. He went on to play for Bangor City and Morecambe before returning to Wigan Athletic for a second spell in September 1977, making a further four appearances for the club. In May 1978 he moved from Northwich Victoria to Winsford United before being transferred to Mossley for a fee of £100 in March 1979. He was released by Mossley in November 1979 and later had three years as manager of Glossop North End before taking over as manager of Mossley in December 1983. He was sacked in October 1984 after a poor start to the 1984–1985 season.

While managing Glossop and Mossley, Grundy was the landlord of a pub in Glossop. He later emigrated to Spain, returning to England a decade later. He died in 2024, aged 78.
