= Andy Gorton =

English footballer

Personal information
- Full name: Andrew Gorton
- Date of birth: 23 September 1966 (age 60)
- Place of birth: Salford, England
- Height: 5 ft 11 in (1.80 m)
- Position: Goalkeeper

Youth career
- Oldham Athletic

Senior career*
Years	Team	Apps	(Gls)
1985–1988	Oldham Athletic	26	(0)
1986–1987	→ Stockport County (loan)	14	(0)
1988	→ Tranmere Rovers (loan)	1	(0)
1988–1989	Stockport County	34	(0)
1989	Lincoln City	20	(0)
1989–1990	Glossop North End		
1990	Oldham Athletic	0	(0)
1991–1992	Crewe Alexandra	3	(0)
- Witton Albion
- Mossley
1992–1993	Bury	0	(0)
1993	→ Altrincham (loan)		
- * Club domestic league appearances and goals

Andrew Gorton (born 23 September 1966) is an English former professional football goalkeeper. He played in the Football League for Oldham Athletic, Stockport County, Tranmere Rovers, Lincoln City and Crewe Alexandra.

Gorton was born in Salford and joined Oldham Athletic as an apprentice. He progressed to their first team, eventually replacing Andy Goram when he left for Rangers. He had loan spells with Stockport County and Tranmere Rovers before leaving Oldham to join Stockport in 1988. At the end of the 1988–89 season he joined Lincoln City, but was transferred after 20 games, joining non-league Glossop North End for their club record fee paid of £3000 in 1989. He rejoined Oldham Athletic in 1990, again for a fee of £3000, but moved on to Crewe Alexandra on non-contract terms without appearing in the league for Oldham. He played three times for Crewe before joining Witton Albion. Gorton moved from Witton to Mossley playing four times during the 1991–92 season.

He later joined Bury, from where he was on loan to Altrincham in May 1993.
