= Debra Callahan =

American physicist

Debra Ann Callahan is an American physicist known for her work on the design of hohlraum targets for inertial confinement fusion. She is a former researcher at the Lawrence Livermore National Laboratory and the target design lead at Focused Energy, a fusion power start-up company in the San Francisco Bay Area.

== Education and career ==
Callahan studied mathematics and physics at the University of Denver, graduating in 1985. After two years of graduate study at Cornell University, she moved to the University of California, Davis, where she completed a Ph.D. in 1993.

She worked for 35 years at Lawrence Livermore National Laboratory (LLNL), after joining the laboratory as a graduate student at Davis in 1987. She joined its National Ignition Facility project in 2004, and became a leader within the project before moving to her present position at Focused Energy.

== Recognition ==
Callahan was a member of a team at LLNL that received the 2012 John Dawson Award for Excellence in Plasma Physics Research of the American Physical Society (APS), given "for predicting and demonstrating the technique of laser scatter on self-generated plasma-optics gratings that enables generation and redirection of high-energy laser beams important for indirect drive inertial confinement fusion and high-power laser-matter interactions". Callahan was elected as a Fellow of the American Physical Society, in the 2014 class of fellows, after a nomination from the APS Division of Plasma Physics, "for innovative design and modeling of hohlraums for Inertial Confinement Fusion and leadership in the execution of hohlraum experiments on the National Ignition Facility".

She was a 2022 recipient of the Fusion Power Associates Leadership Award, and the recipient of the 2023 Ronald C. Davidson Award for Plasma Physics of AIP Publishing and the APS Division of Plasma Physics.
