= Mary Rose Callaghan =

Irish writer (born 1944)

Mary Rose Callaghan (born 1944, Dublin, Ireland) is a novelist and biographer.

== Education ==
Callaghan obtained a Bachelor of Arts in English, History, and Ethics/Politics in 1968, followed by a Diploma in Education in 1969, both from University College, Dublin.

== Career ==
From 1973 to 1975, she was assistant editor of The Arts in Ireland. She has had journalism published in The Irish Times, The Sunday Tribune, Hibernia, The Irish Independent, and the Catholic Standard. Some of her shorter creative pieces have been published in U Magazine, The Irish Times, Image Magazine, and the Journal of Irish Literature.

Callaghan moved to United States in 1975, where she finished her first novel, Mothers, in 1978 (published in 1982). The book is composed of monologues telling the stories of three Irishwomen from three generations, exploring marriage, adoption and pregnancy out of wedlock, and female sisterhood.

While continuing to write fiction, she also worked as a contributing editor for the Journal of Irish Literature from 1975 to 1993, and was associate editor for the first two editions of the Dictionary of Irish Literature. She has taught writing at the University of Delaware.

Having eventually moved back to Ireland, Callaghan now lives in Bray, where she teaches and writes.

Her novels have received critical attention. Mothers was reviewed by the New Statesman and by Library Journal; later works by Publishers Weekly, Booklist and the TLS.

== Works ==
- Mothers. Dublin: Arlen House, 1982.
- "A House for Fools". Journal of Irish Literature 12 (September 1983): 3-67.
- Confessions of a Prodigal Daughter. London and New York: Marion Boyars, 1985.
- Kitty O’Shea: A Life of Katherine Parnell. London: Pandora, 1989.
- The Awkward Girl. Dublin : Attic, 1990.
- Has Anyone Seen Heather? Dublin: Attic, 1990.
- Emigrant Dreams. Dublin: Poolbeg, 1996. (published in America as I Met a Man who Wasn’t There. New York: Marion Boyars, 1996.)
- The Last Summer. Dublin: Poolbeg, 1997.
- The Visitors' Book. Ireland: Brandon, 2001.
- "Billy Come Home". Ireland: Brandon, 2007.
- "A Bit of a Scandal". Ireland: Brandon, 2009.
- "The Deep End". ( memoir). University of Delaware Press, 2016.
