= Speedwellbus =

Bus company in Manchester, England

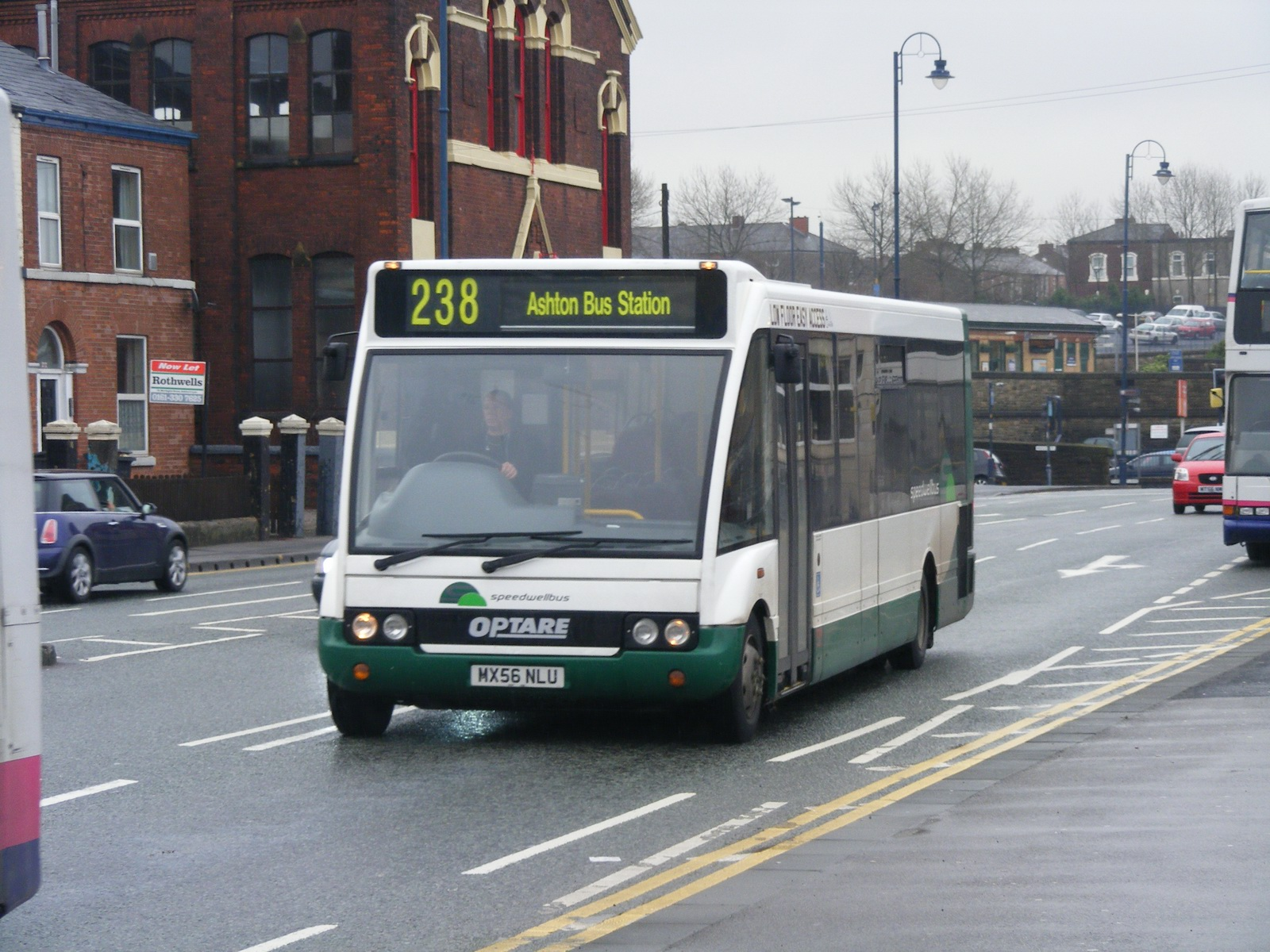
- Optare Solo in January 2008
- Founded: 2002
- Defunct: 2012
- Headquarters: Raglan Street, Hyde, Greater Manchester, England
- Locale: North West
- Service area: Greater Manchester, Derbyshire
- Service type: Bus
- Hubs: Manchester, Ashton-under-Lyne, Glossop, Hyde, Stalybridge, Oldham
- Fleet: 25 vehicles including Optare Solo; Optare Excel; Alexander Dennis Enviro 300; Dennis Dart; Plaxton Beaver 2 Marshall Capital
- Operator: Speedwellbus Ltd
- Website: Official Website – Web Archive

Speedwellbus (formerly Speedwell Private Hire) was a bus operator based in Hyde, Greater Manchester, England. It operated a fleet of 25 buses on commercial and contracted services. Formed in 2002, it ceased operating abruptly and unexpectedly in January 2012 due to financial problems and nearly having had its licence revoked.

== History ==
Operations commenced in 2002 with a service between Glossop and Tintwistle, and were expanded with the addition of contracts from Derbyshire County Council and Transport for Greater Manchester. Being a collaboration between Jack Hampson and David Whyatt, it can in some ways be viewed as a continuation of the Glossopdale Bus Company project. The company was originally based in Glossop until they moved to a base in Hyde. They also ran a number of school buses in the Glossop area. Speedwellbus also formerly operated a "No frills" bus service in Greater Manchester, entitled Speedwellvalue.

In 2009 the company was subject to a public enquiry following the issuing of 13 prohibition notices by the Vehicle and Operator Services Agency relating to vehicle defects.

On 18 January 2012, Speedwellbus announced that they had ceased trading with immediate effect. It was made clear that all the previously operated services would be taken over by a number of different operators, including Stotts of Oldham, High Peak Buses and Stagecoach Manchester.

== Speedwellvalue ==
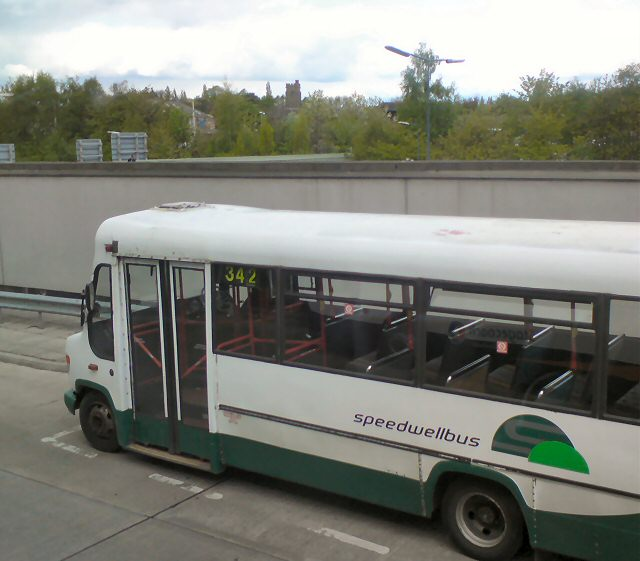
A Plaxton Beaver 2 bodied Mercedes-Benz Vario on service 342 in May 2010

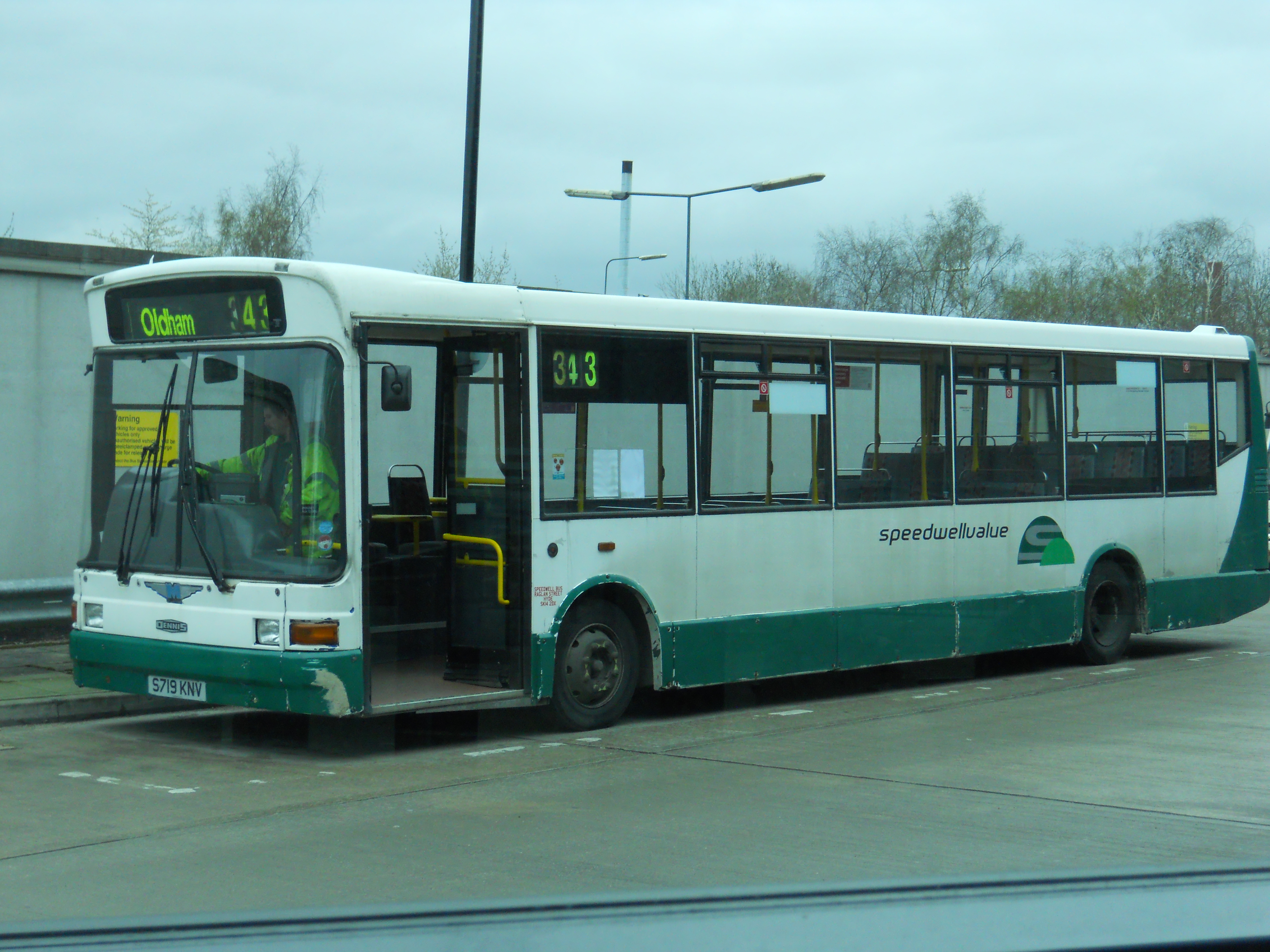
A Marshall bodied Dennis Dart on service 342 in May 2010

On 3 August 2009 Speedwellbus launched a new "no-frills" concept service entitled SpeedwellValue, a low-cost and frequent alternative against other services in Greater Manchester offering flat single fares at £1.20 and 60p for concessionary users, daysavers at £2 and weekly tickets at £9.60 and £4.80, respectively. Branded low-floor buses were normally used, although Speedwell occasionally drafted in other vehicles. The services were designed to compete against the more expensive routes in Greater Manchester, offering a duplicate service that was up to 50% cheaper in comparison.

The first established route was the S50, travelling from Hey Farm to Ashton under Lyne. The service originally continued beyond Ashton into Manchester Shudehill Interchange via Mossley, Ashton-under-Lyne, Droylsden and Sport City. However, a month after launch in September 2009 the route was scaled down between Hey Farm and Ashton-under-Lyne only, due to the heavy delays by the Manchester Metrolink upgrade and other essential roadworks in Droylsden. This was also the last route, being withdrawn in June 2011, but technically disappeared earlier due to a sudden change in Transport for Greater Manchester's change in concessionary subsidiaries, resulting in a large drop in revenue. Works to the retaining wall on the A670 near the Billy Goat Pub in Mossley had caused delays to the route making the service less reliable during the height of peak travel hours.

Shortly afterwards a second route, the S48, was launched. The S48 travelled from Carrbrook to Ashton-under-Lyne via the Brushes estate and Stalybridge, effectively competing with route 348. Not long after its established presence, a full evening and Sunday service was introduced. However, the route was withdrawn in March 2011. A third route numbered S49, designed to compete with First's popular route 409 between Oldham and Ashton, was also briefly operated but was withdrawn in April 2011.

== Save the 397 ==
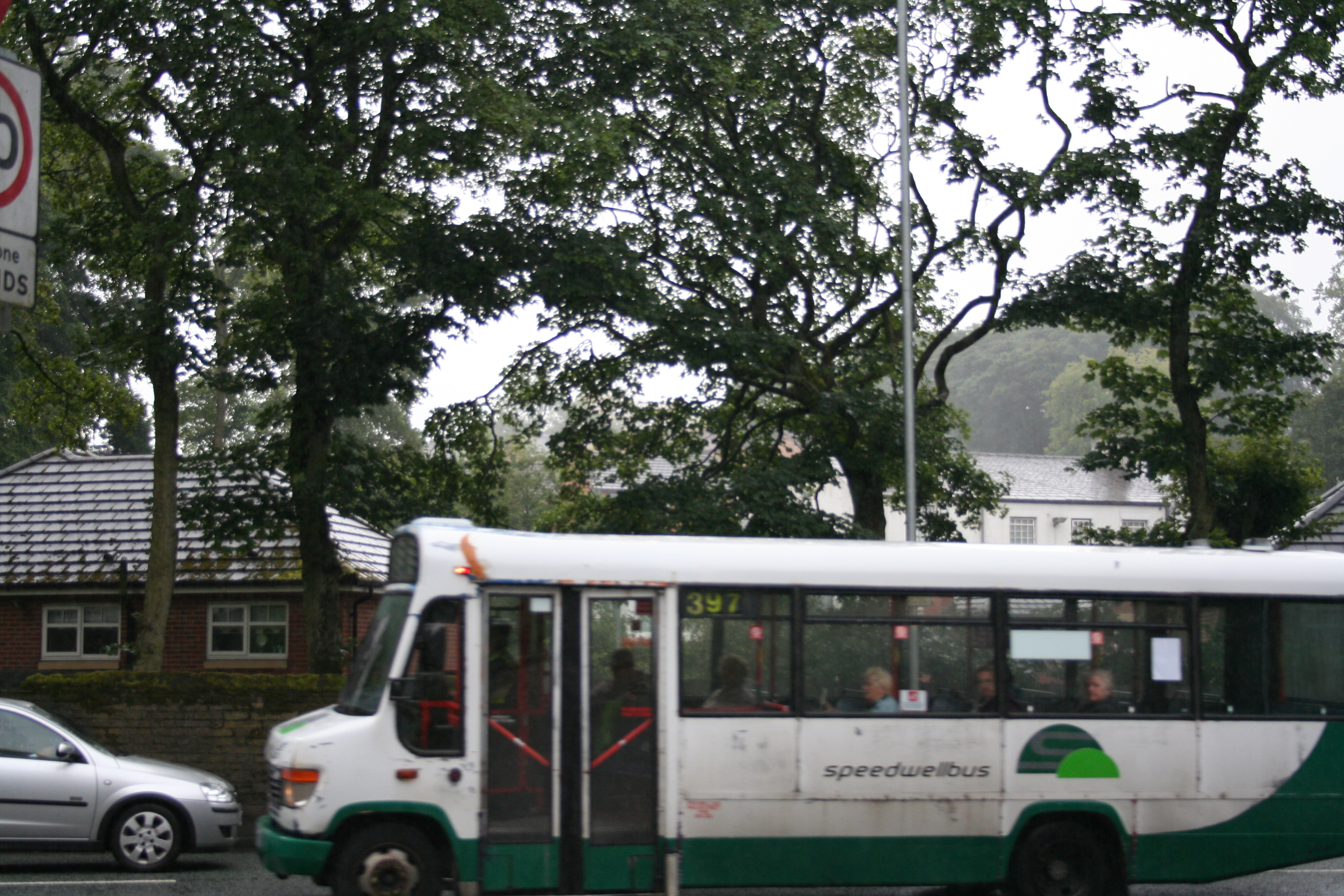
A Plaxton Beaver 2 bodied Mercedes-Benz Vario on service 397 in August 2011

In 2011, Speedwellbus, along with supporters within the Derbyshire region including the Deputy Mayor of High Peak Borough Council voiced their concern to Derbyshire County Council over the decision to potentially axe the 397, leaving transport users in Hadfield and Tintwistle without a bus service to Hyde. A website was created to gather signatures and comments to the council. The route was however withdrawn in October 2011, with all of the Glossopdale school buses following in April 2012 after the council decided to impose the full range of proposed cuts.
