= Alice Callaghan =

Alice Callaghan (born circa 1947, Calgary, Alberta) is an Episcopalian priest and a former Roman Catholic nun. She is also an advocate of the homeless and impoverished people of downtown Los Angeles.

== Early life ==
Her family moved from Canada to southern California when she was a small child. Diminutive and athletic, she became a proficient surfer in Newport Beach. She attended college and became a nun.

== Activism ==
Callaghan participated in anti-war protests during the Vietnam War.

Callaghan founded Las Familias del Pueblo, a Skid Row community center, in June 1981 in a one-room storefront near the neighborhood. She remained its director as of 2021, when it moved to a larger building. She also founded the SRO Housing Trust.

As of 1982, she was an associate minister at All Saints Episcopal Church in Pasadena.

In May 1983, she led a protest demanding that the city of Los Angeles install a traffic light on one block of Sixth Street, citing concerns for children crossing the street in the area.

In the late 1990s, Callaghan worked as a tutor for young Latino immigrant students. In 1998, she supported Proposition 227, which largely dismantled California's bilingual education system, on the grounds that Spanish-speaking students were not being taught English nor receiving an equivalent education to English-speaking students.
