= Tommy Callaghan (footballer, born 1886) =

English footballer

Personal information
- Full name: Thomas Callaghan
- Date of birth: 1886
- Place of birth: Birmingham, England
- Date of death: 20 February 1917 (aged 30–31)
- Place of death: Hill 60, Belgium
- Position: Outside right

Senior career*
Years	Team	Apps	(Gls)
	Small Heath	0	(0)
1904–1905	Halesowen		
1905–1907	Glossop	73	(8)
1907–1908	Manchester City	2	(0)
1908–1913	Partick Thistle	80	(9)
1911–1912	→ St Mirren (loan)	18	(4)
- * Club domestic league appearances and goals

Thomas Callaghan (1886 – 20 February 1917) was an English professional footballer who played as an outside right in the Football League for Glossop and Manchester City. He also played in the Scottish League for Partick Thistle and St Mirren.

== Personal life ==
In March 1916, in the middle of the First World War, Callaghan enlisted in the British Army. He served as a private in the Somerset Light Infantry and the London Regiment. Whilst maintaining an artillery gun, Callaghan was killed while serving with the 1st/20th Battalion, London Regiment, part of the 47th (1/2nd London) Division, by German shellfire during a trench raid at Hill 60, Belgium on 20 February 1917. He was buried in Chester Farm Cemetery, near Ypres.

== Career statistics ==
Appearances and goals by club, season and competition
Club	Season	League			National Cup		Total	
Club	Season	Division	Apps	Goals	Apps	Goals	Apps	Goals
Glossop	1904–05	Second Division	4	0	0	0	4	0
Glossop	1905–06	Second Division	31	4	1	0	32	4
Glossop	1906–07	Second Division	38	4	2	1	40	5
Glossop	Total		73	8	3	1	76	9
Manchester City	1907–08	First Division	2	0	0	0	2	0
Partick Thistle	1909–10	Scottish First Division	28	3	2	0	30	3
Partick Thistle	1910–11	Scottish First Division	29	5	2	1	31	6
Partick Thistle	1912–13	Scottish First Division	23	1	2	0	25	2
Partick Thistle	Total		80	9	6	1	86	10
St Mirren (loan)	1911–12	Scottish First Division	18	4	2	0	20	4
Career total			173	21	11	2	184	22
