= Daniel Callaghan =

Daniel Callaghan may refer to:

- Daniel J. Callaghan (1890–1942), United States Navy officer and Medal of Honor recipient
- Daniel Callaghan (politician) (1786–1849), Irish businessman and politician

== See also ==
- Daniel O'Callaghan, Irish Labour Party politician
