= Mount Callaghan =

Mountain in British Columbia, Canada

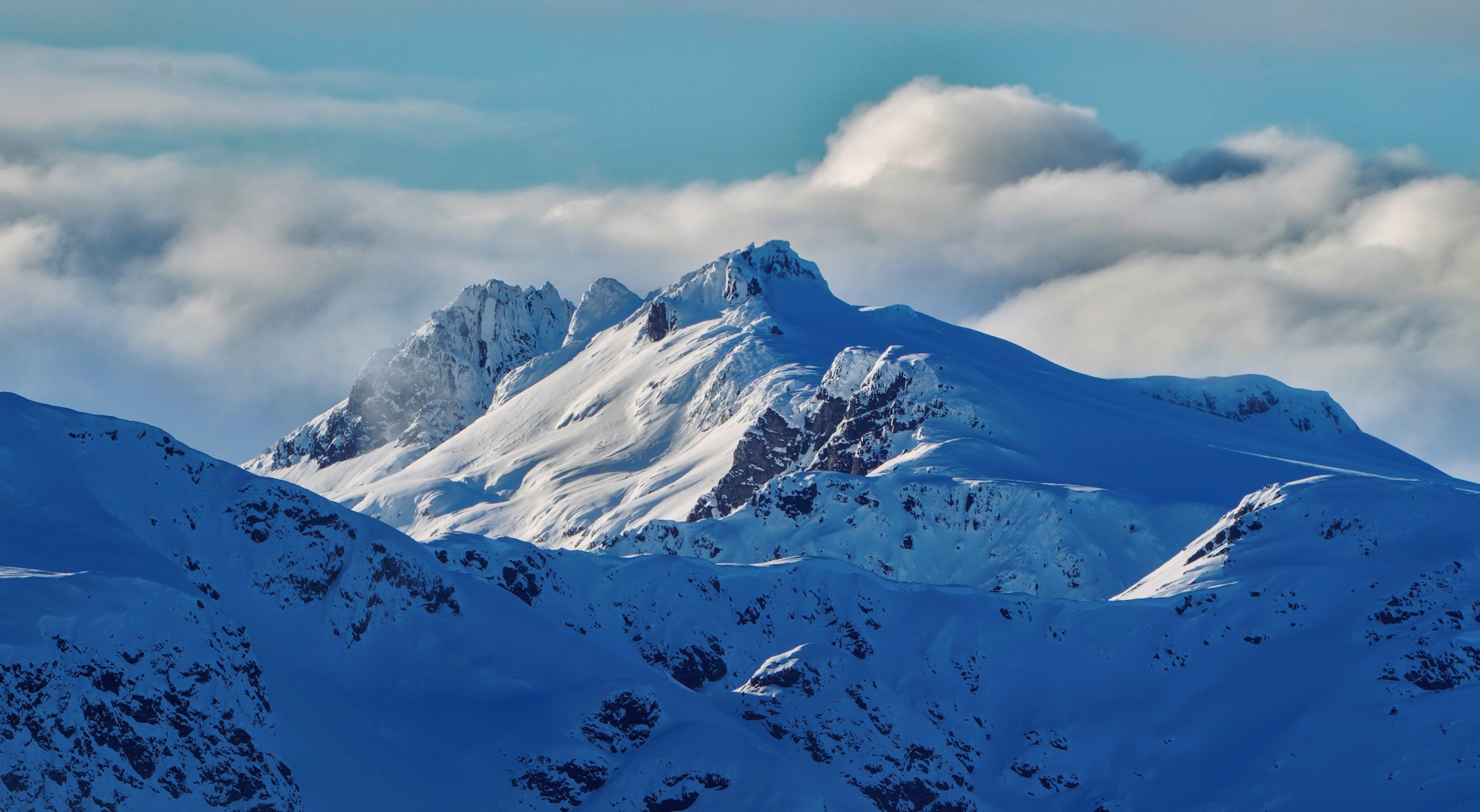
- East aspect, seen from Rainbow Mountain

Highest point
- Elevation: 2,409 m (7,904 ft)
- Prominence: 914 m (2,999 ft)
- Listing: List of volcanoes in Canada
- Coordinates: 50°13′40″N 123°15′58″W

Geography
- Location within British Columbia
- Interactive map of Mount Callaghan
- Location: British Columbia, Canada
- District: New Westminster Land District
- Parent range: Pacific Ranges
- Topo map: NTS 92J3 Brandywine Falls

Mount Callaghan is a mountain east of the headwaters of the Squamish River, just northeast of the Powder Mountain Icefield and just south of the Pemberton Icefield in the Sea to Sky Country of southwestern British Columbia, Canada, about 20 km directly west of the Resort Municipality of Whistler. A crack was observed across Callaghan's summit in the spring of 1999. In 2000, a section of the summit collapsed. Callaghan Lake lies below the south face of the mountain.

== Climate ==
Based on the Köppen climate classification, Mount Callaghan is located in the marine west coast climate zone of western North America. Most weather fronts originate in the Pacific Ocean, and travel east toward the Coast Mountains where they are forced upward by the range (orographic lift), causing them to drop their moisture in the form of rain or snowfall. As a result, the Coast Mountains experience high precipitation, especially during the winter months in the form of snowfall. Winter temperatures can drop below −20 °C with wind chill factors below −30 °C. The months July through September offer the most favorable weather for climbing Mount Callaghan.

== See also ==
- Callaghan Lake Provincial Park
- Callaghan Valley
- Volcanism of Canada
- Volcanism of Western Canada
