= Callahan Creek =

Stream in the U.S. state of Missouri

Callahan Creek is a stream in Boone County in the U.S. state of Missouri. It is a tributary of Perche Creek.

The stream headwaters arise in northwest Boone County just southeast of Harrisburg adjacent to Missouri Route 124 (at 39°08′19″N 92°27′28″W) and it flows south to southeast to its confluence with Perche Creek (at 38°58′51″N 92°24′37″W) about one half mile north of I-70 at the northwest corner of Columbia.

A variant name was Callaham's Creek. The creek's name is a corruption of the last name of William Callaham, a pioneer settler.

== See also ==
- List of rivers of Missouri
