= James Callaghan (disambiguation) =

James Callaghan (1912–2005) served as Prime Minister of the United Kingdom from 1976 to 1979.

James, Jim or Jimmy Callaghan may also refer to:

- Jimmy Callaghan (c. 1902–1979), Australian Aboriginal show ring rider, member of the Aboriginal and Islander Sports Hall of Fame
- James Callaghan (1914–1972), councilman in Newark, New Jersey, see List of United States local officials convicted of federal corruption offenses
- Jim Callaghan (Lancashire politician) (1927–2018), British member of parliament for Heywood and Middleton
- James Callaghan, Scottish football referee in the 1968–69 Scottish Cup
- Jimmy Callaghan, British trucker featured in the TV documentary series Eddie Stobart: Trucks & Trailers

== See also ==
- James O'Callaghan (1743–1836), Irish politician
- Jim O'Callaghan (born 1968), Irish politician
- James Callahan (disambiguation)
