= Dennis Callahan =

American politician (1941–2012)

Dennis Michael Callahan
- Born: September 3, 1941; Baltimore, Maryland, United States
- Died: February 8, 2012 (70 years); Anne Arundel Medical Center
- Known for: Mayor of Annapolis; Anne Arundel County Director of Recreation and Parks

Dennis Michael Callahan (September 3, 1941 – February 8, 2012) was an American politician from Annapolis, Maryland. A native of Baltimore, Callahan was mayor of Annapolis and director of the Recreation and Parks Department of Anne Arundel County, Maryland. He ran unsuccessfully in the Democratic primary for Anne Arundel County Executive in 2006. The general election winner, Republican John R. Leopold, appointed Callahan chief administrative officer of Anne Arundel County, a position he held at the time of his death.

== Career in Parks and Recreation Department ==
As director of the Recreation and Parks Department, he was at the center of two controversial park developments. One of the park developments involved the Smith Farm on the Broadneck Peninsula. The plan called for tearing down most of a horse farm and building ball fields over the land, leaving limited space for a community equestrian center. Local citizens organized against this proposal, and groups such as WHOA (We Hold Officials Accountable), SACReD (South Arundel Citizens for Responsible Development), and the Anne Arundel Green Party literally stood in front of the bulldozers to stop the farm from being torn down. Eventually the farm was preserved and is now the Andy Smith Equestrian Center.

The other controversy entailed converting a substantial portion of wetlands on Franklin Point into ball fields and parking lots. The local community organized against the proposal, offering alternate sites for the ball fields. However, it was only after the Critical Area Commission ruled that plans for the park would have to be severely curtailed that Anne Arundel County backed out of the proposed development. Callahan stated that the new offer would "fundamentally change the character of the plan, substantially reduce the number of park activities available to the Shady Side community and the public, and make development of certain park features problematical or perhaps impossible." This ended 5 years of negotiations between county and state officials.

During Callahan's tenure as the Recreation and Parks Director, football commissioners throughout the County petitioned the County Executive to have him removed from his position. On September 15, 2002, a fight broke out in the parking lot between the two competing football teams, the Cape St. Claire Cougars and Riviera Beach Buccaneers. During the incident, assistant coach Mike T. Pivec, 52, allegedly hit Rory Fracasse Jr., 15, in the face. The head coaches of both teams were put on two game suspensions. Cape St. Claire's Michael Harris, appealed the decision to county recreation officials under Callahans supervision. The officials lifted the two-game suspension, however "members of the football association said that Callahan, who is a friend of Harris, intervened in the appeals process." They later petitioned to have him removed from the position, but were unsuccessful.

== Political career ==
Callahan was a mayor of Annapolis, serving from 1985 to 1989. He was originally a Republican before serving as mayor. He was defeated in the 1989 mayoral primary. He ran again for mayor in 1993 as an Independent, placing second in the general election. Callahan was again the Democratic nominee for mayor in 1997. He was also an unsuccessful candidate for the Democratic nomination for Anne Arundel County Executive in 1990 and 2006.

== Tenure as CEO ==
Callahan served as CEO of the P.O.I.N.T. Corp., which owned Chiro-Serve. After two years under his leadership, the P.O.I.N.T. Corp. and Chiro-Serve went under in 1996.

== Death ==
Callahan suffered a heart attack at his home on February 8, 2012, and died later that morning at Anne Arundel Medical Center. He was 70 years old.

Political offices
Preceded by Richard Lazer Hillman	Mayor of Annapolis; 1985–1989	Succeeded by Alfred Hopkins
