= Ó Ceallacháin =

Irish language surname

Ó Ceallacháin, primarily anglicised O'Callaghan as well as variants of Callihan, is an Irish surname. Notable people with the surname include:

- Pat O'Callaghan (1906–1991), Irish hammer-thrower
- Seán Óg Ó Ceallacháin (1923–2013), journalist, author and broadcaster
- Bill Callihan (1916–1986), American football player
- Davey Callihan (b. 1989), American racing driver
- Deby Callihan, American poker player
- Mike Callihan (b. 1947), Lieutenant Governor of Colorado
- Richard Callihan (b. 1961), American racing driver
- Sami Callihan (b. 1987), American wrestler
- Tyler Callihan (b. 2000), American baseball player
- Nial Callaghan (b. 1988), English footballer

== See also ==
- Callahan (disambiguation)
- Callaghan (disambiguation)
