= Callaghan Valley =

Valley in British Columbia, Canada

Coordinates: 50°08′13″N 123°09′07″W

The Callaghan Valley is located in the Sea to Sky Country of southwestern, British Columbia, in the Pacific Ranges of the Coast Mountains 90 km north of Vancouver. It was the home of the 2010 Winter Olympics's Whistler Olympic Park, the venue for the Nordic events of the Olympics, and adventure tourism operations including Canadian Wilderness Adventures.

== Geography ==
The valley is the basin of Callaghan Creek, at the head of which is Callaghan Lake and associated provincial park. Midway down Callaghan Creek is the confluence of Madeley Creek, just above which on that creek is Alexander Falls, which lies just at a bridge on the road to Callaghan Lake.

On its western perimeter is the Powder Mountain Icefield, and the potentially active volcano Mount Cayley, which lies at the valley's southwestern extremity. Mount Callaghan, at the head of the valley, is a dormant volcano because its last eruption was not as recent as Mount Cayley's, nor does it display hot spring or seismic activity. The valley's eastern wall is the small range formed by Mount Sproatt and Rainbow Mountain, which lies in the angle of the Cheakamus River and Callaghan Creek (which in the past has also been known as the West Fork of the Cheakamus) and east of which is the Resort Municipality of Whistler. The valley's mouth and road access is at McGuire's on BC Highway 99, 14 kilometres south of downtown Whistler, in British Columbia. The location is also known as Northair, and the road as the Northair Mine Road, after a mine located a few miles north of the junction, which is marked by a quarry pit columnar basalt lava rock on the opposite side of the highway, and which are the northern end of a small lava plateau between the highway and river south to and including Brandywine Falls. Volcanoes in the Callaghan Valley were erupted between 25,000 and 11,000 years ago whose age is extremely young in the geologic record.

== Development history ==
The Callaghan Valley is a unique microclimate surrounded by a circular rampart of five mountains. Recent commercial snow sports developments have completely altered this ecosystem and these changes are increasingly having an impact on it.

== See also ==
- Mount Cayley volcanic field
