= 1983–84 FA Cup qualifying rounds =

Tournament details
- Country: England; Wales

The FA Cup 1983–84 is the 103rd season of the world's oldest football knockout competition; The Football Association Challenge Cup, or FA Cup for short. The large number of clubs entering the tournament from lower down the English football league system meant that the competition started with a number of preliminary and qualifying rounds. The 28 victorious teams from the fourth round qualifying progressed to the first round proper.

== Preliminary round ==
=== Ties ===
Tie	Home team	Score	Away team
1	Accrington Stanley	3–1	Crook Town
2	Alfreton Town	0–1	Ashton United
3	Ampthill Town	2–1	Rushden Town
4	Aylesbury United	2–0	Harefield United
5	Barry Town	4–1	Calne Town
6	Beckenham Town	1–3	Ashford Town (Kent)
7	Belper Town	3–3	Bilston
8	Blakenall	0–1	Buckingham Town
9	Boldmere St Michaels	0–2	Dudley Town
10	Boston	1–3	Gresley Rovers
11	Bourne Town	4–2	Chipping Norton Town
12	Brigg Town	0–0	Hednesford Town
13	Bristol Manor Farm	0–1	Glastonbury
14	Brockenhurst	1–1	Clandown
15	Burnham	2–0	Bracknell Town
16	Bury Town	3–3	Tiptree United
17	Chadderton	1–0	Denaby United
18	Chalfont St Peter	2–1	Finchley
19	Chard Town	2–1	Taunton Town
20	Chertsey Town	0–1	Peacehaven & Telscombe
21	Chester-Le-Street	2–0	Shildon
22	Clapton	2–3	Cray Wanderers
23	Colwyn Bay	2–3	Emley
24	Congleton Town	1–0	Caernarfon Town
25	Dorking	1–0	Berkhamsted Town
26	Droylsden	1–2	Prestwich Heys
27	Durham City	3–1	Ashington
28	Easington Colliery	2–0	Whitley Bay
29	Eastbourne United	1–0	Arundel
30	Eastwood Hanley	1–0	Desborough Town
31	Ely City	3–2	Armitage
32	Falmouth Town	0–1	Bridgwater Town
33	Fleetwood Town	2–1	Blue Star
34	Formby	2–1	North Ferriby United
35	Gretna	3–1	Consett
36	Guisborough Town	2–1	Ferryhill Athletic
37	Hailsham Town	2–1	Woking
38	Haringey Borough	1–4	Canterbury City
39	Haverfordwest County	1–0	Weston Super Mare
40	Highgate United	1–2	Bridgnorth Town
41	Hoddesdon Town	1–0	Merstham
42	Hornchurch	1–0	Crawley Town
43	Horsham	0–0	Burgess Hill Town
44	Kingsbury Town	0–1	Addlestone & Weybridge Town
45	Lancing	3–1	Faversham Town
46	Lewes	2–2	Tunbridge Wells
47	Llanelli	3–0	Clevedon Town
48	Lowestoft Town	2–0	Letchworth Garden City
49	Lye Town	1–0	Willenhall Town
50	Mangotsfield United	3–1	Ton Pentre
51	March Town United	3–2	Bromsgrove Rovers
52	Metropolitan Police	0–1	Horsham Y M C A
53	Molesey	0–2	Erith & Belvedere
54	Newbury Town	4–2	Devizes Town
55	Paulton Rovers	2–1	Wellington (Somerset)
56	Peterlee Newtown	3–0	Netherfield
57	Prescot Cables	0–0	Lytham
58	R S Southampton	4–1	Oxford City
59	Racing Club Warwick	3–1	Banbury United
60	Radcliffe Borough	2–1	Ossett Albion
61	Ringmer	0–3	Sittingbourne
62	Romsey Town	1–1	Chippenham Town
63	Rothwell Town	2–0	Newmarket Town
64	Royston Town	4–1	Epping Town
65	Ryhope Community Association	1–3	Harrogate Town
66	Salisbury	1–0	Flackwell Heath
67	Saltash United	3–1	Barnstaple Town
68	Seaham Colliery Welfare Red Star	7–0	Bridlington Trinity
69	Skegness Town	2–4	Tividale
70	Soham Town Rangers	1–0	Harwich & Parkeston
71	St Albans City	10–0	Banstead Athletic
72	Stevenage Borough	2–0	Milton Keynes City
73	Stowmarket	1–0	Cheshunt
74	Three Bridges	3–2	Hemel Hempstead
75	Tonbridge	3–0	Marlow
76	Walton & Hersham	1–1	Fleet Town
77	Warrington Town	0–3	Stalybridge Celtic
78	Whitehawk	3–0	Horndean
79	Wick	2–1	Newport I O W
80	Wigston Fields	3–1	Coventry Sporting
81	Winterton Rangers	1–0	Friar Lane Old Boys
82	Wootton Blue Cross	1–1	Basildon United
83	Wren Rovers	3–2	Appleby Frodingham

=== Replays ===
Tie	Home team	Score	Away team
7	Bilston	1–0	Belper Town
12	Hednesford Town	3–0	Brigg Town
14	Clandown	3–0	Brockenhurst
16	Tiptree United	0–1	Bury Town
43	Burgess Hill Town	0–2	Horsham
46	Tunbridge Wells	0–3	Lewes
57	Lytham	0–3	Prescot Cables
62	Chippenham Town	0–1	Romsey Town
76	Fleet Town	0–4	Walton & Hersham
82	Basildon United	2–0	Wootton Blue Cross

== 1st qualifying round ==
=== Ties ===
Tie	Home team	Score	Away team
1	Abingdon Town	0–3	Wokingham Town
2	Addlestone & Weybridge Town	3–1	Cray Wanderers
3	Andover	1–3	A F C Totton
4	Arnold	1–2	Bilston
5	Ashford Town (Kent)	5–0	Deal Town
6	Ashton United	0–1	Runcorn
7	Aylesbury United	2–0	Boreham Wood
8	Barry Town	2–0	Chard Town
9	Barton Rovers	0–1	Kidderminster Harriers
10	Basildon United	3–1	Leytonstone Ilford
11	Basingstoke Town	2–1	Llanelli
12	Bath City	4–0	Shepton Mallet Town
13	Bedworth United	3–2	Dunstable
14	Billericay Town	3–0	Thetford Town
15	Billingham Synthonia	0–1	Lancaster City
16	Bishop Auckland	2–2	Thackley
17	Bootle	0–1	Bangor City
18	Bourne Town	1–4	Shifnal Town
19	Brandon United	0–0	Guisborough Town
20	Bridgend Town	1–0	Redditch United
21	Bromley	3–1	Horley Town
22	Burnham	1–2	Hitchin Town
23	Bury Town	0–2	V S Rugby
24	Buxton	2–1	Curzon Ashton
25	Cambridge City	1–2	Wealdstone
26	Canterbury City	0–3	Bognor Regis Town
27	Chadderton	1–4	South Liverpool
28	Chatham Town	1–2	Epsom & Ewell
29	Chatteris Town	0–2	Wellingborough Town
30	Chelmsford City	5–1	Gorleston
31	Chester-Le-Street	1–0	Barrow
32	Chichester City	1–2	Tonbridge
33	Chorley	2–0	Burscough
34	Cinderford Town	1–2	Merthyr Tydfil
35	Clandown	4–2	Trowbridge Town
36	Clitheroe	0–0	South Bank
37	Coleshill Town	1–3	Gresley Rovers
38	Corinthian-Casuals	2–0	Camberley Town
39	Dorchester Town	0–0	Eastleigh
40	Dorking	1–1	Hendon
41	Dover Athletic	1–4	Lewes
42	Dudley Town	3–1	Irthlingborough Diamonds
43	Dulwich Hamlet	5–0	Ramsgate
44	Easington Colliery	2–1	Peterlee Newtown
45	Eastbourne Town	0–1	Hailsham Town
46	Eastwood Hanley	0–2	Leicester United
47	Edgware	0–5	Windsor & Eton
48	Egham Town	2–1	Sheppey United
49	Eppleton Colliery Welfare	0–2	Durham City
50	Evenwood Town	0–3	North Shields
51	Fareham Town	1–1	Maidenhead United
52	Farsley Celtic	1–4	Horwich R M I
53	Felixstowe Town	3–1	Rainham Town
54	Feltham	0–1	Whyteleafe
55	Fleetwood Town	1–2	Tow Law Town
56	Forest Green Rovers	6–0	Wimborne Town
57	Frome Town	1–1	Torrington
58	Gainsborough Trinity	6–0	Ilkeston Town
59	Glastonbury	0–0	Cheltenham Town
60	Great Yarmouth Town	3–1	Holbeach United
61	Gretna	1–0	Annfield Plain
62	Halesowen Town	6–0	King's Lynn
63	Harrogate Town	2–4	Whitby Town
64	Harrow Borough	9–0	Ware
65	Hastings Town	3–4	Tooting & Mitcham United
66	Haverfordwest County	1–2	Gloucester City
67	Haverhill Rovers	0–1	Lowestoft Town
68	Hayes	1–3	Wembley
69	Haywards Heath	2–6	Folkestone
70	Hednesford Town	1–2	Frickley Athletic
71	Herne Bay	1–3	Gravesend & Northfleet
72	Hertford Town	1–1	Horsham Y M C A
73	Heybridge Swifts	1–0	Soham Town Rangers
74	Hillingdon	2–1	Erith & Belvedere
75	Hinckley Athletic	0–1	Shepshed Charterhouse
76	Hoddesdon Town	0–4	Dartford
77	Horden Colliery Welfare	5–1	West Auckland Town
78	Hornchurch	3–2	Tring Town
79	Hounslow	0–3	Slough Town
80	Hungerford Town	2–1	Newbury Town
81	Hyde United	3–0	Darwen
82	Kingstonian	2–0	Steyning Town
83	Lancing	2–2	Hastings United
84	Leek Town	1–1	Goole Town
85	Leyland Motors	1–3	Congleton Town
86	Leyton Wingate	1–2	St Albans City
87	Littlehampton Town	0–2	Leatherhead
88	Long Eaton United	1–1	Lye Town
89	Mangotsfield United	4–0	Melksham Town
90	Marine	3–2	Heanor Town
91	Matlock Town	2–2	Winsford United
92	Mile Oak Rovers	0–1	Corby Town
93	Morecambe	1–0	Guiseley
94	Nantwich Town	1–1	Emley
95	Nuneaton Borough	1–2	Oldbury United
96	Peacehaven & Telscombe	0–3	Fisher Athletic
97	Prescot Cables	0–5	Rhyl
98	R S Southampton	0–0	Waterlooville
99	Racing Club Warwick	2–2	Alvechurch
100	Radcliffe Borough	1–3	Southport
101	Redhill	1–1	Eastbourne United
102	Romsey Town	0–2	Gosport Borough
103	Rothwell Town	1–5	Burton Albion
104	Royston Town	1–7	Hampton
105	Rushall Olympic	1–1	Grantham
106	Saffron Walden Town	3–0	Stowmarket
107	Saltash United	0–1	Poole Town
108	Seaham Colliery Welfare Red Star	1–3	Gateshead
109	Sholing Sports	2–1	Salisbury
110	Sittingbourne	1–1	Horsham
111	Southall	3–3	Carshalton Athletic
112	Southwick	1–2	Worthing
113	St Blazey	3–1	Bridgwater Town
114	St Helens Town	0–1	Prestwich Heys
115	Staines Town	1–0	Grays Athletic
116	Stalybridge Celtic	8–1	Formby
117	Stevenage Borough	0–0	Moor Green
118	Stourbridge	2–1	Stamford
119	Sudbury Town	1–1	Walthamstow Avenue
120	Sutton Coldfield Town	2–1	Spalding United
121	Sutton Town	0–2	Bridgnorth Town
122	Tamworth	1–6	Macclesfield Town
123	Thame United	2–1	Ampthill Town
124	Thanet United	1–1	Pagham
125	Three Bridges	5–1	Croydon
126	Tilbury	0–1	Chesham United
127	Tiverton Town	1–6	Bideford
128	Tividale	0–5	A P Leamington
129	Uxbridge	4–2	Chalfont St Peter
130	Walsall Borough	1–2	March Town United
131	Walton & Hersham	1–0	Welling United
132	Wednesfield Social	4–0	Ely City
133	Welton Rovers	2–0	Paulton Rovers
134	Whitstable Town	1–2	Whitehawk
135	Wick	1–2	Farnborough Town
136	Wigston Fields	1–4	Buckingham Town
137	Willington	1–1	Accrington Stanley
138	Winterton Rangers	0–3	Eastwood Town
139	Witney Town	2–1	Moreton Town
140	Witton Albion	1–1	Glossop
141	Woodford Town	0–2	Aveley
142	Worksop Town	1–2	Wisbech Town
143	Wren Rovers	0–2	Oswestry Town
144	Yorkshire Amateur	4–1	Spennymoor United

=== Replays ===
Tie	Home team	Score	Away team
16	Thackley	1–4	Bishop Auckland
19	Guisborough Town	1–2	Brandon United
36	South Bank	0–0	Clitheroe
39	Eastleigh	0–2	Dorchester Town
40	Hendon	4–1	Dorking
51	Maidenhead United	0–1	Fareham Town
57	Torrington	0–3	Frome Town
59	Cheltenham Town	4–0	Glastonbury
72	Horsham Y M C A	2–2	Hertford Town
83	Hastings United	2–0	Lancing
84	Goole Town	4–0	Leek Town
88	Lye Town	4–3	Long Eaton United
91	Winsford United	2–1	Matlock Town
94	Emley	6–2	Nantwich Town
98	Waterlooville	2–1	R S Southampton
99	Alvechurch	5–1	Racing Club Warwick
101	Eastbourne United	2–1	Redhill
105	Grantham	3–0	Rushall Olympic
110	Horsham	1–2	Sittingbourne
111	Carshalton Athletic	3–4	Southall
117	Moor Green	1–0	Stevenage Borough
119	Walthamstow Avenue	2–0	Sudbury Town
124	Pagham	0–1	Thanet United
137	Accrington Stanley	3–0	Willington
140	Glossop	2–0	Witton Albion

=== 2nd replays ===
Tie	Home team	Score	Away team
36	Clitheroe	1–0	South Bank
72	Hertford Town	2–0	Horsham Y M C A

== 2nd qualifying round ==
=== Ties ===
Tie	Home team	Score	Away team
1	Accrington Stanley	1–1	Gateshead
2	Addlestone & Weybridge Town	2–1	Hendon
3	Aveley	1–1	Wealdstone
4	Barry Town	4–2	Mangotsfield United
5	Basingstoke Town	1–1	Clandown
6	Bath City	0–1	Merthyr Tydfil
7	Bedworth United	2–1	Kidderminster Harriers
8	Billericay Town	2–2	Walthamstow Avenue
9	Bilston	1–1	Frickley Athletic
10	Bishop Auckland	1–0	Clitheroe
11	Brandon United	1–0	Gretna
12	Bridgend Town	0–2	Cheltenham Town
13	Bridgnorth Town	2–1	Leicester United
14	Bromley	0–4	Gravesend & Northfleet
15	Buckingham Town	2–1	Alvechurch
16	Buxton	0–1	Horwich R M I
17	Chelmsford City	4–2	Great Yarmouth Town
18	Chorley	2–4	Bangor City
19	Congleton Town	3–0	Oswestry Town
20	Corinthian-Casuals	3–0	Southall
21	Dorchester Town	0–3	Wokingham Town
22	Dulwich Hamlet	1–2	Folkestone
23	Durham City	1–3	Whitby Town
24	Easington Colliery	0–0	Tow Law Town
25	Eastbourne United	0–0	Hastings United
26	Egham Town	1–5	Leatherhead
27	Emley	1–3	South Liverpool
28	Epsom & Ewell	1–2	Dartford
29	Fareham Town	0–3	A F C Totton
30	Frome Town	0–0	Bideford
31	Gainsborough Trinity	2–0	Grantham
32	Glossop	4–0	Goole Town
33	Gresley Rovers	0–1	Eastwood Town
34	Hailsham Town	1–3	Ashford Town (Kent)
35	Harrow Borough	0–0	Aylesbury United
36	Hertford Town	1–1	Bognor Regis Town
37	Heybridge Swifts	2–2	V S Rugby
38	Hillingdon	0–1	Hitchin Town
39	Horden Colliery Welfare	6–1	Chester-Le-Street
40	Hungerford Town	3–3	Waterlooville
41	Hyde United	3–0	Runcorn
42	Kingstonian	3–2	Worthing
43	Lancaster City	2–2	Yorkshire Amateur
44	Lewes	0–2	Fisher Athletic
45	Lowestoft Town	3–0	Felixstowe Town
46	Lye Town	4–4	A P Leamington
47	March Town United	3–2	Dudley Town
48	Marine	0–3	Macclesfield Town
49	Morecambe	2–2	North Shields
50	Oldbury United	2–0	Halesowen Town
51	Prestwich Heys	0–1	Southport
52	Saffron Walden Town	2–4	Basildon United
53	Sholing Sports	0–0	Gosport Borough
54	Sittingbourne	3–0	Three Bridges
55	St Albans City	3–0	Hornchurch
56	St Blazey	0–3	Poole Town
57	Staines Town	2–2	Windsor & Eton
58	Stalybridge Celtic	2–0	Rhyl
59	Stourbridge	2–3	Wellingborough Town
60	Sutton Coldfield Town	5–4	Shifnal Town
61	Thame United	4–4	Moor Green
62	Thanet United	0–7	Tooting & Mitcham United
63	Tonbridge	1–2	Farnborough Town
64	Uxbridge	0–1	Hampton
65	Wednesfield Social	1–2	Burton Albion
66	Welton Rovers	1–4	Gloucester City
67	Wembley	0–0	Chesham United
68	Whitehawk	4–1	Walton & Hersham
69	Whyteleafe	0–5	Slough Town
70	Winsford United	3–1	Shepshed Charterhouse
71	Wisbech Town	2–2	Corby Town
72	Witney Town	2–2	Forest Green Rovers

=== Replays ===
Tie	Home team	Score	Away team
1	Gateshead	1–2	Accrington Stanley
3	Wealdstone	2–0	Aveley
5	Clandown	0–2	Basingstoke Town
8	Walthamstow Avenue	0–0	Billericay Town
9	Frickley Athletic	2–0	Bilston
24	Tow Law Town	1–1	Easington Colliery
25	Hastings United	1–0	Eastbourne United
30	Bideford	0–2	Frome Town
35	Aylesbury United	1–2	Harrow Borough
36	Bognor Regis Town	2–0	Hertford Town
37	V S Rugby	2–0	Heybridge Swifts
40	Waterlooville	3–0	Hungerford Town
43	Yorkshire Amateur	0–2	Lancaster City
46	A P Leamington	4–0	Lye Town
49	North Shields	4–2	Morecambe
53	Gosport Borough	4–0	Sholing Sports
57	Windsor & Eton	2–0	Staines Town
61	Moor Green	4–2	Thame United
67	Chesham United	3–2	Wembley
71	Corby Town	3–2	Wisbech Town
72	Forest Green Rovers	1–2	Witney Town

=== 2nd replays ===
Tie	Home team	Score	Away team
8	Walthamstow Avenue	2–1	Billericay Town
24	Easington Colliery	1–0	Tow Law Town

== 3rd qualifying round ==
=== Ties ===
Tie	Home team	Score	Away team
1	A F C Totton	1–1	Waterlooville
2	Bangor City	1–0	South Liverpool
3	Bedworth United	2–1	Moor Green
4	Bishop Auckland	4–1	Accrington Stanley
5	Chelmsford City	2–2	V S Rugby
6	Cheltenham Town	3–1	Barry Town
7	Chesham United	0–2	Hitchin Town
8	Corby Town	2–2	A P Leamington
9	Corinthian-Casuals	3–1	Bognor Regis Town
10	Dartford	2–2	Sittingbourne
11	Folkestone	2–0	Hastings United
12	Frome Town	2–3	Poole Town
13	Gainsborough Trinity	1–1	Bridgnorth Town
14	Glossop	2–3	Frickley Athletic
15	Gravesend & Northfleet	1–1	Ashford Town (Kent)
16	Harrow Borough	1–0	Addlestone & Weybridge Town
17	Horden Colliery Welfare	3–2	Easington Colliery
18	Horwich R M I	2–1	Southport
19	Hyde United	2–0	Stalybridge Celtic
20	Kingstonian	2–4	Farnborough Town
21	Lancaster City	2–2	Whitby Town
22	Leatherhead	0–4	Fisher Athletic
23	Macclesfield Town	6–0	Congleton Town
24	Merthyr Tydfil	3–2	Gloucester City
25	North Shields	2–0	Brandon United
26	Oldbury United	0–3	Burton Albion
27	Slough Town	3–2	Hampton
28	Sutton Coldfield Town	2–1	Buckingham Town
29	Tooting & Mitcham United	3–0	Whitehawk
30	Walthamstow Avenue	0–0	Lowestoft Town
31	Wealdstone	3–1	Basildon United
32	Wellingborough Town	1–0	March Town United
33	Windsor & Eton	4–1	St Albans City
34	Winsford United	0–1	Eastwood Town
35	Witney Town	2–2	Basingstoke Town
36	Wokingham Town	2–1	Gosport Borough

=== Replays ===
Tie	Home team	Score	Away team
1	Waterlooville	3–0	A F C Totton
5	V S Rugby	1–2	Chelmsford City
8	A P Leamington	3–0	Corby Town
10	Sittingbourne	1–4	Dartford
13	Bridgnorth Town	1–4	Gainsborough Trinity
15	Ashford Town (Kent)	3–2	Gravesend & Northfleet
21	Whitby Town	7–3	Lancaster City
30	Lowestoft Town	0–2	Walthamstow Avenue
35	Basingstoke Town	2–1	Witney Town

== 4th qualifying round ==
The teams that given byes to this round are Maidstone United, Boston United, Weymouth, Scarborough, Dagenham, Barnet, Worcester City, Kettering Town, Yeovil Town, Stafford Rangers, Wycombe Wanderers, Bishop's Stortford, Sutton United, Mossley, Workington, Minehead, Blyth Spartans, Barking, Harlow Town and Penrith.

=== Ties ===
Tie	Home team	Score	Away team
1	A P Leamington	3–0	Wellingborough Town
2	Bangor City	2–1	Scarborough
3	Barking	3–0	Ashford Town (Kent)
4	Basingstoke Town	1–1	Worcester City
5	Boston United	3–1	Stafford Rangers
6	Chelmsford City	2–1	Bedworth United
7	Corinthian-Casuals	1–0	Merthyr Tydfil
8	Dartford	2–0	Tooting & Mitcham United
9	Eastwood Town	2–2	Wycombe Wanderers
10	Fisher Athletic	1–1	Harrow Borough
11	Folkestone	1–1	Dagenham
12	Frickley Athletic	1–0	North Shields
13	Harlow Town	1–1	Barnet
14	Hitchin Town	0–1	Gainsborough Trinity
15	Horwich R M I	0–0	Macclesfield Town
16	Hyde United	1–1	Blyth Spartans
17	Kettering Town	3–2	Sutton Coldfield Town
18	Maidstone United	1–1	Sutton United
19	Penrith	3–0	Horden Colliery Welfare
20	Poole Town	3–0	Slough Town
21	Walthamstow Avenue	0–0	Burton Albion
22	Waterlooville	3–2	Wokingham Town
23	Wealdstone	1–0	Bishop's Stortford
24	Weymouth	1–1	Farnborough Town
25	Whitby Town	4–2	Bishop Auckland
26	Windsor & Eton	1–0	Cheltenham Town
27	Workington	0–0	Mossley
28	Yeovil Town	2–2	Minehead

=== Replays ===
Tie	Home team	Score	Away team
4	Worcester City	3–1	Basingstoke Town
9	Wycombe Wanderers	2–1	Eastwood Town
10	Harrow Borough	4–2	Fisher Athletic
11	Dagenham	3–0	Folkestone
13	Barnet	5–1	Harlow Town
15	Macclesfield Town	4–3	Horwich R M I
16	Blyth Spartans	2–4	Hyde United
18	Sutton United	1–3	Maidstone United
21	Burton Albion	3–1	Walthamstow Avenue
24	Farnborough Town	3–2	Weymouth
27	Mossley	1–0	Workington
28	Minehead	2–4	Yeovil Town

== 1983–84 FA Cup ==
See 1983-84 FA Cup for details of the rounds from the first round proper onwards.
