= David O'Callaghan (Kerry Gaelic footballer) =

Irish Gaelic footballer

Personal information
- Born: 1987 (age 38–39) Tralee, County Kerry, Ireland

Sport
- Sport: Gaelic football
- Position: Half/Full Forward
Clubs
- Years: Club
- St Pat's, Blennerville
Inter-county
- Years: County
- Kerry
Inter-county titles
- Munster titles: 0
- All-Irelands: 0
- NFL: 0
- All Stars: 0

David O'Callaghan (born 1987) is a Gaelic footballer from Tralee, County Kerry. He played with Kerry at various levels and with his club side St Pat's, Blennerville.

He was only a panel member at minor and under-21 level. During the 2010 league, he was a surprise member of the Kerry panel, playing three games. He later joined the Kerry junior team and won an All-Ireland title in 2012.
