= Callaghan Lake Provincial Park =

Provincial park in British Columbia, Canada

- IUCN category II (national park)
- Location within British Columbia
- Interactive map of Callaghan Lake Provincial Park
- Location: New Westminster Land District, British Columbia, Canada
- Nearest city: Whistler, BC
- Coordinates: 50°12′25″N 123°11′17″W
- Area: 2,691 ha (6,650 acres)
- Established: July 23, 1997
- Governing body: BC Parks

Callaghan Lake Provincial Park is a provincial park in British Columbia, Canada, located in the upper Callaghan Valley to the west of the resort town of Whistler. The dormant volcano Mount Callaghan overlooks the lake on its north side, while just to the south of the park is the sliding events facility for the 2010 Olympics.

Callaghan Lake was to be the site of the base village for a proposed ski resort, Powder Mountain Resort, but the project never went through due to alleged interference by William Vander Zalm and others in the then-Social Credit government.

The park was established in 1997, and expanded in 2000, currently totalling approximately 2,691 hectares.

== External links ==
- Callaghan Lake Provincial Park
