= Bill Callihan =

American football player (1916–1986)

No. 45, 34, 25
- Positions: Running back, offensive tackle

Personal information
- Born: May 15, 1916; Paxton, Nebraska, U.S.
- Died: August 23, 1986 (aged 70); Columbus, Nebraska, U.S.
- Listed height: 6 ft 3 in (1.91 m)
- Listed weight: 217 lb (98 kg)

Career information
- High school: Grand Island (NE)
- College: Nebraska
- NFL draft: 1939: 9th round, 77th overall pick

Career history
- Columbus Bullies (1939); Detroit Lions (1940–1945)

Career NFL statistics
- Rushing yards: 105
- Rushing average: 3.2
- Receptions: 32
- Receiving yards: 387
- Total touchdowns: 5
- Stats at Pro Football Reference

William Earl Callihan (May 15, 1916 – August 23, 1986) was a professional American football running back in the National Football League (NFL). A 9th round selection (77th overall pick) out of Nebraska in the 1939 NFL draft, Callihan played for six seasons for the Detroit Lions (1940–1945).
