= Jack Souther =

American-Canadian geologist, volcanologist, and engineer (1924–2014)

- Born: April 25, 1924; Chicago, Illinois
- Died: June 1, 2014 (aged 90); North Vancouver, British Columbia
- Education: University of British Columbia; Princeton University
- Known for: Studying volcanoes and volcanism
- Awards: Bancroft Award, Royal Society of Canada, 1984; Career Achievement Award, Geological Association of Canada, 1995
- Scientific career
- Fields: Geology, volcanology

Jack Gordon Souther (April 25, 1924 – June 1, 2014) was an American-born Canadian geologist, volcanologist, professor and engineer. He contributed significantly to the early understanding of recent volcanic activity in the Canadian Cordillera. Many of his publications continue to be regarded as classics in their field, even now several decades after they were written.

== Biography ==
Souther was born in Chicago, Illinois, United States on April 25, 1924. As a young child he moved to the U.S. state of Alabama. In his teenage years, Souther relocated with his family to the Canadian province of Alberta at a cattle ranch near the First Nations settlement of Morley. After his family lost the ranch, Souther moved with his family to the mountain town of Banff. Here, he attended Banff High School. In 1945 at the age of 21, Souther graduated as the class president. He was later accepted into a geological engineering program at the University of British Columbia in Vancouver.

He was offered a full scholarship to Princeton University in Princeton, New Jersey, after excelling to such a degree at the University of British Columbia. Consequently, he enrolled in the Ph.D. program for geology. After completing his degree, Souther joined the Geological Survey of Canada (GSC) office in Vancouver and carved out a remarkable career as one of the country's leading authorities on geothermal resources and volcanism in the Canadian Cordillera.

Souther had long been in demand as a public speaker because of his ability to communicate scientific ideas to lay audiences. This included his ability to be a principal in media interviews, a participant in radio and television open-line shows and as a main figure in television broadcasts handling with its scientific concentration.

Souther received the Bancroft Award for "publication, instruction, and research in the earth sciences that have conspicuously contributed to public understanding and appreciation of the subject" from the Royal Society of Canada in 1984. After retiring to the position of emeritus scientist in 1992, Souther began his second career as a ski guide/mountain host at the Whistler Blackcomb ski resort. In 1995, he received the Career Achievement Award in volcanology and igneous petrology by the Geological Association of Canada.

Jack Souther was one of the first members to join the Whistler Naturalists, a society founded in the resort town of Whistler, British Columbia, during the late 1990s. During his time with the society he discussed the geology and natural history of the Whistler area.

Jack Souther died on June 1, 2014, in Lions Gate Hospital, North Vancouver at the age of 90 following a long battle with cancer. He is survived by his wife Betty and their three daughters Anne, Barbara and Janet.

== Scientific research ==
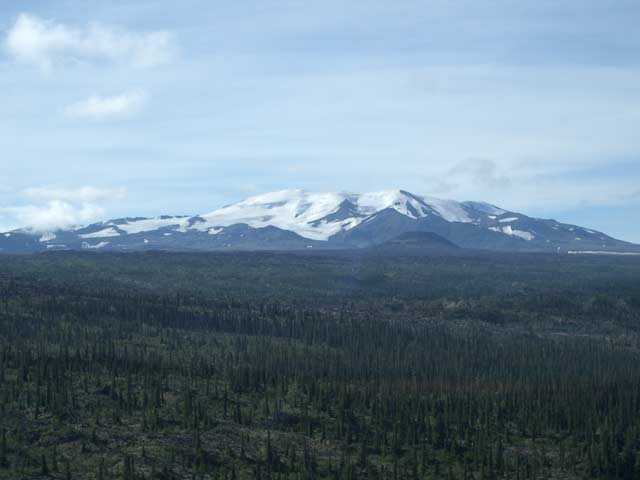
The Mount Edziza volcanic complex was a major focus of Jack Souther's scientific career and was among the subjects of his numerous publications.

Souther's scientific work embraced a broad spectrum of topics, including volcanology, stratigraphy, hydrogeology, landslides, tectonics and mineral deposits. But his most influential work was in the fields of volcanoes and volcanism. When he joined the Geological Survey of Canada, there was a curious gap in the Pacific Ring of Fire between the U.S. states of Alaska and Washington. This began to change in 1956 when the crash mapping program of Operation Stikine identified a number of Cenozoic volcanoes in northwestern British Columbia. Among these were Level Mountain, the Iskut-Unuk River Cones and the Mount Edziza volcanic complex. Masterminded by Jack Souther, Operation Stikine continued to work in the late 1950s and 1960s.

During an expedition of the Canadian Arctic in 1963, Jack Souther observed and named two geological formations. The Strand Fiord Formation on west-central Axel Heiberg Island, Nunavut consists mainly of basaltic lava flows and agglomerates. Souther established a type section for this formation near the western tip of the Kanguk Peninsula. The overlying Kanguk Formation was named after its locality. It comprises dark grey shale and siltstone with subordinate sandstone and some local thin bentonitic and tuffaceous beds.

In 1965, Canadian geologist John Oliver Wheeler foresaw the need for a volcanological program in Canada's western Cordillera. Souther was given the job of working on the Mount Edziza complex with the able assistance of Maurice Lambert. By 1970, the two geologists had established that eruptions of alkali basalt, followed by extrusion of silicic peralkaline lavas, had occurred episodically at Edziza for the past 10 million years and that volcanism was accompanied by east-west extension and incipient rifting. However, the regional tectonic context was still unresolved. During his geological studies in the area Jack Souther named Eve Cone after a local First Nations woman, Eve Brown Edzerza. Edziza remained a significant study area for Souther until his last year of serious field work in 1992. During this year he highlighted the importance and size of the region and proposed that numerous eruptions emplaced lava in a sub-ice or ice-contact environment. This was confirmed by other scientists in 2006.

As part of Operation St. Elias, Jack Souther studied the stratigraphy, structure and evolution of the Wrangell lavas of southwest Yukon in the mid 1970s. He was surprised by the difference in volcanic style between the Wrangell lavas where an enormous volume of andesite lava had issued without any apparent breaks and was accompanied by profound tectonic uplift and compressive folding, in contrast to the episodic eruption of alkaline basalt and highly fractionated silicic peralkaline rocks at Edziza. The differences in eruptive style and chemistry of the Wrangell lavas led Souther to speculate they were related to a calc-alkaline volcanic arc that formed along a converging plate boundary.

In 1977, a book published under the title Volcanic Regimes in Canada included a chapter on Cordilleran tectonics by Jack Souther. This information contributed significantly to the early understanding of Quaternary volcanism in Canada. However, the origins of the east-west trending Anahim Volcanic Belt was still not understood.

Several features in the Mount Cayley volcanic field were illustrated by Jack Souther in 1980, including Mount Cayley, Ember Ridge, Mount Fee, Cauldron Dome, Pali Dome, Slag Hill and Ring Mountain, the later of which he called Crucible Dome. This resulted in the recreation of a geological map that showed the regional terrain and locations of the volcanoes. Souther conducted the first detailed study of Mount Cayley itself during this period. At least three stages of volcanic activity were identified at the volcano. He also hypothesized that the Ember Ridge domes shared a common magma source. However, significant variations in the percentage of phenocrysts in the six domes prove otherwise.

Jack Souther added several hundred Quaternary aged volcanoes on Canadian maps throughout his career. His work contributed to the closing of Canada's gap in the Pacific Ring of Fire.

== Whistler Naturalists Society ==
=== Whistler Mountain ===
Jack Souther described the geology of Whistler Mountain for the Whistler Naturalists Society on May 11, 2001. He speculated that its shale originated as mud on the seafloor of a prehistoric ocean. Granular material, such as clay, sand and silt, was carried into the ancient ocean by rivers that existed during the Cretaceous period. As the Cretaceous rivers continuously sent granular material into the former ocean, it was deposited yearly to eventually form layers of sedimentary material. Once the sedimentary material was compressed, it created the shale that now forms portions of Whistler Mountain.

The most common rocks, andesite and dacite lavas, were said to have been deposited when volcanic activity created a series of islands and lava flows in the ancient ocean. Once the shale and lavas were deposited, they began to deform, crumple and uplift due to the extreme pressures created by movement of the North American Plate and the tectonic plates under the Pacific Ocean. The large masses of solidified lava that formerly created the volcanic island chain and underwater lava flows yielded by demolishing into massive, mountain-sized blocks while the less dense, thinly layered shale was compressed, folded and crushed between the associated lavas. Souther classified these rocks as part of the Gambier Group, a geologic formation that was created within a shallow underwater basin about 100 million years ago during the Early Cretaceous period.

=== Flute and Piccolo summits ===
On August 12, 2004, Jack Souther convinced that Flute Summit is an exposed subvolcanic intrusion of an ancient volcano. The subvolcanic magma heated and set up convention in nearby groundwater, creating a hydrothermal system. This ancient hydrothermal system, combined with sulfurous gasses released from the magma, caused chemical alteration of both the crystallizing subvolcanic intrusion and the adjacent rocks. The weathering of pyrite crystals inside the subvolcanic rock to iron oxide has resulted in the redness of Flute Summit.

The green Piccolo Summit consists of lava flows that Souther speculated to have erupted about 100 million years ago.

== Bibliography ==
=== Books and theses ===
- Duffell, S.; Souther, J. G. (1964). Geology of Terrace map-area, British Columbia. Department of Energy, Mines and Resources.
- Souther, J. G. (1967). Report of Activities, Part A: May to October, 1967. Department of Energy, Mines and Resources. pp. 42, 43.
- Souther, J. G. (1971). Geology and Mineral Deposits of Tulsequah map-area, British Columbia. Department of Energy, Mines and Resources.
- Souther, J. G. (1972). Telegraph Creek map-area, British Columbia. Department of Energy, Mines and Resources.
- Souther, J. G.; Lambert, M. B. (1972). Volcanic Rocks of the Northern Canadian Cordillera. International Geological Congress.
- Souther, J. G.; Symons, D. T. A. (1974). Stratigraphy and Paleomagnetism of Mount Edziza Volcanic Complex, Northwestern British Columbia. Geological Survey of Canada.
- Souther, J. G. (1977). "Volcanism and Tectonic environments in the Canadian Cordillera – a second look". Volcanic Regimes in Canada. Geological Association of Canada. pp. 3–24. ISBN 0-608-17198-0.
- Souther, J. G. (1992). The Late Cenozoic Mount Edziza Volcanic Complex, British Columbia. Geological Survey of Canada. ISBN 0-660-14407-7.
- Souther, J. G.; Weiland, Irene (1993). Current Research, Part A. Geological Survey of Canada. pp. 57–62. ISBN 0-660-57948-0.
- Souther, J. G. (1994). The Ilgachuz Range and Adjacent Parts of the Interior Plateau, British Columbia. Geological Survey of Canada. ISBN 0-660-15500-1.

=== Selected significant articles ===
- Souther, J. G. (1970). "Volcanism and its relationships to recent crustal movements in the Canadian Cordillera". Canadian Journal of Earth Sciences. 7 (2). NRC Research Press: 553–568. Bibcode:1970CaJES...7..553S. doi:10.1139/e70-054.
- Monger, J. W. H.; Souther, J. G.; Gabrielse, H. (1972). "Evolution of the Canadian Cordillera; a plate-tectonic model". American Journal of Science. 272 (7): 577–602. Bibcode:1972AmJS..272..577M. doi:10.2475/ajs.272.7.577.
- Aumento, F.; Souther, J. G. (1973). "Fission-track Dating of Late Tertiary and Quaternary Volcanic Glass from the Mount Edziza Volcano, British Columbia". Canadian Journal of Earth Sciences. 10 (7). NRC Research Press: 1156–1163. Bibcode:1973CaJES..10.1156A. doi:10.1139/e73-099.
- Bevier, Mary Lou; Armstrong, Richard Lee; Souther, J. G. (1979). "Miocene peralkaline volcanism in west-central British Columbia — Its temporal and plate-tectonics setting". Geology. 7 (8). Geological Society of America: 389–392. Bibcode:1979Geo.....7..389B. doi:10.1130/0091-7613(1979)7<389:MPVIWB>2.0.CO;2.
- Clague, J. J.; Souther, J. G. (1982). "The Dusty Creek landslide on Mount Cayley, British Columbia". Canadian Journal of Earth Sciences. 19 (3). NRC Research Press: 524–539. Bibcode:1982CaJES..19..524C. doi:10.1139/e82-043.
- Clark, I. D.; Michel, F. A.; Souther, J. G. (1982). "Isotope hydrogeology and geothermometry of the Mount Meager geothermal area". Canadian Journal of Earth Sciences. 19 (7). NRC Research Press: 1454–1473. Bibcode:1982CaJES..19.1454C. doi:10.1139/e82-126.
- Souther, J. G.; Armstrong, R. L.; Harakal, J. (1984). "Chronology of the peralkaline, late Cenozoic Mount Edziza Volcanic Complex, northern British Columbia, Canada". Geological Society of America Bulletin. 95 (3). Geological Society of America: 337–349. Bibcode:1984GSAB...95..337S. doi:10.1130/0016-7606(1984)95<337:COTPLC>2.0.CO;2.
- Jessop, Alan M.; Souther, J. G.; Lewis, Trevor J.; Judge, A. S. (1984). "Geothermal measurements in northern British Columbia and southern Yukon Territory". Canadian Journal of Earth Sciences. 21 (5). NRC Research Press: 599–608. Bibcode:1984CaJES..21..599J. doi:10.1139/e84-064.
- Hickson, Catherine J.; Souther, J. G. (1984). "Late Cenozoic volcanic rocks of the Clearwater – Wells Gray area, British Columbia". Canadian Journal of Earth Sciences. 21 (3). NRC Research Press: 267–277. Bibcode:1984CaJES..21..267H. doi:10.1139/e84-029.
- Souther, J. G. (1986). "The western Anahim Belt: root zone of a peralkaline magma system". Canadian Journal of Earth Sciences. 23 (6). NRC Research Press: 895–908. Bibcode:1986CaJES..23..895S. doi:10.1139/e86-091.
- Souther, J. G.; Clague, J. J.; Mathews, R. W. (1987). "Nazko cone: a Quaternary volcano in the eastern Anahim Belt". Canadian Journal of Earth Sciences. 24 (12). NRC Research Press: 2477–2485. Bibcode:1987CaJES..24.2477S. doi:10.1139/e87-232.
- Green, Nathan L.; Armstrong, Richard L.; Harakal, J. E.; Souther, J. G.; Read, Peter B. (1988). "Eruptive history and K-Ar geochronology of the late Cenozoic Garibaldi volcanic belt, southwestern British Columbia". Geological Society of America Bulletin. 100 (4). Geological Society of America: 563–579. Bibcode:1988GSAB..100..563G. doi:10.1130/0016-7606(1988)100<0563:EHAKAG>2.3.CO;2.
- Clark, Ian D.; Fritz, Peter; Souther, Jack G. (1989). "Geochemistry and isotope hydrogeology of the Mount Edziza – Mess Creek geothermal area". Canadian Journal of Earth Sciences. 26 (6). NRC Research Press: 1160–1171. Bibcode:1989CaJES..26.1160C. doi:10.1139/e89-099.
- Irving, E.; Souther, J. G.; Baker, J. (1992). "Tertiary extension and tilting in the Queen Charlotte Islands, evidence from dyke swarms and their paleomagnetism". Canadian Journal of Earth Sciences. 29 (9). NRC Research Press: 1878–1898. Bibcode:1992CaJES..29.1878I. doi:10.1139/e92-147.

== Honors and memberships ==
- Bancroft Award, Royal Society of Canada, 1984
- Career Achievement Award, Geological Association of Canada, 1995
- Fellow of the Royal Society of Canada
- Fellow of the Geological Society of America
- Whistler Naturalists Society
- Geological Survey of Canada
- Geological Association of Canada
- American Geophysical Union

== See also ==
- Volcanology of Northern Canada
- Volcanology of Western Canada
- Bill Mathews
