= Powder Mountain (British Columbia) =

Mountain in British Columbia, Canada

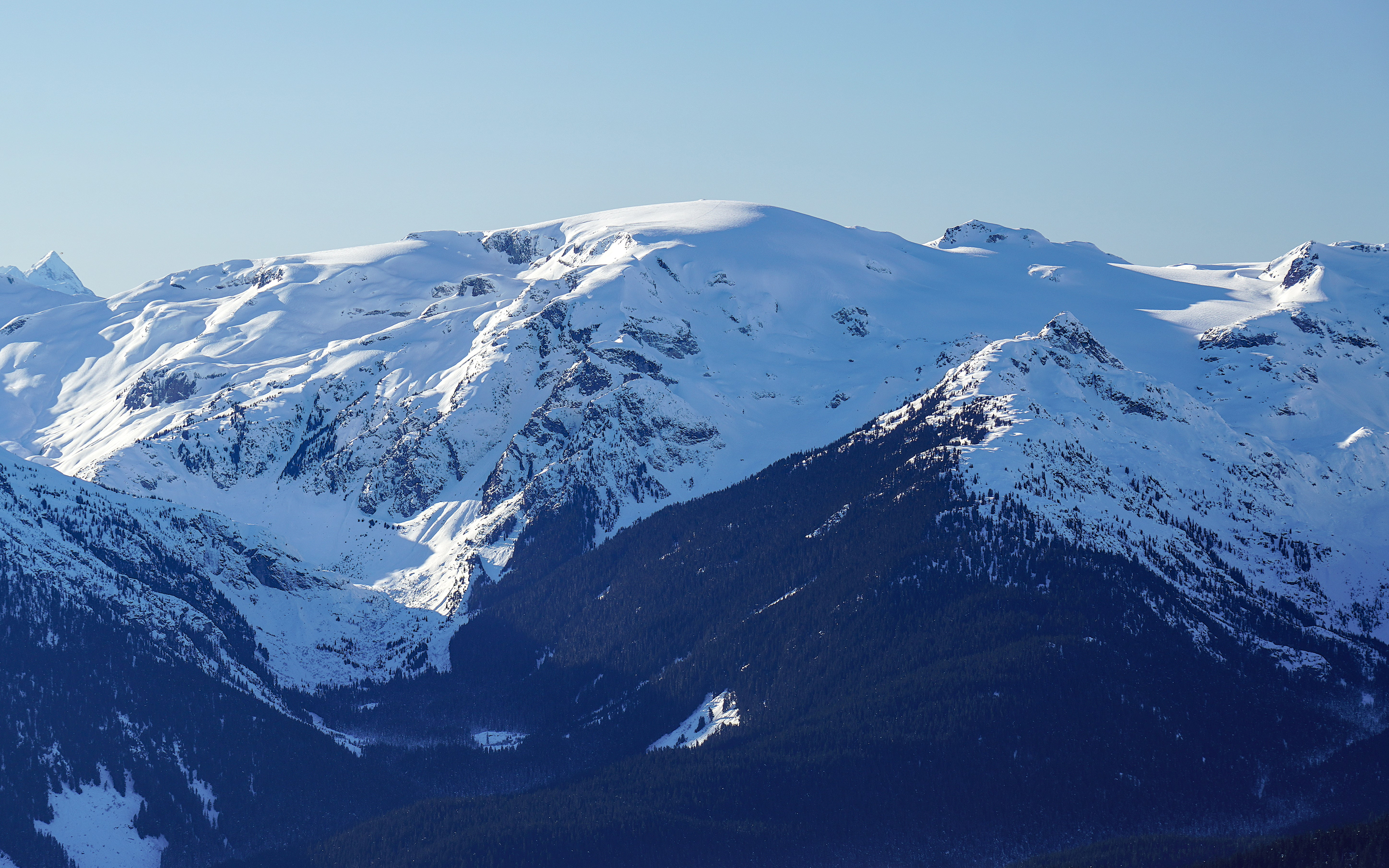
- East aspect in winter

Highest point
- Elevation: 2,347 m (7,700 ft)
- Prominence: 653 m (2,142 ft)
- Parent peak: Mount Cayley
- Coordinates: 50°08′50″N 123°16′36″W

Geography
- Location within British Columbia
- Location: British Columbia, Canada
- District: New Westminster Land District
- Parent range: Pacific Ranges
- Topo map: NTS 92J3 Brandywine Falls

Geology
- Volcanic arc: Cascade Volcanic Arc
- Volcanic belt: Garibaldi Volcanic Belt

Climbing
- Easiest route: glacier walk up

Powder Mountain, 2,347 m (7,700 ft), is a volcanic summit in the Powder Mountain Icefield in the Pacific Ranges of the Coast Mountains in southwestern British Columbia, Canada.

Much of the volcanic history of Powder Mountain remains hidden apart from a few scraps of volcanic rock extending from under its current ice cap.

== See also ==
- List of volcanoes in Canada
- Volcanism of Canada
- Volcanism of Western Canada
- Brandywine Mountain
- Mount Fee
- Callaghan Valley
