= Mount Cayley volcanic field =

Remote volcanic zone in Canada

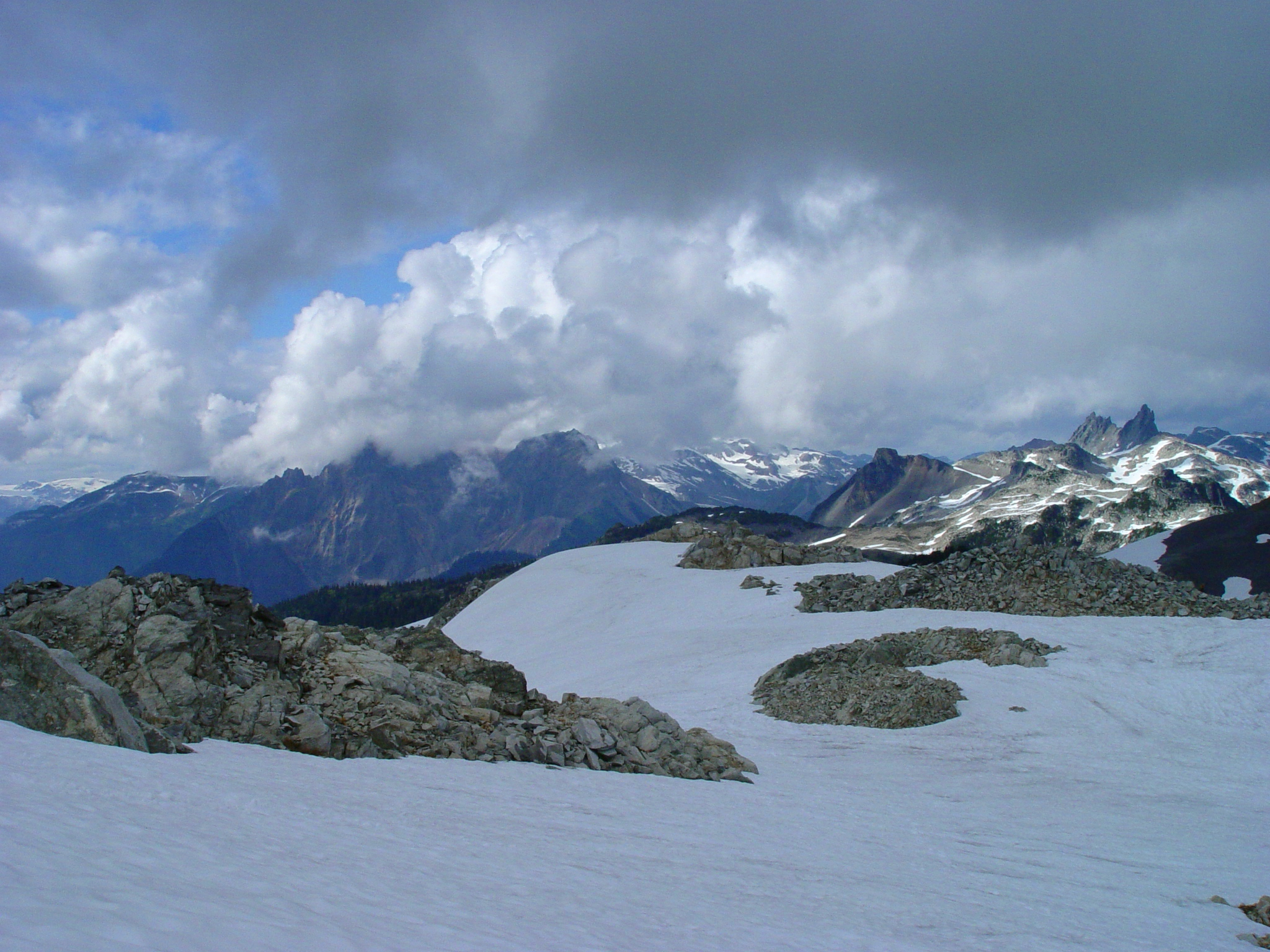
- A view of the MCVF, with Mount Cayley obscured by clouds on the left. Mount Fee is the relatively small jagged peak to the far right.

Highest point
- Peak: Mount Cayley
- Elevation: 2,375 m (7,792 ft)
- Coordinates: 50°07′13″N 123°17′27″W

Geography
- Location in British Columbia
- Country: Canada
- Province: British Columbia
- District: New Westminster Land District
- Topo map: NTS 92J3 Brandywine Falls

Geology
- Rock age: Pliocene-to-Holocene
- Volcanic belt: Garibaldi Volcanic Belt
- Last eruption: Unknown

The Mount Cayley volcanic field (MCVF) is a remote volcanic zone on the South Coast of British Columbia, Canada, stretching 31 kilometres (19 miles) from the Pemberton Icefield to the Squamish River. It forms a segment of the Garibaldi Volcanic Belt, the Canadian portion of the Cascade Volcanic Arc, which extends from Northern California to southwestern British Columbia. Most of the MCVF volcanoes were formed during periods of volcanism under sheets of glacial ice throughout the last glacial period. These subglacial eruptions formed steep, flat-topped volcanoes and subglacial lava domes, most of which have been entirely exposed by deglaciation. However, at least two volcanoes predate the last glacial period and both are highly eroded. The field gets its name from Mount Cayley, a volcanic peak located at the southern end of the Powder Mountain Icefield. This icefield covers much of the central portion of the volcanic field and is one of the several glacial fields in the Pacific Ranges of the Coast Mountains.

Eruptions along the length of the MCVF began between 1.6 and 5.3 million years ago. At least 23 eruptions have occurred throughout its eruptive history. This volcanic activity ranged from effusive to explosive, with magma compositions ranging from basaltic to rhyolitic. Because the MCVF has a high elevation and consists of a cluster of mostly high altitude, non-overlapping volcanoes, subglacial activity is likely to have occurred under less than 800 metres (2,600 feet) of glacial ice. The style of this glaciation promoted meltwater escape during eruptions. The steep profile of the volcanic field and its subglacial landforms support this hypothesis. As a result, volcanic features in the MCVF that interacted with glacial ice lack rocks that display evidence of abundant water during eruption, such as hyaloclastite and pillow lava.

Of the entire volcanic field, the southern portion has the most known volcanoes. Here, at least 11 of them are situated on top of a long narrow mountain ridge and in adjacent river valleys. The central portion contains at least five volcanoes situated at the Powder Mountain Icefield. To the north, two volcanoes form a sparse area of volcanism. Many of these volcanoes were formed between 0.01 and 1.6 million years ago, some of which show evidence of volcanic activity in the last 10,000 years.

== Geology ==
=== Formation ===
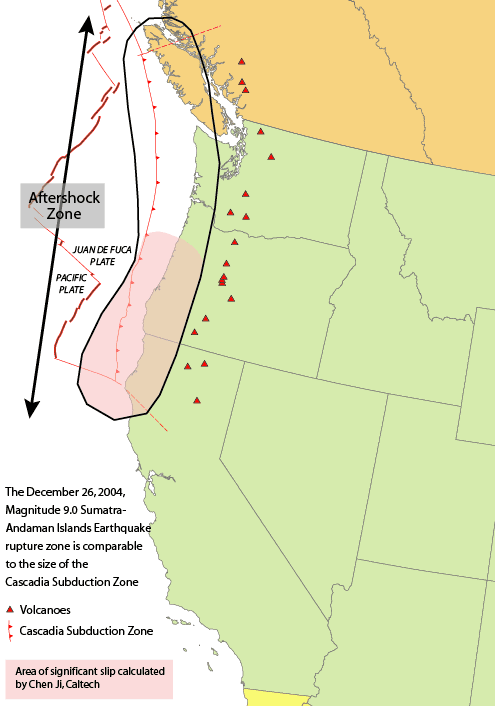
Area of the Cascadia subduction zone, including the Cascade Volcanic Arc (red triangles). The Garibaldi Volcanic Belt is shown here as three red triangles at the northernmost end of the arc.

The MCVF formed as a result of the ongoing subduction of the Juan de Fuca Plate under the North American Plate at the Cascadia subduction zone along the British Columbia Coast. This is a 1,094 km (680 mi) long fault zone running 80 km (50 mi) off the Pacific Northwest from Northern California to southwestern British Columbia. The plates move at a relative rate of over 10 mm (0.39 in) per year at an oblique angle to the subduction zone. Because of the very large fault area, the Cascadia subduction zone can produce large earthquakes of magnitude 7.0 or greater. The interface between the Juan de Fuca and North American plates remains locked for periods of roughly 500 years. During these periods, stress builds up on the interface between the plates and causes uplift of the North American margin. When the plate finally slips, the 500 years of stored energy are released in a massive earthquake.

Unlike most subduction zones worldwide, there is no deep oceanic trench along the continental margin of Cascadia. The reason is that the mouth of the Columbia River empties directly into the subduction zone and deposits silt at the bottom of the Pacific Ocean, burying this large depression. Massive floods from prehistoric Glacial Lake Missoula during the Late Pleistocene also deposited large amounts of sediment into the trench. However, in common with other subduction zones, the outer margin is slowly being compressed, similar to a giant spring. When the stored energy is suddenly released by slippage across the fault at irregular intervals, the Cascadia subduction zone can create very large earthquakes, such as the magnitude 9.0 Cascadia earthquake on January 26, 1700. However, earthquakes along the Cascadia subduction zone are less common than expected and there is evidence of a decline in volcanic activity over the last few million years. The probable explanation lies in the rate of convergence between the Juan de Fuca and North American plates. These two tectonic plates currently converge 3 cm (1.2 in) to 4 cm (1.6 in) per year. This is only about half the rate of convergence from seven million years ago.

Scientists have estimated that there have been at least 13 significant earthquakes along the Cascadia subduction zone in the last 6,000 years. The most recent, the 1700 Cascadia earthquake, was recorded in the oral traditions of the First Nations people on Vancouver Island. It caused considerable tremors and a massive tsunami that traveled across the Pacific Ocean. The significant shaking associated with this earthquake demolished houses of the Cowichan Tribes on Vancouver Island and caused several landslides. Shaking due to this earthquake made it too difficult for the Cowichan people to stand, and the tremors were so lengthy that they were sickened. The tsunami created by the earthquake ultimately devastated a winter village at Pachena Bay, killing all the people that lived there. The 1700 Cascadia earthquake caused near-shore subsidence, submerging marshes and forests on the coast that were later buried under more recent debris.

=== Subglacial volcanoes ===
Lying in the middle of the MCVF is a subglacial volcano named Slag Hill. At least two geological units compose the edifice. Slag Hill itself consists of andesite lava flows and small amounts of pyroclastic rock. Lying on the western portion of Slag Hill is a lava flow that likely erupted less than 10,000 years ago due to the lack of features indicating volcano-ice interactions. The Slag Hill flow-dominated tuya 900 m (3,000 ft) northeast of Slag Hill consists of a flat-topped, steep-sided pile of andesite. It protrudes through remnants of volcanic material erupted from Slag Hill, but it represents a separate volcanic vent due to its geographical appearance. This small subglacial volcano possibly formed between 25,000 and 10,000 years ago throughout the waning stages of the Fraser Glaciation.

Cauldron Dome, a subglacial volcano north of Mount Cayley, lies west of the Powder Mountain Icefield. Like Slag Hill, it is composed of two geological units. Upper Cauldron Dome is a flat-topped, oval-shaped pile of at least five andesite lava flows that resembles a tuya. The five andesite flows are columnar jointed and were likely extruded through glacial ice. The latest volcanic activity might have occurred between 10,000 and 25,000 years ago when this area was still influenced by glacial ice of the Fraser Glaciation. Lower Cauldron Dome, the youngest unit comprising the entire Cauldron Dome subglacial volcano, consists of a flat-topped, steep-sided pile of andesite lava flows 1,800 m (5,900 ft) long and a maximum thickness of 220 m (720 ft). These volcanic rocks were extruded about 10,000 years ago during the waning stages of the Fraser Glaciation from a vent adjacent to upper Cauldron Dome that is currently buried under glacial ice.

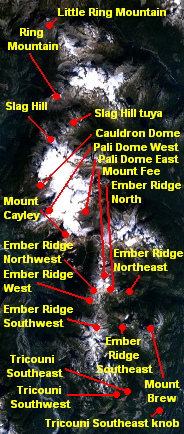
Volcanic features of the MCVF and the ice-covered mountain ridge on which it lies. This image is approximately 35 km (22 mi) north–south.

Ring Mountain, a flow-dominated tuya lying at the northern portion of the MCVF, consists of a pile of at least five andesite lava flows lying on a mountain ridge. Its steep-sided flanks reach heights of 500 m (1,600 ft) and are composed of volcanic rubble. This makes it impossible to measure its exact base elevation or how many lava flows constitute the edifice. With a summit elevation of 2,192 m (7,192 ft), Ring Mountain had its last volcanic activity between 25,000 and 10,000 years ago when the Fraser Glaciation was close to its maximum. Northwest of Ring Mountain lies a minor andesite lava flow. Its chemistry is somewhat unlike other andesite flows comprising Ring Mountain, but it probably erupted from a volcanic vent adjacent to or at Ring Mountain. The part of it that lies higher in elevation contains some features that indicate lava-ice interactions, whereas the lower-elevation portion of it does not. Therefore, this minor lava flow was likely extruded after Ring Mountain formed but when glacial ice covered a broader area than it does to this day, and that the lava flowed beyond the region in which glacial ice existed at that time.

To the north lies Little Ring Mountain, another flow-dominated tuya lying at the northern portion of the MCVF. It consists of a pile of at least three andesite lava flows lying on a mountain ridge. Its steep-sided flanks reach heights of 240 m (790 ft) and are composed of volcanic rubble. This makes it impossible to measure its exact base elevation or how many lava flows comprise the edifice. With a summit elevation of 2,147 m (7,044 ft), Little Ring Mountain had its last volcanic activity between 25,000 and 10,000 years ago when the Fraser Glaciation was close to its maximum.

Ember Ridge, a mountain ridge between Tricouni Peak and Mount Fee, consists of at least eight lava domes composed of andesite. They were likely formed between 25,000 and 10,000 years ago when lava erupted beneath glacial ice of the Fraser Glaciation. Their current structures are comparable to their original forms due to the minimal degree of erosion. As a result, the domes display the shapes and columnar joints typical of subglacial volcanoes. The random shapes of the Ember Ridge domes are the result of erupted lava taking advantage of former ice pockets, eruptions taking place on uneven surfaces, subsidence of the domes during volcanic activity to create rubble and separation of older columnar units during more recent eruptions. The northern dome, known as Ember Ridge North, covers the summit and eastern flank of the mountain ridge. It comprises at least one lava flow that reaches a thickness of 100 m (330 ft), as well as the thinnest columnar units in the MCVF. The small size of the columnar joints indicates that the erupted lava was cooled immediately and are mainly located on the dome's summit. Ember Ridge Northeast, the smallest subglacial dome of Ember Ridge, comprises one lava flow that has a thickness no more than 40 m (130 ft). Ember Ridge Northwest, the most roughly circular subglacial dome, comprises at least one lava flow. Ember Ridge Southeast is the most complex of the Ember Ridge domes, consisting of a series of lava flows with a thickness of 60 m (200 ft). It is also the only Ember Ridge dome that contains large amounts of rubble. Ember Ridge Southwest comprises at least one lava flow that reaches a thickness of 80 m (260 ft). It is the only subglacial dome of Ember Ridge that contains hyaloclastite. Ember Ridge West comprises only one lava flow that reaches a thickness of 60 m (200 ft).

Mount Brew, 18 km (11 mi) southwest of the resort town of Whistler, is a 1,757 m (5,764 ft) high lava dome composed of andesite or dacite that probably formed subglacially between 25,000 and 10,000 years ago. It contains two possible ice-marginal lava flows that have not been studied in detail. They may have formed during the same time period as the Ember Ridge subglacial domes due to their similar structures, columnar joints and compositions.

=== Eroded volcanoes ===
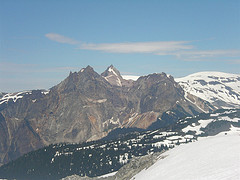
Southwestern flank of Mount Cayley. Its nearly vertical face has been the source for several landslides in the past.

Mount Cayley is the largest and most persistent eruptive centre in the MCVF. It is a highly eroded stratovolcano composed of dacite and rhyodacite lava that was deposited during three phases of volcanic activity. The first eruptive phase began roughly four million years ago with the eruption of dacite lava flows and pyroclastic rock, which resulted in the creation of Mount Cayley. Subsequent volcanism during this volcanic phase constructed a large lava dome. This acts like a volcanic plug and composes the lava spines that form pinnacles on Cayley's rugged summit. After Mount Cayley was constructed, the second phase of volcanism commenced 2.7 ± 0.7 million years ago. This eruptive phase was characterized by the eruption of dacite lava, tephra and breccia, which resulted in the creation of a craggy volcanic ridge known as the Vulcan's Thumb. After prolonged erosion destroyed much of the original stratovolcano, the third and final eruptive phase 0.3 to 0.2 million years ago produced a thick sequence of dacite lava flows. These flows issued from parasitic vents and then travelled through the valleys of Turbid and Shovelnose creeks to near the Squamish River, resulting in the creation of two parasitic lava domes. None of the rocks comprising Mount Cayley show signs of interaction with glacial ice, which contracts with several of the smaller adjacent volcanoes.

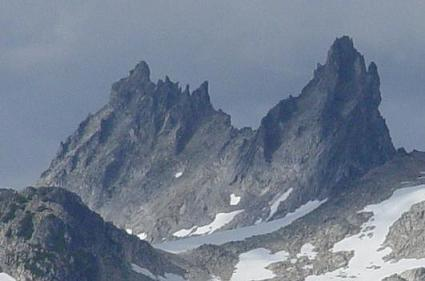
Mount Fee rising above adjacent mountainous terrain. This view of the mountain is from the south.

Immediately southeast of Mount Cayley lies Mount Fee, an extensively eroded volcano. It contains a north–south trending ridge and is one of the older MCVF features. Its volcanic rocks remain undated, but its large degree of dissection, coupled with evidence of glacial ice having overridden the volcano, indicates that it formed more than 75,000 years ago before the Wisconsinan Glaciation. As a result, Mount Fee does not contain evidence of interaction with glacial ice. Three phases of volcanic activity have been identified at Mount Fee. The first eruptive phase deposited pyroclastic rocks, which have since been largely eroded away. These rocks are evidence of explosive volcanism throughout Fee's eruptive history. The second eruptive phase produced a series of lavas and breccias on the eastern flank of the main ridge. These volcanic rocks were likely deposited during the construction of a large volcano. Following extensive dissection, renewed volcanism of the third and final eruptive phase produced a series of viscous lava flows. These form the northern end of the main ridge and its narrow, flat-topped, steep-sided northern limit. This volcanic phase was also followed by a period of extensive erosion and likely one or more glacial periods, which has created the rugged north–south trending ridge that forms a prominent landmark.

Pali Dome, located north and northeast of Mount Cayley, is an eroded volcano in the central MCVF. Like Cauldron Dome, it consists of two geological units. Pali Dome East on the eastern end of the Powder Mountain Icefield consists of andesite lava flows and small amounts of pyroclastic material. Most of the lava flows form gentle topography at high elevations but terminate in finely jointed vertical cliffs at low elevations. Volcanism probably began at least 25,000 years ago but it could have initiated much earlier. The most recent eruptions produced a series of lava flows when the vent area was not covered by glacial ice. However, the flows show evidence of interaction with glacial ice in their lower units, indicating that they were erupted about 10,000 years ago during the waning stages of the Fraser Glaciation. Ice-marginal lava flows at Pali Dome East form cliffs that reach heights of up to 100 m (330 ft). Pali Dome West consists of at least three andesite lava flows and small amounts of pyroclastic material; its vent is presently buried under glacial ice. The age of the oldest lava flow is unknown but it may be at least 10,000 years old. The second lava flow was erupted when the vent area was not buried under glacial ice. However, the flow shows evidence of interaction with glacial ice at lower elevations, implying that it was erupted during the waning stages of the Fraser Glaciation. The third and most recent lava flow was largely erupted above glacial ice but was probably constrained on its northern margin by a small glacier. Unlike the second lava flow, it was not impounded by glacial ice at lower elevations. This suggests that it was produced by an eruption after the Fraser Glaciation, which ended about 10,000 years ago.

=== Lava flows ===
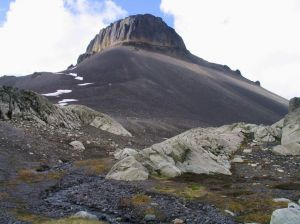
Little Ring Mountain, the northernmost volcano in the MCVF. Like Ring Mountain to the south, the volcano gets its flat-topped, steep-sided structure from when magma intruded and melted a vertical pipe in the overlying Cordilleran Ice Sheet during the last glacial period.

At least two sequences of basaltic andesite lava flows are deposited south of Tricouni Peak. One of these sequences, known as Tricouni Southwest, creates a cliff on the eastern side of a north–south trending channel with a depth of 200 m (660 ft) adjacent to the High Falls Creek mouth. The eastern flank of the lava flow, outside the High Falls Creek channel, has a more constant structure. Several fine-scale columnar joints and the overall structure of the lava flow suggest that its western portion, along the length of the channel, ponded against glacial ice. Near its southern unit, lava oozed into cracks in the glacial ice. This has been identified by the existence of spire-like cooling formations, although many of these edifices have been destroyed by erosional processes. Other features that indicate the lava ponded against glacial ice include its unusually thick structure and its steep cliffs. Therefore, the Tricouni Southwest lava flow was erupted about 10,000 years ago when the regional Fraser Glaciation was retreating. The explanation for the western portion displaying ice-contact features while the eastern portion does not is likely because its western flank lies in a north–south trending channel, which would have been able to maintain smaller amounts of solar heat than its unsheltered eastern flank. As a result, the western portion of the lava flow records glaciation during a period when the eastern slopes were free from glacial ice.

Tricouni Southeast, another volcanic sequence south of Tricouni Peak, consists of at least four andesite or dacite lava flows that outcrop as several small cliffs and bluffs on extensively vegetated flanks. They reach thicknesses of 100 m (330 ft) and contain small amounts of hyaloclastite. The feeder of their origins has not been discovered but is likely located at the summit of the mound. These lavas form ice-marginal edifies, suggesting that every lava flow was erupted about 10,000 years ago when the vast Cordilleran Ice Sheet was retreating and remains of glacial ice were sparse.

Exposed along the Cheakamus River and its tributaries are the Cheakamus Valley basalts. Although not necessarily mapped as part of the MCVF, this sequence of basaltic lava flows is geologically similar and comparable in age to volcanic features that are part of this volcanic field. At least four basaltic flows comprise the sequence and were deposited during periods of volcanic activity from an unknown vent between 0.01 and 1.6 million years ago. Pillow lava is abundant along the bases the flows, some of which are underlain by hyaloclastite breccia. In 1958, Canadian volcanologist Bill Mathews suggested that the lava flows were erupted during periods of subglacial activity and traveled through trenches or tunnels melted in glacial ice of the Fraser Glaciation. Mathews based this on the age of the underlying till, the existence of pillow lava close to the bottom of some lavas, indicating subaqueous volcanism, the columnar jointing at the edges of the lavas, indicating rapid cooling, and the absence of apparent palaeogeography.

=== Petrography ===
Ember Ridge andesite consists of 55% brownish-green volcanic glass with a trachytic matrix of plagioclase. About 35% of this andesite contains phenocrysts of hornblende, augite, plagioclase and orthopyroxene, which exist as isolated crystals and clots. A feature south of Ember Ridge, unofficially known as Betty's Bump, comprises andesite with phenocrysts of plagioclase, augite and olivine. Dark brown volcanic glass composes the Betty's Bump andesite as much as 20%. The relationship of Betty's Bump with Ember Ridge is unclear but it likely represents a separate volcanic feature due to its topographic isolation.

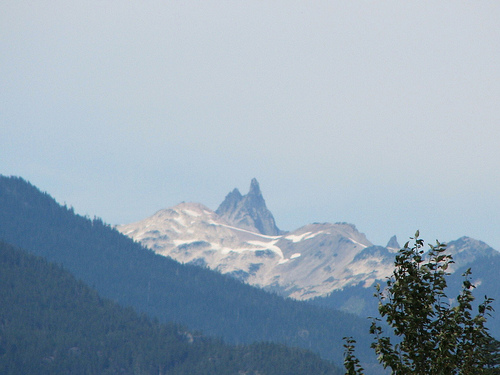
Mount Fee rising over the lightly glaciated dome of Ember Ridge North.

Little Ring Mountain at the northern end of the MCVF contains up to 70% brown volcanic glass with isolated phenocrysts of plagioclase. Vesicular textures are up to 5%, suggesting that the lava erupted subaerially. Possible quartz xenocrysts have been identified at the volcano, with at least one xenolith fragment having been found in loose rubble. The xenolith fragment included several quartz xenocrysts and polycrystalline quartz xenoliths in a glassy matrix with trachytic plagioclase.

Mount Fee dacite contains up to 70% brown volcanic glass and up to 15% vesicular textures. Up to 25% of the dacite contains plagioclase, hornblende, orthopyroxene and orthoclase crystals, along with rare quartz and possible potassium feldspar xenocrysts. A portion of the southwestern flank of Mount Fee displays no volcanic glass, but rather an abnormal cryptocrystalline matrix. This indicates that it may have developed as part of a subvolcanic intrusion.

Ring Mountain andesite consists of up to 70% brown volcanic glass and up to 15% vesicular textures. It contains a trachytic matrix of plagioclase. Augite, biotite, plagioclase and hornblende microphenocrysts comprise 1 to 7% of the andesite. Quartz microxenocrysts are common; potassium feldspar microxenocrysts also possibly occur.

Slag Hill andesite consists of up to 70% dark brown volcanic glass, with the plagioclase matrix displaying varied degrees of trachytic texture. Less than 5% of the andesite has vesicular textures. Plagioclase, hornblende and augite phenocrysts comprise 1 to 10% of the andesite. Potassium feldspar crystals are very rare and likely represent xenocrysts.

=== Geothermal and seismic activity ===
At least four seismic events have occurred at Mount Cayley since 1985 and is the only volcano that has recorded seismic activity in the field. This suggests that the volcano still contains an active magma system, indicating the possibility of future eruptive activity. Although the available data does not allow a clear conclusion, this observation indicates that some volcanoes in the MCVF may be active, with significant potential hazards. This seismic activity correlates both with some of Canada's most youthful volcanoes and with long-lived volcanoes with a history of significant explosive activity, such as Mount Cayley. Recent seismic imaging from Natural Resources Canada employees supported lithoprobe studies in the region of Mount Cayley that created a large reflector interpreted to be a pool of molten rock roughly 15 km (9.3 mi) below the surface. It is estimated to be 3 km (1.9 mi) long and 1 km (0.62 mi) wide with a thickness of less than 1.6 km (0.99 mi). The reflector is understood to be a sill complex associated with the formation of Mount Cayley. However, the available data does not rule out the probability of it being a body of molten rock created by dehydrating of the subducted Juan de Fuca Plate. It is located just beneath the weak lithosphere like those found under subduction zone volcanoes in Japan.

At least five hot springs exist in valleys near Mount Cayley, providing more evidence for magmatic activity. This includes springs found at Shovelnose Creek and Turbid Creek on the southern flank of Mount Cayley and Brandywine Creek on the eastern flank of the MCVF. They are generally found in areas of volcanic activity that are geologically young. As the regional surface water percolates downward through rocks below the MCVF, it reaches areas of high temperatures surrounding an active or recently solidified magma reservoir. Here, the water is heated, becomes less dense and rises back to the surface along fissures or cracks. These features are sometimes referred to as dying volcanoes because they seem to represent the last stage of volcanic activity as the magma at depth cools and hardens.

== Human history ==
=== Occupation ===
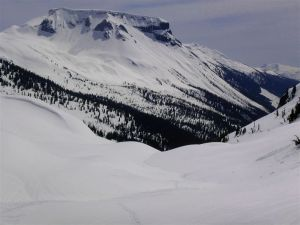
The northern flank of Ring Mountain, a tuya at the northern end of the MCVF. Its flat-topped steep-sided structure has its origins from when magma intruded and melted a vertical pipe in the overlying Cordilleran Ice Sheet during the last glacial period.

Several volcanic features in the MCVF were illustrated by volcanologist Jack Souther in 1980, including Mount Cayley, Cauldron Dome, Slag Hill, Mount Fee, Ember Ridge and Ring Mountain, which was titled Crucible Dome at the time. This resulted in the creation of a geological map that showed the regional terrain and locations of the volcanoes. The most detailed study of Mount Cayley took place during this period. Little Ring Mountain at the northernmost end of the MCVF had not been studied at the time and was not included on Souther's 1980 map. Ember Ridge at the southern end of the MCVF was originally mapped as a cluster of five lava domes. The sixth lava dome, Ember Ridge Northeast, was discovered by Ph.D. student Melanie Kelman during a period of research in 2001.

The hot springs adjacent to Mount Cayley have made the MCVF a target for geothermal exploration. At least 16 geothermal sites have been identified in British Columbia, Mount Cayley being one of the six areas most capable for commercial development. Others include Meager Creek and Pebble Creek near Pemberton, Lakelse Hot Springs near Terrace, Mount Edziza on the Tahltan Highland and the Lillooet Fault Zone between Harrison Lake and the community of Lillooet. Temperatures of 50 °C (122 °F) to more than 100 °C (212 °F) have been measured in shallow boreholes on the southwestern flank of Mount Cayley. However, its severe terrain makes it challenging to develop a proposed 100 megawatt power station in the area.

=== Early impressions ===
The MCVF has been the subject of myths and legends by First Nations. To the Squamish Nation, Mount Cayley is called tak'takmu'yin tl'a in7in'axa7en. In their language it means "Landing Place of the Thunderbird". The Thunderbird is a legendary creature in North American indigenous peoples' history and culture. When the bird flaps its wings, thunder is created, and lightning originates from its eyes. The rocks that make up Mount Cayley were said to have been burnt black by the Thunderbird's lightning. This mountain, like others in the area, is considered sacred because it plays an important part of their history. The Black Tusk, a pinnacle of black volcanic rock on the north shore of Garibaldi Lake to the southeast, sustains the same name. Cultural ceremonial use, hunting, trapping and plant gathering occur around the Mount Garibaldi area, but the most important resource was a lithic material called obsidian. Obsidian is a black volcanic glass used to make knives, chisels, adzes and other sharp tools in pre-contact times. Glassy rhyodacite was also collected from a number of minor outcrops on the flanks of Mount Fee, Mount Callaghan and Mount Cayley. This material appears in goat hunting sites and at the Elaho rockshelter, collectively dated from about 8,000 to 100 years old.

A number of volcanic peaks in the MCVF were named by mountaineers that explored the area in the early 20th century. Mount Fee was named in September 1928 by British mountaineer Tom Fyles after Charles Fee (1865–1927), who was a member of the British Columbia Mountaineering Club in Vancouver at the time. To the northwest, Mount Cayley was named in September 1928 by Tom Fyles after Beverley Cochrane Cayley during a climbing expedition with the Alpine Club of Canada. Cayley was a friend of those in the climbing expedition and had died in Vancouver on June 8, 1928 at the age of 29. Photographs of Mount Cayley were taken by Fyles during the 1928 expedition and were published in the 1931 Canadian Alpine Journal Vol XX.

=== Protection and monitoring ===
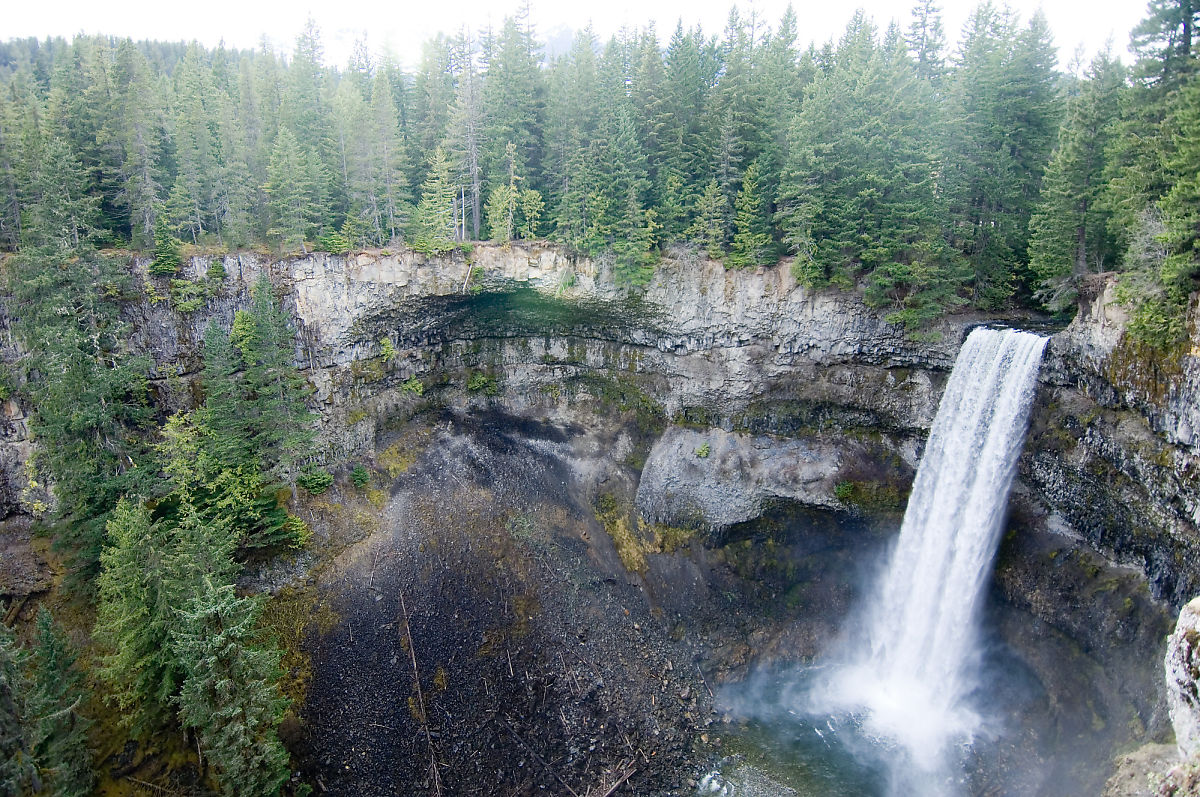
Brandywine Falls and at least three lava flows exposed in the rugged cliffs.

At least one feature in the MCVF is protected as a provincial park. Brandywine Falls Provincial Park at the southeastern end of the field was established to protect Brandywine Falls, a 70 m (230 ft) high waterfall on Brandywine Creek. It is composed of at least four lava flows of the Cheakamus Valley basalts. They are exposed in cliffs compassing the falls with a narrow sequence of gravel lying above the oldest lava unit. These lava flows are interpreted to have been exposed by erosion during a period of catastrophic flooding and the valley these lavas are located in is significantly larger than the river within it. The massive flooding that shaped the valley has been a subject of geological studies by Catherine Hickson and Andree Blais-Stevens. It has been proposed that there could have been significant floods during the waning stages of the last glacial period as drainage in a valley further north was blocked with remnants of glacial ice. Another possible explanation is subglacial eruptions created large amounts of glacial meltwater that scoured the surface of the exposed lava flows.

Like other volcanic zones in the Garibaldi Belt, the MCVF is not monitored closely enough by the Geological Survey of Canada to ascertain its activity level. The Canadian National Seismograph Network has been established to monitor earthquakes throughout Canada, but it is too far away to provide an accurate indication of activity under the MCVF. The seismograph network may sense an increase in seismic activity if the MCVF becomes highly restless, but this may only provide a warning for a large eruption; the system might detect activity only once the MCVF has started erupting. If eruptions were to resume, mechanisms exist to orchestrate relief efforts. The Interagency Volcanic Event Notification Plan was created to outline the notification procedure of some of the main agencies that would respond to an erupting volcano in Canada, an eruption close to the Canada–United States border or any eruption that would affect Canada.

== Volcanic hazards ==
The MCVF is one of the largest volcanic zones in the Garibaldi Belt. Smaller zones include the Garibaldi Lake volcanic field surrounding Garibaldi Lake and the Bridge River Cones on the northern flank of the upper Bridge River. These areas are adjacent to Canada's populated southwest corner where the population of British Columbia is the greatest.

A large volcanic eruption from any volcanoes in the MCVF would have major effects on the Sea-to-Sky Highway and municipalities such as Squamish, Whistler, Pemberton and probably Vancouver. Because of these concerns, the Geological Survey of Canada is planning to create hazard maps and emergency plans for Mount Cayley, as well as for the Mount Meager massif north of the MCVF, which experienced a major volcanic eruption 2,350 years ago similar to the 1980 eruption of Mount St. Helens.

=== Landslides ===
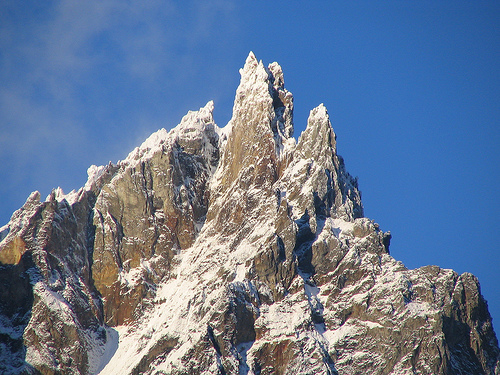
Summit spires of the Vulcan's Thumb. Its craggy structure results from prolonged erosion.

Like many other volcanoes in the Garibaldi Volcanic Belt, Mount Cayley has been the source for several large landslides. Evans (1990) indicated that a number of landslides and debris flows at Mount Cayley in the last 10,000 years may have been caused by volcanic activity. To date, most geological studies of the MCVF have focused on landslide hazards along with geothermal potential. A major debris avalanche about 4,800 years ago deposited 8 km^{2} (3.1 mi^{2}) of volcanic material in the adjacent Squamish valley, which blocked the Squamish River for a long period of time.

A number of smaller landslides have since taken place at Mount Cayley, including one 1,100 years ago and another event 500 years ago. Both landslides blocked the Squamish River and created lakes upstream that lasted for a limited amount of time. In 1968 and 1983, a series of landslides caused considerable damage to logging roads and forest stands, but did not result in any casualties. Future landslides from Mount Cayley and potential damming of the Squamish River are significant geological hazards to the general public, as well as to the economic development in the Squamish valley.

=== Eruptions ===
Eruptive activity in the MCVF is typical of past volcanism elsewhere in the Garibaldi Belt. Earthquakes would occur under the volcanic field weeks to years in advance as molten rock intrudes through Earth's rocky lithosphere. The extent of earthquakes and the local seismographs in this region would warn the Geological Survey of Canada and possibly cause an upgrade in monitoring. While molten rock breaks through the crust, the size of the volcano vulnerable to an eruption would possibly swell and the area would rupture, creating much more hydrothermal activity at the regional hot springs and the formation of new springs or fumaroles. Small and probably large rock avalanches may result and could dam the nearby Squamish River for a short period of time, as has happened in the past without seismic activity or deformation related to magmatic activity. At some point the subsurface magma will produce phreatic eruptions and lahars. At this time Highway 99 would be out of service and the residents of Squamish would have to travel away from the eruptive zone.

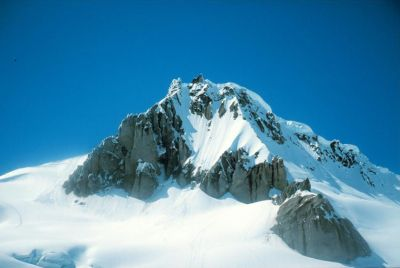
Mount Cayley as seen from its southeastern flank.

As molten rock comes closer to the surface it will most likely cause more fragmentation, triggering an explosive eruption that could produce a 20 km (12 mi) high eruption column. This would endanger air traffic, which would have to take another route away from the eruptive zone. Every airport buried under pyroclastic fall would be out of service, including those in Vancouver, Victoria, Kamloops, Prince George and Seattle. The tephra would destroy power transmission lines, satellite dishes, computers and other equipment that operates on electricity. Therefore, telephones, radios and cell phones would be disconnected. Structures not built for holding heavy material would likely collapse under the weight of the tephra. Ash from the eruption column would subside above the vent area to create pyroclastic flows, which would travel east and west down the nearby Cheakamus and Squamish river valleys. These would have significant impacts on salmon in the associated rivers and would cause considerable melting of glacial ice to produce debris flows, which may extend into Daisy Lake and Squamish to cause additional damage. The eruption column would then travel eastward, interrupting air travel throughout Canada from Alberta to Newfoundland and Labrador.

Explosive eruptions may subside and be followed by the eruption of viscous lava to form a lava dome in the new crater. Precipitation would frequently trigger lahars, which would continuously create problems in the Squamish and Cheakamus river valleys. If the lava dome continues to grow, it would eventually rise above the crater rim. The cooling lava may produce landslides to create a massive zone of blocky talus in the Squamish river valley. As the lava dome continues to grow, it will frequently collapse to create large pyroclastic flows that would again travel down the adjacent Squamish and Cheakamus river valleys. Tephra swept away from the pyroclastic flows would create ash columns with elevations of at least 10 km (6.2 mi), repeatedly depositing tephra on the communities of Whistler and Pemberton and again disrupting regional air traffic. Lava of the unstable dome may occasionally create minor pyroclastic flows, explosions and eruption columns. The community of Squamish would be abandoned, Highway 99 would be out of service and destroyed, and traffic adjacent to Vancouver, Pemberton and Whistler would remain forced to travel a longer route to the east.

Eruptions would likely continue for a period of time, followed by years of decreasing secondary activity. The solidifying lava would occasionally collapse portions of the volcano to create pyroclastic flows. Rubble on the flanks of the volcano and in valleys would occasionally be released to form debris flows. Major construction would be needed to repair the community of Squamish and Highway 99.

== See also ==
- Callaghan Valley
- Geology of British Columbia
- Lillooet Ranges
- List of Cascade volcanoes
- List of volcanoes in Canada
- List of volcanic fields
- Squamish volcanic field
- Volcanism of Western Canada
