= Brandywine Mountain =

Mountain in British Columbia, Canada

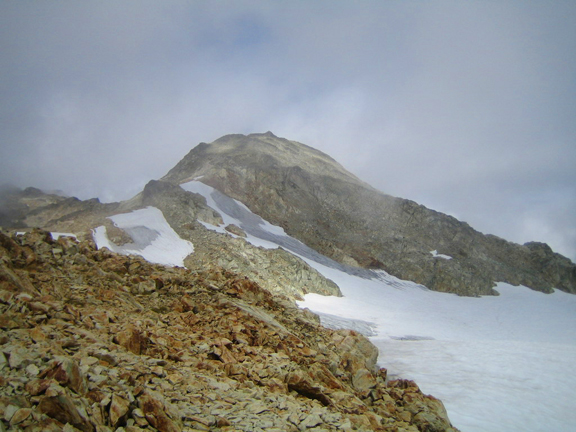
- Brandywine Mountain

Highest point
- Elevation: 2,213 m (7,260 ft)
- Prominence: 428 m (1,404 ft)
- Coordinates: 50°06′52″N 123°13′16″W

Geography
- Location within British Columbia
- Interactive map of Brandywine Mountain
- Location: British Columbia, Canada
- District: New Westminster Land District
- Parent range: Pacific Ranges
- Topo map: NTS 92J3 Brandywine Falls

Brandywine Mountain, 2,213 m or 7,260 ft, is a summit in the Powder Mountain Icefield of the Pacific Ranges of the Coast Mountains of southwestern British Columbia, Canada, about 25 km (16 mi) west of the resort town of Whistler.

Its name is derived from that of Brandywine Falls, which was the result of a bet over the falls' height (with the wagers being a bottle of wine and a bottle of brandy).

== See also ==
- Mount Fee
- Mount Cayley
- Mount Callaghan
- Brandywine Creek
