= Powder Mountain Icefield =

Ice field in British Columbia, Canada

Coordinates: 50°08′48.8″N 123°16′36.1″W

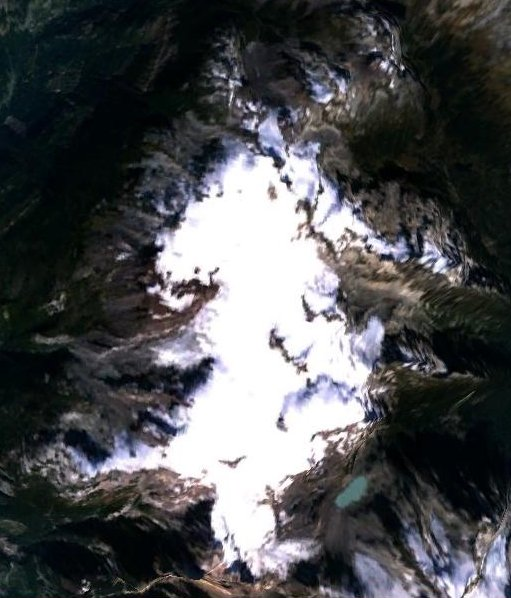
Satellite image of the Powder Mountain Icefield

The Powder Mountain Icefield, also called the Powder Mountain Icecap and the Cayley Icefield, is a glacial field in the Pacific Ranges of southwestern British Columbia, Canada, about 20 kilometres (12 mi) west of Whistler and about 90 kilometres (56 mi) north of Vancouver. On the west side of the icefield is the valley of the Squamish River, while on its east is the Callaghan Valley, which is the setting for the Nordic facilities for the 2010 Winter Olympics.

The icefield is studded by several volcanic formations, including active Mount Cayley. Other summits are Powder Mountain, Brandywine Mountain and Mount Fee. Mount Callaghan, a dormant volcano, is just northeast of the icefield. Mount Brew is just to its south.

== Geology ==
Numerous subglacial eruptions beneath the Powder Mountain Icefield have formed many distinctive subglacial volcanoes in the Mount Cayley volcanic field and contain abundant glass and fine-scale jointing from rapid cooling of lava, such as Ember Ridge and Slag Hill. Mineralogically, the volcanics range from andesite to rhyodacite, and chemically, the rocks span a range from andesite to dacite. Glassy volcanic rocks are abundant, with glass contents as high as 70%. Volcanoes such as the Slag Hill tuya were formed when magma intruded into and melted a vertical pipe in the overlying Powder Mountain Icefield. The partially molten mass cooled as a large block, with gravity flattening its upper surface, forming its flat-topped, steep-sided subglacial volcanic edifice. The latest volcanic activity in the Powder Mountain Icefield has occurred in the past 10,000 years.

== Development proposal ==
The icefield was one of several locations in the southern Coast Mountains that attracted ski resort development interest as a result of the success of the nearby ski resort town at Whistler, British Columbia. A proposal call in 1985 was won by Powder Mountain Resorts, who won approval in principle from the provincial government for its project design, which included a small basetown at Callaghan Lake. In 1987, Forests and Lands Minister Jack Kempf was instructed by then-Premier Bill Vander Zalm to "cease and desist" in favour of Callaghan Resorts Inc., which was backed by then-Attorney-General Les Peterson. Court action for breach of contract and abuse of office taken by Powder Mountain Resort promoters Nan and Dianne Hartwick was dismissed by the Supreme Court of British Columbia in 1999, though in 2000 the British Columbia Court of Appeal refused to overturn the lower court's ruling. An appeal at the Supreme Court of Canada is still pending.

A special prosecutor was appointed but the investigation was halted for lack of evidence in 2003, three weeks before Vancouver and Whistler won the bid to host the 2010 Winter Olympics. In the meantime, a Nordic lodge was founded in the Callaghan Valley in 1998, just prior to the Canadian Olympic Committee's selection of Vancouver over Calgary and Quebec City as the site of the 2010 Olympics bid. The owner of the Nordic lodge was a promoter of using the Callaghan Valley for Olympic ski-jumping, cross-country, biathlon and other Nordic events. Powder Mountain promoters Nan and Dianne Hartwick continue to press for investigation of backroom dealing that led to the shunting-aside of their project and claim connections between members of VANOC, the Vancouver Organizing Committee for the 2010 Olympic and Paralympic Winter Games, and those in the provincial administration who helped quash their project. The province has also issued permits for other operations in the valley, such as cat-skiing and snowmobile tour operations, as well as pushed through permits for construction of the Whistler Olympic Park, which is the site of the games' Nordic events. The Hartwicks' position is that these developments violate the agreement-in-principle they had with the province, which the provincial government had claimed was without sufficient backing.

In 2007, RCMP Commercial Crimes Unit head Kevin deBruyckere confirmed that a review is underway, and which the Hartwicks say is based on new evidence of conflict of interest. The Hartwicks emphasize that they are not anti-Olympics, but that their ultimate goal is only to re-establish their right to complete their resort proposal.

== See also ==
- Volcanism in Canada
- Volcanism in Western Canada
- Garibaldi Volcanic Belt
