= Brandywine Creek (British Columbia) =

Watercourse in British Columbia, Canada

Coordinates: 50°02′00″N 123°07′00″W

Brandywine Creek, also formerly known as the Long John River after a local prospector and trapper, is a tributary of the Cheakamus River in the Pacific Ranges of the Coast Mountains in British Columbia, Canada, entering that stream via Daisy Lake, just below Brandywine Falls. The creek is about 14 km in length and originates on the south slope of Brandywine Mountain in Brandywine Meadows, at the southern end of the Powder Mountain Icefield and is the next basin immediately southwest of that of the Callaghan Valley, the site of the Nordic events facility for the 2010 Olympics. The creek's valley has been partially logged. An unnamed hot spring lies in its upper reaches, near Mount Fee.

== Name ==
The creek's name is derived from that of Brandywine Falls, which earned its name in the course of a wager over its height in which the wagers were a bottle of brandy and a bottle of wine.

== See also ==
- Brandywine Mountain
- Mount Cayley
- Brandywine Creek (disambiguation)
- List of rivers of British Columbia
