= Mount Fee =

Volcanic peak in the country of Canada

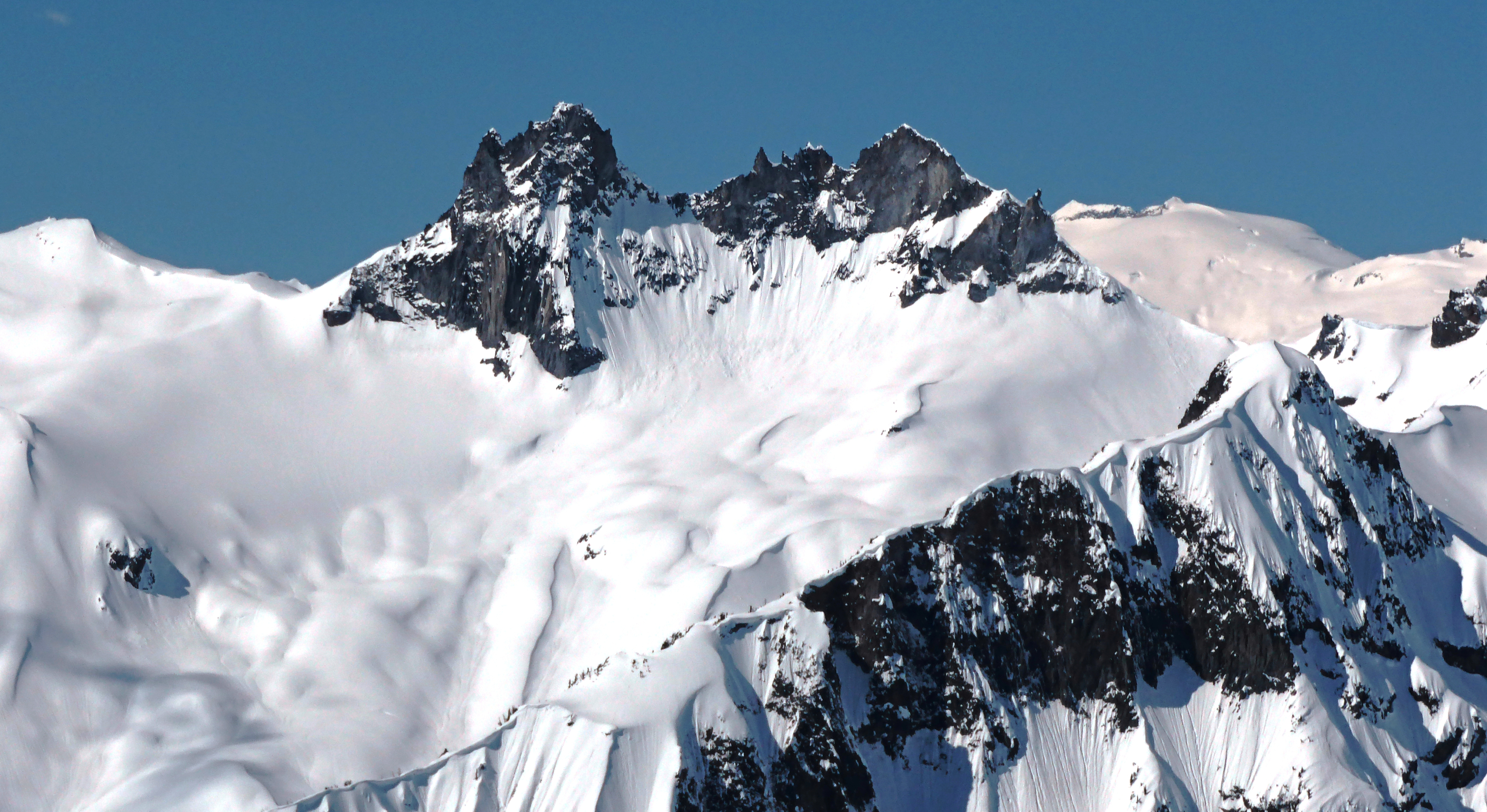
- Mount Fee as seen from Metal Dome

Highest point
- Elevation: 2,162 m (7,093 ft)
- Prominence: 312 m (1,024 ft)
- Coordinates: 50°04′59″N 123°15′00″W

Geography
- Location within British Columbia
- Interactive map of Mount Fee
- Location: Location in British Columbia
- District: New Westminster Land District
- Parent range: Pacific Ranges
- Topo map: NTS 92J3 Brandywine Falls

Geology
- Rock age: Unknown
- Mountain type(s): Eroded volcano, stratovolcano
- Volcanic arc: Canadian Cascade Arc
- Volcanic belt: Garibaldi Volcanic Belt
- Volcanic field: Mount Cayley volcanic field
- Last eruption: Unknown; Pleistocene age

Mount Fee is a volcanic peak in the Pacific Ranges of the Coast Mountains in southwestern British Columbia, Canada. It is located 13 km (8.1 mi) south of Callaghan Lake and 21 km (13 mi) west of the resort town of Whistler. With a summit elevation of 2,162 m (7,093 ft) and a topographic prominence of 312 m (1,024 ft), it rises above the surrounding rugged landscape on an alpine mountain ridge. This mountain ridge represents the base of a north-south trending volcanic field which Mount Fee occupies.

The mountain consists of a narrow north-south trending ridge of fine-grained volcanic rock and small amounts of fragmental material. It is 1.5 km (0.93 mi) long and 0.5 km (0.31 mi) wide with nearly vertical flanks. Mount Fee has two main summits, the southern tower of which is the highest. The summits are separated by a U-shaped crevice that gives them a prominent appearance.

== Geology ==
Mount Fee is one of the southernmost volcanoes in the Mount Cayley volcanic field. This volcanic zone forms the central portion of the larger Garibaldi Volcanic Belt, which extends from the Silverthrone Caldera in the north to the Watts Point volcano in the south. The volcanic belt has formed as a result of ongoing subduction of the Juan de Fuca Plate under the North American Plate at the Cascadia subduction zone along the British Columbia Coast. This is a north-south trending fault zone about 1,000 km (620 mi) long, extending 80 km (50 mi) off the Pacific Northwest from Northern California to southwestern British Columbia. The plates move at a relative rate of over 10 mm (0.39 in) per year at an oblique angle to the subduction zone.

The edifice of Mount Fee is the remains of a volcanic feature that has been significantly eroded by glacial ice. It likely represents a dissected stratovolcano (also known as a composite volcano) that was larger in area and higher in elevation than its current form. Stratovolcanoes can reach heights of 2,500 m (8,000 ft) and consist of alternating layers of lava flows, volcanic ash, cinders, blocks and bombs. During the glacial periods, much of the volcano's original outer cone of pyroclastic material was eroded away by moving layers of ice and rock. The removal of the ejected volcanic material has exposed the dacite lava that forms the narrow north-south trending ridge of Mount Fee. The Black Tusk, a pinnacle of dark volcanic rock to the southeast, is also interpreted to be the remains of a deeply eroded volcano that was once covered with pyroclastic material. The present day edifice of Mount Fee contains several lava spines that reach heights of 100 m (330 ft) to 150 m (490 ft) above the main ridge.

=== Eruptive history ===
Volcanic activity at Mount Fee is among the oldest in the Mount Cayley volcanic field. Its volcanic rocks remain undated, but the large amount of dissection and evidence of glacial ice overriding the volcano indicates that it formed more than 75,000 years ago before the Wisconsinan Glaciation. As a result, the rocks comprising Mount Fee do not display evidence of interaction with glacial ice; the duration of volcanic events is unknown, and the exact timing of eruptive events is unknown. However, a large variety of volcanoes formed subglacially between 25,000 and 10,000 years ago in the vicinity of Mount Fee, including the lava domes of Ember Ridge to the south.

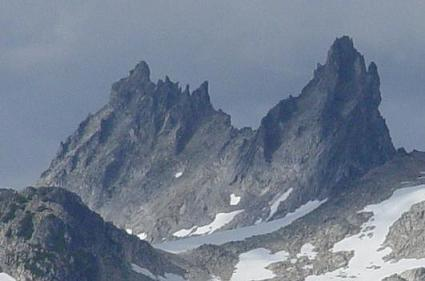
Mount Fee rising above adjacent mountainous terrain. This view of the mountain is from the south.

At least three phases of eruptive activity have been recognized at Mount Fee. The only exposed remnant of Fee's earliest volcanic activity is a minor outcrop of pyroclastic rock. This is evidence of explosive eruptions during Fee's eruptive history, as well as its first volcanic event. The second volcanic event produced a sequence of volcanic rocks on Fee's eastern flank. This volcanic material was likely deposited when a sequence of lava flows and broken lava fragments erupted from a volcanic vent and moved down the flanks during the construction of the ancestral Mount Fee. Following extensive dissection, renewed volcanism produced a viscous series of lavas on its northern flank. The U-shaped crevice separating the two main summits of Mount Fee separates this lava flow from the main volcanic ridge. The conduit from which these lava flows originated was likely vertical in structure and intruded through older rocks deposited during Fee's earlier volcanic events. This volcanic event was also followed by a period of erosion, and likely one or more glacial periods. Extensive erosion following the last volcanic event at Mount Fee has created the rugged north-south trending ridge that currently forms a prominent landmark.

=== Petrography ===
The dacite and rhyodacite rocks comprising Mount Fee contain up to 70% brown volcanic glass and up to 15% vesicles. About 25% of the rocks contain crystal content, including plagioclase, hornblende, orthopyroxene, orthoclase and sporadic quartz. The orthoclase crystals are interpreted to represent rock fragments that became enveloped during hardening of the dacitic lavas. A portion of the southwestern flank of Mount Fee comprises no volcanic glass, but rather composed of an abnormal cryptocrystalline matrix. This indicates that it might have developed as part of a subvolcanic intrusion.

== Human history ==
=== Habitation ===
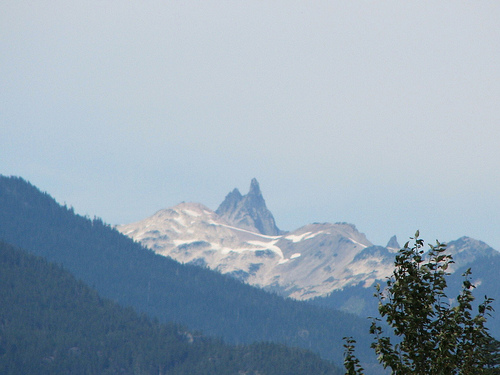
The prominent spine of Mount Fee rising above the lightly glaciated northern subglacial dome of Ember Ridge.

Human habitation at Mount Fee extends from hundreds to thousands of years ago. Glassy volcanic rocks, such as rhyodacite, were widely used to make knives, chisels, adzes and other sharp tools before the arrival of Europeans in the 18th century. It was collected from a number of minor outcrops on the flanks of Mount Fee, as well as at Mount Cayley and Mount Callaghan. This material appears in goat hunting sites and at the Elaho rockshelter, collectively dated from about 100 to 8,000 years ago.

In September 1928, Mount Fee was named by British mountaineer Tom Fyles after Charles Fee (1865–1927), who was a member of the British Columbia Mountaineering Club in Vancouver at the time. Subsequently, Mount Fee was one of the volcanoes in the Mount Cayley volcanic field illustrated by volcanologist Jack Souther in 1980. Others included Mount Cayley, Cauldron Dome, Slag Hill, Ember Ridge and Ring Mountain, which was titled Crucible Dome at the time. Souther created a geological map the following year that displayed the locations of the volcanoes and the regional terrain.

=== Monitoring ===
Like other volcanoes in the Garibaldi Belt, Mount Fee is not monitored closely enough by the Geological Survey of Canada to ascertain how active its magma chamber is. This is partly because no major eruptions have taken place in Canada for over a hundred years and the volcano is located in a remote region. As a result, volcano monitoring is less important than dealing with other natural processes, such as tsunamis, earthquakes and landslides. No recent earthquakes are known to have occurred at Mount Fee. If it were to erupt there would likely be weeks, months or years of warning signs, such as clusters of minor earthquakes that would likely originate less than 15 km (9.3 mi) below the surface. They are generally too small to be felt by people, but the existing network of seismographs has been established to monitor tectonic earthquakes. However, the seismograph network is too far away to provide a good indication of what is happening under the mountain. It may sense an increase in seismic activity if the volcano becomes very restless, but this may only provide a warning for a significant eruption. It might detect activity only once the volcano has started erupting. A significant eruption at Mount Fee would probably have considerable effects, particularly in a region like southwestern British Columbia where the Garibaldi Belt is located in a highly populated area. Because of these concerns, significant support from Canadian university scientists has resulted in the construction of a baseline of knowledge on the state of the Garibaldi volcanoes.

== Climate ==
Based on the Köppen climate classification, Mt. Fee is located in the marine west coast climate zone of western North America. Most weather fronts originate in the Pacific Ocean, and travel east toward the Cascade Range where they are forced upward by the range (Orographic lift), causing them to drop their moisture in the form of rain or snowfall. As a result, the Cascade Mountains experience high precipitation, especially during the winter months in the form of snowfall. Temperatures can drop below −20 °C with wind chill factors below −30 °C. The months July through September offer the most favorable weather for climbing Fee.

== See also ==
- List of Cascade volcanoes
- List of volcanoes in Canada
- Volcanology of Canada
- Volcanology of Western Canada
