= Ring Mountain =

Ring Mountain may refer to:

- Ring Mountain (British Columbia) in British Columbia, Canada
- Ring Mountain (California) in California, USA
- Ring Mountain (Texas) in Texas, USA
- Ring Mountain (Wyoming) in Wyoming, USA
