= Little Ring Mountain =

Mountain in British Columbia, Canada

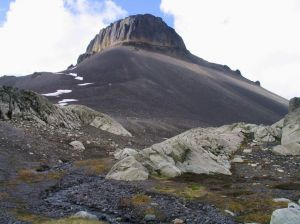

Highest point
- Elevation: 2,165 m (7,103 ft)
- Prominence: 450 m (1,480 ft)
- Listing: List of volcanoes in Canada List of Cascade volcanoes
- Coordinates: 50°16′45.0″N 123°18′56.0″W

Geography
- Location within British Columbia
- Location: British Columbia, Canada
- Parent range: Pacific Ranges
- Topo map: NTS 92J6 Ryan River

Geology
- Mountain type: Tuya
- Volcanic arc: Canadian Cascade Arc
- Volcanic belt: Garibaldi Volcanic Belt
- Volcanic field: Mount Cayley volcanic field

Climbing
- First ascent: 1969 John Clarke

Little Ring Mountain, also called Little Ring Peak, is a tuya in the Pacific Ranges of the Coast Mountains in southwestern British Columbia, Canada. It lies at the head of the Squamish and Soo Rivers. Part of the Mount Cayley volcanic field, its most recent eruption most likely occurred during the Fraser Glaciation.

This peak is so-called because it is similar to the larger and officially named Ring Mountain just to the south.

== See also ==
- List of volcanoes in Canada
- Volcanism of Canada
- Volcanism of Western Canada
