= Pyroclastic Peak =

Mountain in British Columbia, Canada

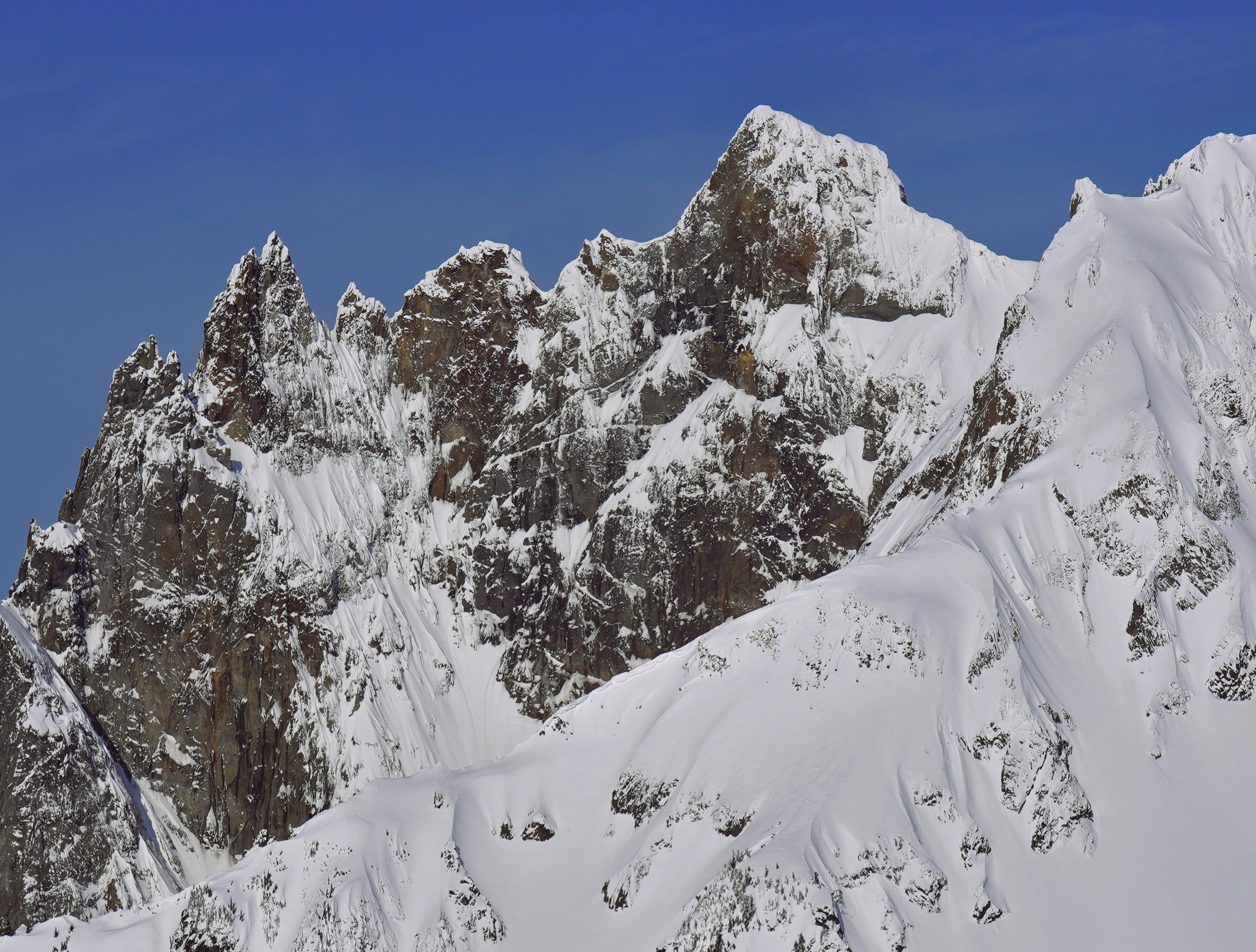
- East face of Pyroclastic Peak

Highest point
- Elevation: 2,349 m (7,707 ft)
- Prominence: 145 m (476 ft)
- Coordinates: 50°06′51.8″N 123°17′34.1″W

Geography
- Location within British Columbia
- Location: British Columbia, Canada
- District: New Westminster Land District
- Parent range: Pacific Ranges
- Topo map: NTS 92J3 Brandywine Falls

Geology
- Rock age: Pleistocene
- Mountain type: Stratovolcano
- Volcanic arc: Canadian Cascade Arc
- Volcanic belt: Garibaldi Volcanic Belt
- Last eruption: Pleistocene

Climbing
- First ascent: 1971 R. Chicoine; F. Douglas; R. Wyborn

Pyroclastic Peak is the second highest of the five named volcanic peaks immediately south of Mount Cayley in British Columbia, Canada. It is steep and rotten and is located 12 km (7 mi) southwest of Callaghan Lake and 24 km (15 mi) west of Whistler. It is part of the Pacific Ring of Fire that includes over 160 active volcanoes.

On the south ridge of Pyroclastic Peak is a feature known as The Vulcan's Thumb which remains unclimbed because of the looseness of the rock.

== See also ==
- Cascade Volcanoes
- Mount Cayley
- Garibaldi Volcanic Belt
- Volcanism of Canada
- Volcanism of Western Canada
- List of volcanoes in Canada
