= Subaerial =

Term in geology and botany

In natural science, subaerial (literally "under the air") has been used since 1833, notably in geology and botany, to describe features and events occurring or formed on or near the Earth's land surface. They are thus exposed to Earth's atmosphere. This may be contrasted with subaqueous events or features located below a water surface, submarine events or features located below a sea surface, subterranean events or features located below ground, or subglacial events or features located below glacial ice such as ice sheets.

== Geology ==
For example, a subaerial eruption of a volcano is one that ejects material in the open but "under the air" (under the atmosphere). Subaerial weathering is weathering by rain, frost, rivers etc.

The term "subaerial" may exclude processes occurring in caves.

The term is often used in sedimentology.

== Botany ==
Leaves are subaerial organs of plants.

Some plants may have subaerial roots, either totally (epiphytic plants such as some orchids) or more commonly only partly so. The oil palm tree can grow roots into accumulations of decaying leaves on the soil surface; these roots are said to be subaerial. Epiphyte plants growing above ground that do not feed from their tree support (for example through their haustorium or feeding part having dug into the tree, such as Mistletoe) have subaerial roots (for example some Ficus species).

Subaerial stems are the stems that do not rise up but grow just above the ground. As a type of asexual propagation, these subaerial stolons, also called runners, often develop roots and leaves from their nodes.

Some pond plants have subaerial leaves as well as submerged leaves (water plantain, flowering rush).

Subaerial algae are those that live on surfaces above the soil. The surfaces are diverse, and can either be natural (e.g. rocks, bark and leaves of trees, and hair of animals) or artificial (concrete, woodwork, and metal). When on artificial substrates, subaerial algae can be economically significant because they often lead to biodeterioration of the substrates.

== See also ==
- Specialized root types
- Velamen – epidermis of subaerial roots in some orchids and other epiphytic plants
