= Tricouni Southwest =

Tricouni Southwest is a basaltic andesite lava flow in the Mount Cayley volcanic field of the Garibaldi Volcanic Belt in southwestern British Columbia, Canada, located south of Tricouni Peak.

== See also ==
- Volcanism of Canada
- Volcanism of Western Canada
