= Mount Brew (Cheakamus River) =

Mountain in British Columbia, Canada

- Location within British Columbia
- Interactive map of Mount Brew

Highest point
- Elevation: 1,757 m (5,764 ft)
- Prominence: 127 m (417 ft)
- Coordinates: 50°02′37″N 123°11′19″W

Geography
- Location: British Columbia, Canada
- District: New Westminster Land District
- Parent range: Pacific Ranges, Coast Mountains
- Topo map: NTS 92J3 Brandywine Falls

Geology
- Rock age: Pleistocene
- Mountain type: Subglacial mound
- Volcanic arc: Canadian Cascade Arc
- Volcanic belt: Garibaldi Volcanic Belt
- Volcanic field: Mount Cayley volcanic field
- Last eruption: Pleistocene

Climbing
- Easiest route: off trail hike

Mount Brew is a rounded mountain in southwestern British Columbia, Canada, located 18 km (11 mi) southwest of Whistler in the Pacific Ranges of the Coast Mountains. A public cabin run by the Varsity Outdoor Club, Brew Hut, is located near the summit. The alpine area is a popular destination for hiking in the summer and backcountry ski touring in the winter and spring.

Mount Brew is a volcanic feature in the Mount Cayley volcanic field of the central Garibaldi Volcanic Belt of the Canadian Cascade Arc. It formed during the Pleistocene period when volcanic activity in this area occurred under glacial ice during the last glacial period. Although it had a vigorous start, the eruption that formed Mount Brew was not sufficiently sustained to form a larger edifice that could break through the surrounding ice and water to form a tuya. Instead, the eruption produced a subglacial mound.

== See also ==
- List of volcanoes in Canada
- Volcanism of Canada
- Volcanism of Western Canada
