= Career Achievement Award =

The Career Achievement Award, also referred to as the Career Achievement Medal, is an award of the Volcanology and Igneous Petrology Division of the Geological Association of Canada. First awarded in 1993, it is given to scientists "in recognition of career achievements in the field of volcanology and/or igneous petrology".

== Recipients ==
- 1993 – W. Robert A. Baragar
- 1994 – William H. Mathews
- 1995 – Jack G. Souther
- 1996 – T. H. Pearce
- 1998 – J. Nicholls
- 1999 – P. Roeder
- 2000 – K. L. Currie
- 2001 – Ron Emslie
- 2003 – Don Francis
- 2005 – Jaroslav Dostal
- 2006 – Robert Kerrich
- 2008 – Sandra M. Barr
- 2009 – Don Baker
- 2010 – Kelly Russell
- 2011 – Georgia Pe–Piper
- 2012 – John Stix
- 2013 – Réjean Hébert
- 2014 – not awarded
- 2015 – not awarded
- 2016 – Joseph Whalen
- 2017 – Barrie Clarke
- 2018 – Roger Mitchell
- 2019 – Donald B. Dingwell
- 2020 – John Greenough

== See also ==
- List of geology awards
- List of geologists
- List of awards named after people
