= Vulcan's Thumb =

Mountain in British Columbia, Canada

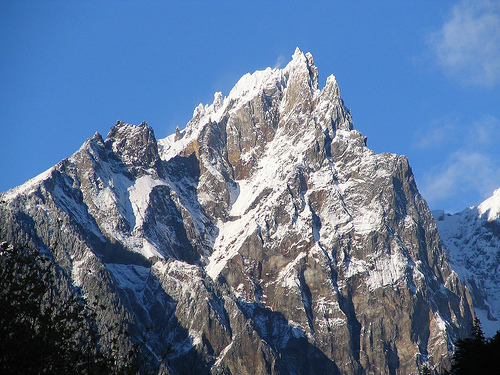

Highest point
- Elevation: 2,290 m (7,510 ft)
- Coordinates: 50°06′41.06″N 123°17′40.22″W

Geography
- Location within British Columbia
- Location: British Columbia, Canada
- District: New Westminster Land District
- Parent range: Pacific Ranges
- Topo map: NTS 92J3 Brandywine Falls

Geology
- Rock age: Pleistocene
- Mountain type: Pinnacle
- Volcanic arc: Canadian Cascade Arc
- Volcanic belt: Garibaldi Volcanic Belt

Climbing
- First ascent: None

The Vulcan's Thumb is a rock pinnacle in the Pacific Ranges of southwestern British Columbia, Canada. It is the largest of a number of slender pinnacles protruding from the sharp summit ridge of Pyroclastic Peak, which forms part of the Mount Cayley massif.

Three eruptive stages built the Mount Cayley massif, the second of which is named after the Vulcan's Thumb.

== See also ==
- Cascade Volcanoes
- Garibaldi Volcanic Belt
- List of volcanoes in Canada
- Volcanism of Canada
- Volcanism of Western Canada
