= Slag Hill =

Subglacial volcano in British Columbia, Canada

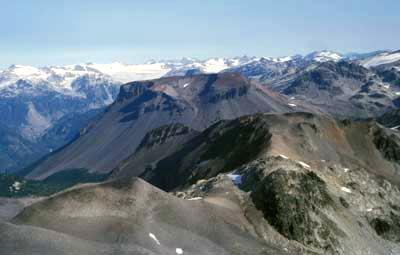
- An image of Ring Mountain (background) and Slag Hill (foreground)

Highest point
- Coordinates: 50°11′00.23″N 123°18′00.25″W

Geography
- Location within British Columbia
- Location: British Columbia, Canada
- Parent range: Pacific Ranges

Geology
- Mountain type: Subglacial volcano
- Volcanic arc: Canadian Cascade Arc
- Volcanic belt: Garibaldi Volcanic Belt
- Volcanic field: Mount Cayley volcanic field
- Last eruption: Holocene age

Slag Hill is a subglacial volcano associated with the Mount Cayley volcanic field in British Columbia, Canada. It consists of glassy, augite-phyric basaltic andesite in steep-sided, glassy, finely jointed domes and one small, flat-topped bluff. The finely jointed domes are similar to those of Ember Ridge. There are quench features at Slag Hill, which is suggesting that the volcanic activity was subglacial. Slag Hill was formed throughout the Pleistocene period, but its most recent volcanic activity produced a lava flow on its western lobe that shows no evidence of ice-contact volcanism. This indicates the lava flow was erupted less than 10,000 years ago after the last glacial period.

== See also ==
- Mount Cayley
- Cascade Volcanoes
- Garibaldi Volcanic Belt
- List of volcanoes in Canada
- Volcanism of Canada
- Volcanism of Western Canada
