= Cheakamus River =

River in British Columbia, Canada

Cheakamus River Rivière Cheakamus
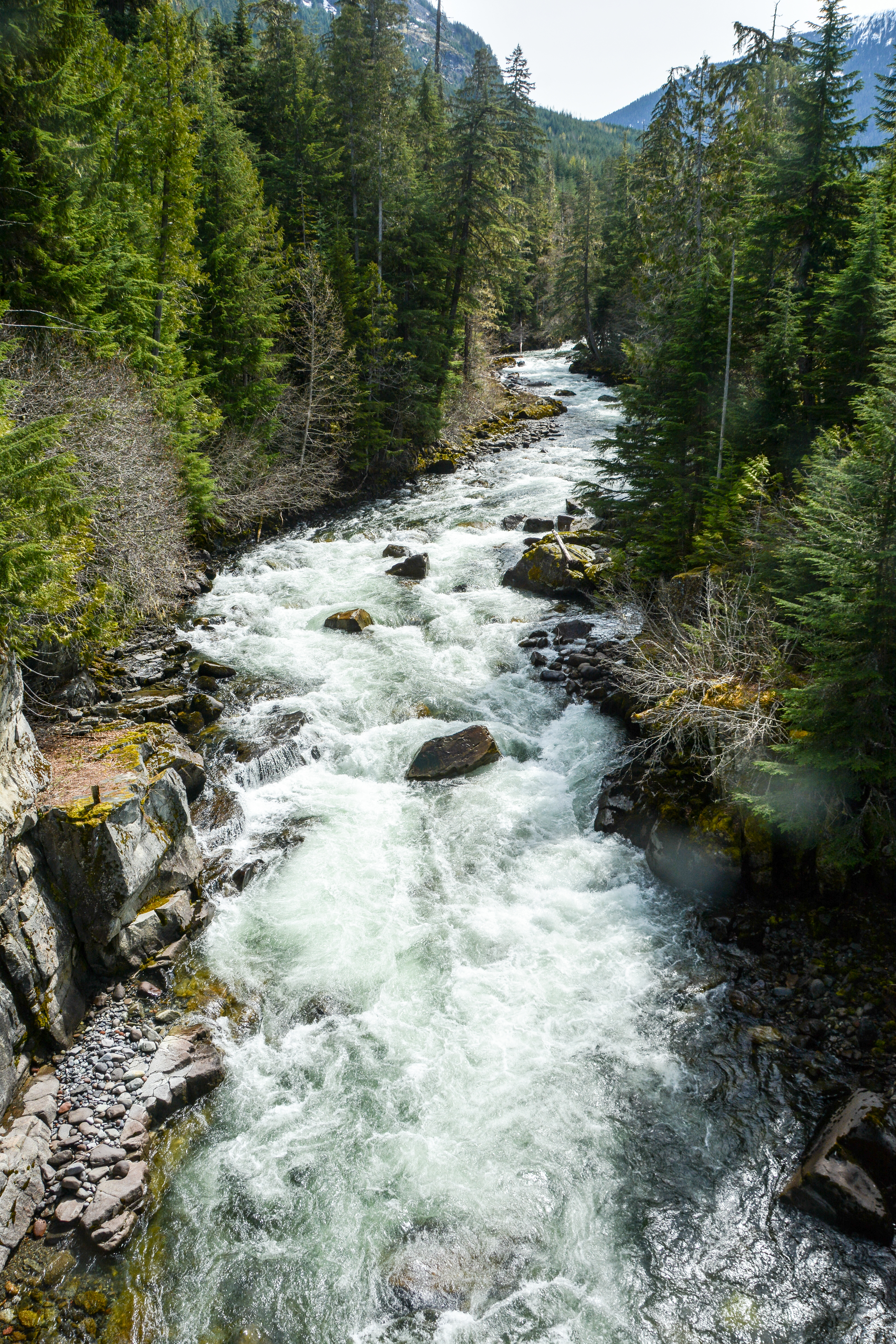

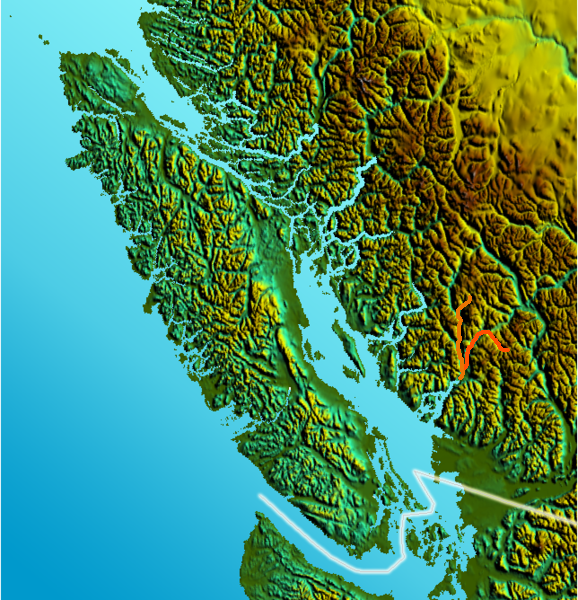
- Location map of Cheakamus River; Squamish River shown in orange.

Location
- Country: Canada
- Province: British Columbia
- Land District: New Westminster

Physical characteristics
- Source: McBride Glacier
  - location: Garibaldi Provincial Park, Coast Mountains
  - coordinates: 49°57′N 122°45′W
  - elevation: 1,880 m (6,170 ft)
- Mouth: Squamish River
  - coordinates: 49°47′N 123°10′W
  - elevation: 18 m (59 ft)
- Length: 70 km (43 mi)
- Basin size: 1,070 km^{2} (410 sq mi)

The Cheakamus River (pron. CHEEK-a-mus) is a tributary of the Squamish River, beginning at the terminus of McBride Glacier on Mount Sir Richard in Garibaldi Provincial Park upstream from Cheakamus Lake on the southeastern outskirts of the resort area of Whistler. The river flows into Cheakamus Lake before exiting it and flowing northwest until it turns south and enters Daisy Lake. Between the outlet of Daisy Lake and its mouth, much of its length is spent going through Cheakamus Canyon, where the river flows through swift rapids and even one good sized waterfall. The river flows south from the lake and through the canyon before joining the Squamish River at Cheekye, a few miles north of the town of Squamish. The river's name is an anglicization of the name of Chiyakmesh ("people of the fish weir"), a village of the Squamish people and a reserve of the Squamish Nation.

The c. 70 km (c.44 mi) length of the Cheakamus is followed by British Columbia Highway 99 (the Sea-to-Sky Highway) and the British Columbia Railway. The Cheakamus is a whitewater rafting and kayaking route, and is known for its steelhead and salmon fishing. Much of the flow of the upper Cheakamus is diverted from Daisy Lake beneath the mountains to the west to the Cheakamus Powerhouse on the Squamish River. Notable just north of Daisy Lake is Brandywine Falls. The Nordic events complex of the 2010 Winter Olympics was located on Callaghan Creek, a tributary of the Cheakamus just upstream from Brandywine Creek.

== Largest tributaries ==
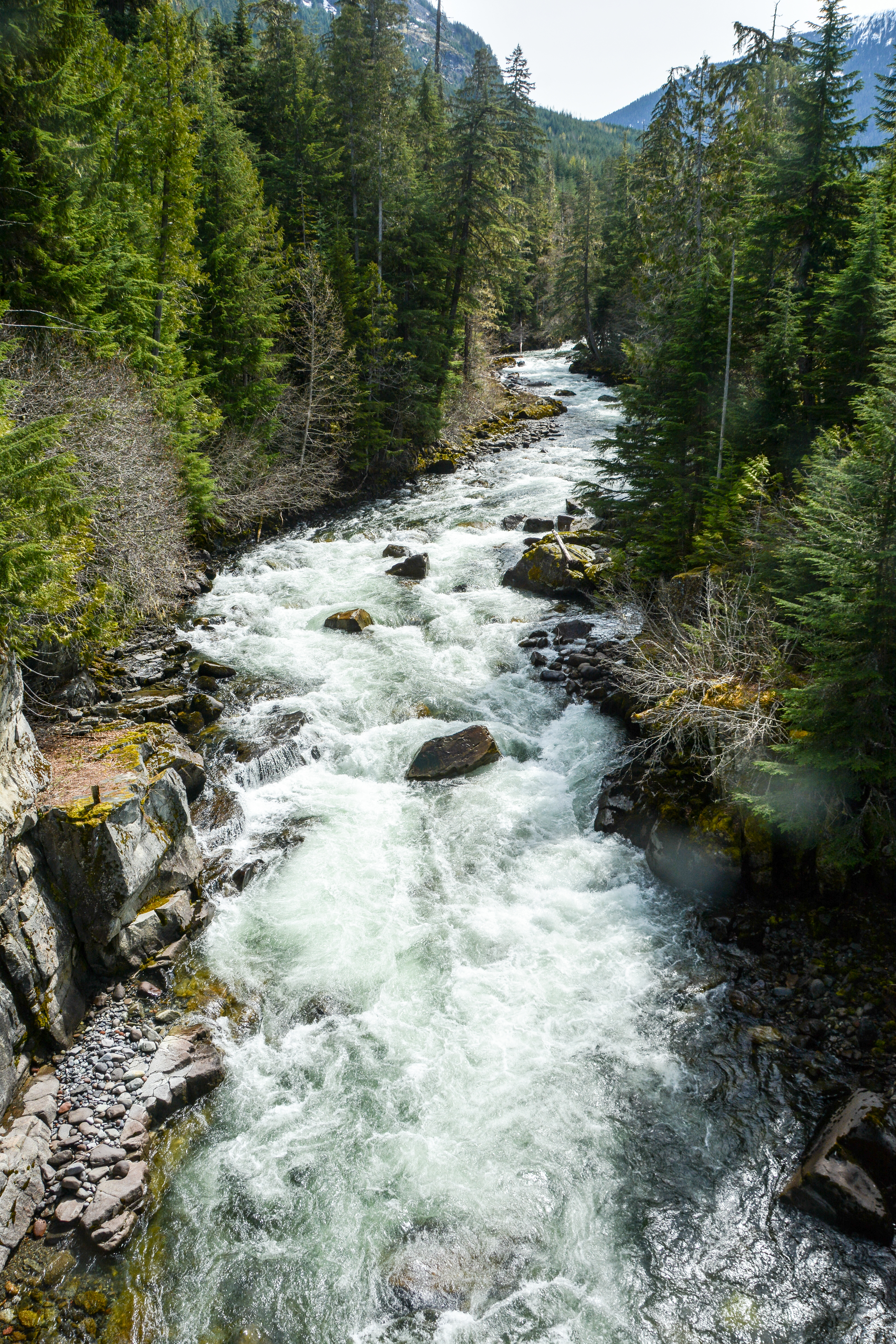
Cheakamus River in Whistler Interpretive Forest

- Callaghan Creek and Callaghan Valley
- Brandywine Creek
- Cheekye River

== Cheakamus River derailment ==
On August 5, 2005, a long Canadian National train, heading inland from Brackendale, derailed and nine empty lumber flat cars along with one tank car of sodium hydroxide crashed off the main bridge, falling into the river. The tank car spilled its contents into the river, killing an estimated 500,000+ fish. Six years later, a local Vancouver News channel reported on the return of the fish to the river.

== See also ==
- The Barrier
- Cheakamus Valley basalts
- List of rivers of British Columbia
- Mount Cayley volcanic field
