= Subaerial eruption =

Volcanic eruption which Is not underwater or underground

In volcanology, a subaerial eruption is any sort of volcanic eruption that occurs on the land surface, or in the open air "under the air". They generally produce pyroclastic flows, lava fountains and lava flows, which are commonly classified in different subaerial eruption types, including Plinian, Peléan and Hawaiian eruptions. Subaerial eruptions contrast with subaqueous, submarine and subglacial eruptions which all originate below forms of a water surface.
