= Canadian Journal of Earth Sciences =

- Discipline: Earth sciences, geochemistry, geology, mineralogy, petrology
- Language: English, French
- Edited by: Brendan Murphy and Sally Pehrsson

Publication details
- History: 1963–present
- Publisher: Canadian Science Publishing
- Frequency: Monthly
- Impact factor: 1.369 (2020)

Standard abbreviations
- ISO 4: Can. J. Earth Sci.

Indexing
- CODEN: CJESAP
- ISSN: 0008-4077 (print); 1480-3313 (web)
- LCCN: 65009875
- OCLC no.: 818994372

Links
- Journal homepage; Online access; Online archive

The Canadian Journal of Earth Sciences is a monthly peer-reviewed scientific journal established in 1963, which reports current research on all aspects of the Earth sciences. It is published by Canadian Science Publishing. The journal also publishes special issues that focus on information and studies limited in scope to a specific segment of the Earth sciences. The editors-in-chief are Dr. Brendan Murphy (St. Francis Xavier University) and Sally Pehrsson (University of Saskatchewan). According to the Journal Citation Reports, the journal has a 2020 impact factor of 1.369.
