= Mount Cayley =

Mountains in British Columbia

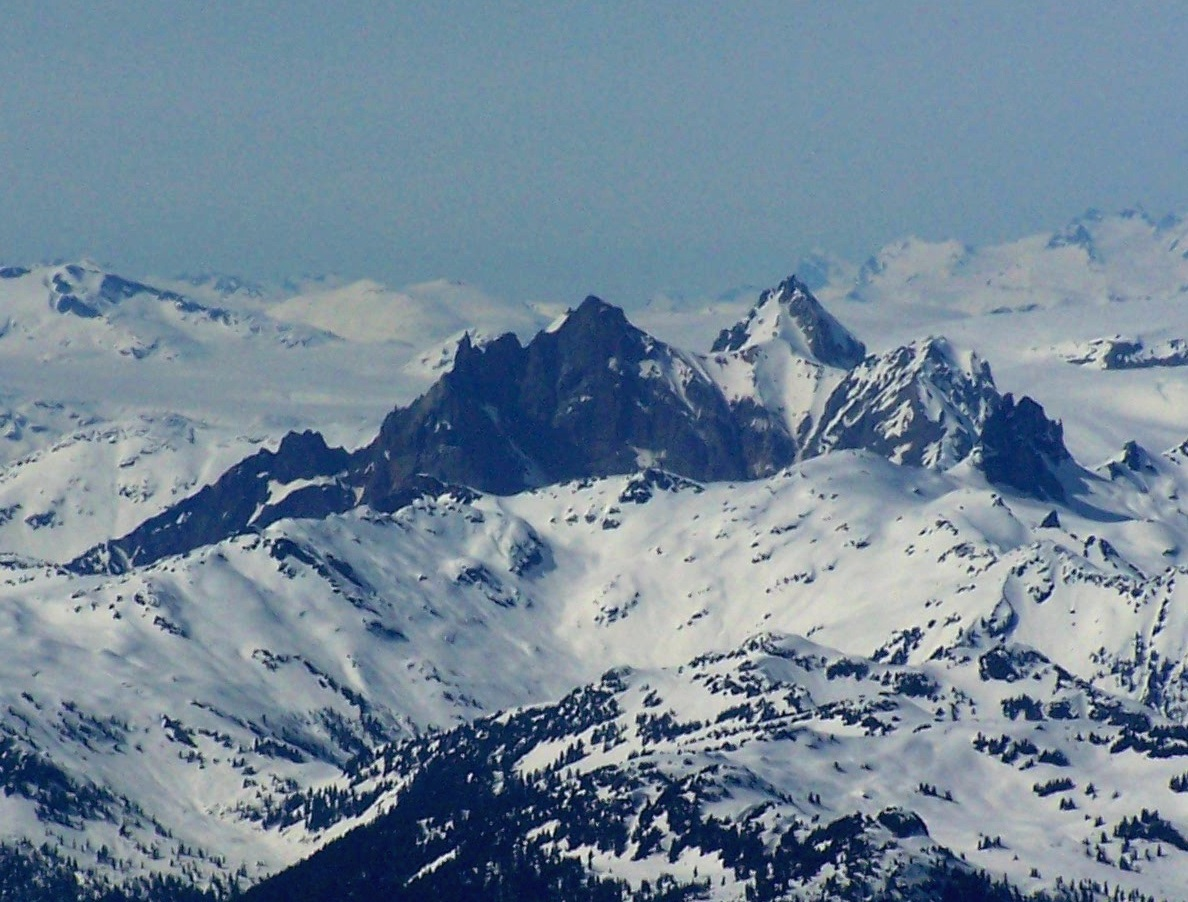
- Mount Cayley as seen from the southeast. Summits left to right are Pyroclastic Peak, Mount Cayley and Wizard Peak.

Highest point
- Elevation: 2,385 m (7,825 ft)
- Listing: Mountains of British Columbia
- Coordinates: 50°07′13″N 123°17′27″W

Geography
- Location in British Columbia
- Country: Canada
- Province: British Columbia
- District: New Westminster Land District
- Range coordinates: 50°06′58″N 123°17′15″W
- Parent range: Pacific Ranges
- Topo map: NTS 92J3 Brandywine Falls

Geology
- Rock age: Neogene-to-Quaternary
- Mountain type: Stratovolcano
- Volcanic arc: Canadian Cascade Arc
- Volcanic belt: Garibaldi Volcanic Belt
- Volcanic field: Mount Cayley volcanic field

Climbing
- First ascent: 1928 by E. C. Brooks, W. G. Wheatley, B. Clegg, R. E. Knight and T. Fyles

Mount Cayley is an eroded but potentially active stratovolcano in the Pacific Ranges of southwestern British Columbia, Canada. Located 45 km (28 mi) north of Squamish and 24 km (15 mi) west of Whistler, the volcano resides on the edge of the Powder Mountain Icefield. It consists of massif that towers over the Cheakamus and Squamish river valleys. All major summits have elevations greater than 2,000 m (6,600 ft), Mount Cayley being the highest at 2,385 m (7,825 ft). The surrounding area has been inhabited by indigenous peoples for more than 7,000 years while geothermal exploration has taken place there for the last four decades.

Part of the Garibaldi Volcanic Belt, Mount Cayley was formed by subduction zone volcanism along the western margin of North America. Eruptive activity began about 4,000,000 years ago and has since undergone three stages of growth, the first two of which built most of the volcano. The latest eruptive period occurred sometime in the last 400,000 years with lesser activity continuing into the present day.

Future eruptions are likely to threaten neighbouring communities with pyroclastic flows, lahars (volcanically induced mudslides, landslides and debris flows) and floods. To monitor this threat, the volcano and its surroundings are monitored by the Geological Survey of Canada (GSC). Eruption impact would be largely a result of the concentration of vulnerable infrastructure in nearby valleys.

== Geography and geology ==
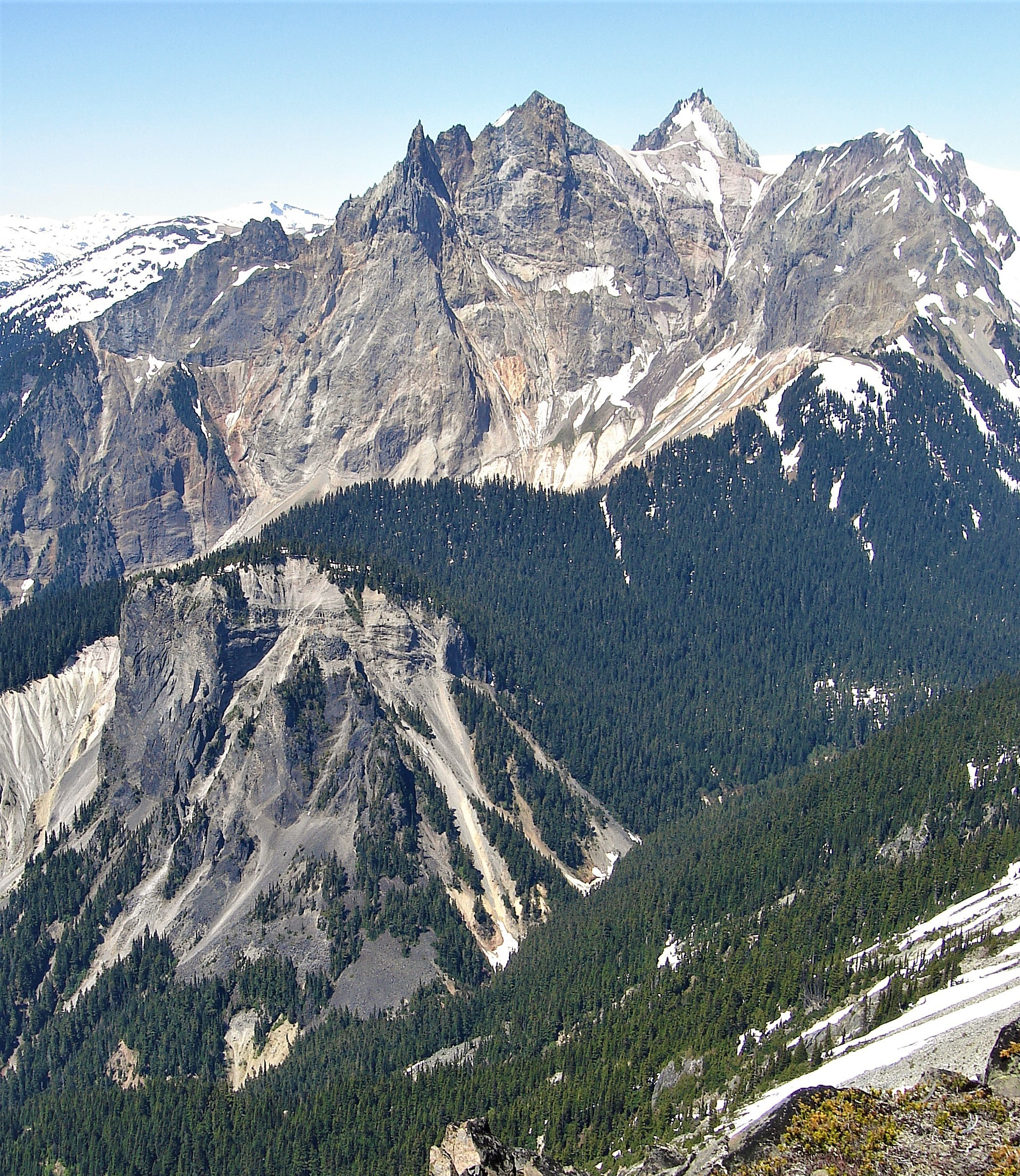
Mt. Cayley massif, south aspect

The volcano resides in the middle of a north–south trending zone of volcanism called the Mount Cayley volcanic field. It consists predominantly of volcanoes that formed subglacially during the Late Pleistocene age, such as Pali Dome, Slag Hill, Ring Mountain and Ember Ridge, but activity continued at Pali Dome and Slag Hill into the Holocene epoch. The Mount Cayley volcanic field is part of the Garibaldi Volcanic Belt, which in turn represents a northern extension of the Cascade Volcanic Arc. Volcanism of the Cascade Arc is largely a result of the Juan de Fuca Plate sliding under the North American Plate at the Cascadia subduction zone.

Three main summits comprise the Mount Cayley massif. The highest and northernmost is Mount Cayley with an elevation of 2,385 m (7,825 ft). Its northeastern flank abuts the southern end of the Powder Mountain Icefield. This is a 9 km (5.6 mi) long and 5 km (3.1 mi) wide irregularly-shaped glacier that trends slightly to the northwest. Just southwest of Mount Cayley lies Pyroclastic Peak, 2,341 m (7,680 ft) in elevation. It contains a jagged summit ridge of many slender rock pinnacles, the largest of which is known as the Vulcan's Thumb. Wizard Peak with an elevation of 2,240 m (7,350 ft) is east of Pyroclastic Peak and is the lowest of the three main summits.

As a stratovolcano, Mount Cayley is built up of solidified lava and ash from successive volcanic eruptions. It is predominantly dacitic in composition, although rhyodacite is also common. Its original and current volumes remain uncertain. It may have had a volume as large as 13 km^{3} (3.1 mi^{3}), but erosion has since reduced it to glacially eroded crags. The modern volcano has an estimated volume of 8 km^{3} (1.9 mi^{3}) and is only a modest fraction of its total output of silicic eruptive products. It has a proximal relief of 550 m (1,800 ft) and a draping relief of 2,070 m (6,790 ft), with a nearly vertical cliff more than 500 m (1,600 ft) high immediately above the Turbid Creek valley.^{[a]} Turbid Creek, Dusty Creek, Avalanche Creek and Shovelnose Creek flow from the slopes of Mount Cayley.

Deep seismic profiling 12.5 to 13 km (7.8 to 8.1 mi) below the volcano has identified a large bright spot, a reflector interpreted to be a mid-crustal magma chamber or body of very hot rock. Similar mid-crustal reflectors have been identified under subduction zone volcanoes in Japan.

== Volcanic history ==
Mount Cayley has experienced volcanic eruptions sporadically for the last 4,000,000 years, making it one of the most persistent eruptive centres in the Garibaldi Volcanic Belt. Three primary eruptive stages in the history of the volcano have been identified. The Mount Cayley and Vulcan's Thumb stages occurred between 4,000,000 and 600,000 years ago with the construction of the stratovolcano and plug domes. A 300,000-year-long period of quiescence followed, during which prolonged erosion destroyed much of the original volcanic structure. This was followed by the third and final Shovelnose stage about 300,000 to 200,000 years ago with the emplacement of parasitic lava domes and flows. Although one of the Shovelnose domes has been potassium-argon dated at 310,000 years old, this date may be in error from excess argon. The Shovelnose stage rocks could be much younger, perhaps less than 15,000 years old.

Eruptions during the three stages produced volcanic rocks of felsic and intermediate compositions, including andesite, dacite and rhyodacite. The lack of evidence for volcano-ice interactions at Mount Cayley implies that all eruptive stages most likely took place prior to glacial periods. This contrasts with many neighbouring volcanoes, which contain abundant volcanic glass and fine-scale columnar jointing from contact with ice during eruptions.

Initial volcanic activity of Mount Cayley 4,000,000 years ago corresponded with changes to the regional plate tectonics. This involved the separation of the Explorer and Juan de Fuca plates off the British Columbia Coast, which had some significant ramifications for regional geologic evolution. After this reorganization ceased, volcanism shifted westward from the Pemberton Volcanic Belt to establish the younger and currently active Garibaldi Volcanic Belt. The westward shift in volcanism may have been related to steepening of the Juan de Fuca slab after the formation of the Explorer Plate.

=== Mount Cayley stage ===
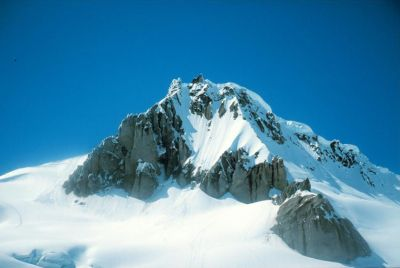
Mount Cayley viewed from southeast showing light coloured breccia cut by a central spine of dacite which forms the summit ridge.

The early Mount Cayley stage was characterized by the eruption of felsic lava flows and pyroclastic rocks onto a crystalline basement. Initial volcanism formed a southwesterly-dipping prism of dacite flows and tephra cut by several dikes and sills. These rocks have been hydrothermally altered to varying degrees and are light yellow or red in colour. They are well exposed in the prominent southwestern cliffs of the volcano.

Subsequent activity deposited a series of massive dacite flows up to 150 m (490 ft) thick, which form the summit and northern slope of Wizard Peak. The Mount Cayley stage culminated with the emplacement of a central plug dome that forms the narrow jagged summit ridge of Mount Cayley. This edifice consists of similar intrusive dacite.

=== Vulcan's Thumb stage ===
The next eruptive period, the Vulcan's Thumb stage, built an edifice that grew upon the southwestern slope of the ancestral Mount Cayley stratovolcano. This began with the eruption of massive dacite flows and blocky agglutinated breccias onto basement and older volcanic rocks of the Mount Cayley stage. These rocks partially form a ridge south of Wizard Peak and comprise the prominent summit ridge pinnacles of Pyroclastic Peak, including the Vulcan's Thumb.

Later activity produced an overlying 1 km (0.62 mi) wide and 4 km (2.5 mi) long southwest-trending lobe of unconsolidated or poorly consolidated tephra. The tephra consists of ash and lapilli-sized fragments that have been heavily eroded to form vertical cliffs and ridges. Volcanism also deposited a 130 m (430 ft) thick sequence of blocky dacitic tuff breccia between Wizard Peak and Mount Cayley.

=== Shovelnose stage ===
Volcanic activity of the final Shovelnose stage involved the eruption of two lava domes at the east and southeast margins of Mount Cayley in the upper Shovelnose Creek valley. The southeast dacite dome forms 400 m (1,300 ft) high cliffs of small diameter columnar joints. It was the source of a 5 km (3.1 mi) long dacite flow that extends down the Shovelnose and Turbid creek valleys to near the Squamish River. The east lava dome was built upon blocky bedded tephra overlying basement rocks and consists of a steep-sided columnar jointed mass of dacite.

=== Recent activity ===
Although Mount Cayley is not known to have had historical volcanic eruptions, low-level activity has continued into recorded history. Shallow earthquakes have occurred in the vicinity since 1985 and the Shovelnose and Turbid creek valleys contain two and three hot springs, respectively. The GSC therefore considers the volcano to be potentially active. Temperatures ranging from 18 to 40 °C (64 to 104 °F) have been measured from the hot springs.

The existence of hot springs indicate that magmatic heat is still present. Extensive tufa and sinter deposits inhabit the main hot springs while bright red ferruginous ochre precipitates from several cold seeps in the vicinity. The springs are confined around dacite cupolas and dikes that were emplaced during the Vulcan's Thumb stage.

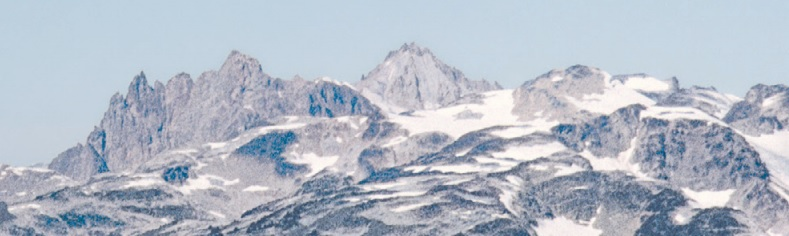
Panoramic view of the Mount Cayley volcano with Pyroclastic Peak on the left and Mount Cayley in the middle. View is westward 25 km (16 mi) from Whistler Mountain.

== Landslide history ==
Because Mount Cayley is rich in coarse proximal pyroclastic deposits, some of them hydrothermally altered, it is especially prone to slope failure and debris avalanches. At least three major debris avalanches have occurred from the western slope in the last 10,000 years, all of which blocked the Squamish River and formed temporary lakes upstream. The first and largest event about 4,800 years ago produced a 200,000,000 to 300,000,000 m^{3} (7.1×10^{9} to 1.06×10^{10} ft^{3}) debris fan exposed along the Squamish River. A 0.5 to 40 cm (0.20 to 15.75 in) thick sequence of silts, sands and pebbles interbedded in the debris fan suggests that it may be the product of two major, closely spaced, debris avalanches rather than a single event. Another large debris avalanche about 1,100 years ago deposited material immediately upstream of the mouth of Turbid Creek. The third event followed about 500 years ago with the deposition of two diamicton units along Turbid Creek and was the smallest of the three major prehistoric debris avalanches. A lack of organic and paleosol horizons between the two units implies that they most likely represent separate surges within the same debris avalanche event.

At least three smaller scale debris avalanches have occurred in historic time. A 5,000,000 m^{3} (180,000,000 ft^{3}) landslide occurred in 1963 with the failure of a large volcanic block consisting of poorly consolidated tuff breccia and columnar-jointed dacite. The mass slid into Dusty Creek where it quickly fragmented into an aggregate then travelled roughly 1 km (0.62 mi) downstream where it entered the broader flatter valley of Turbid Creek for an additional 1 km (0.62 mi). Both creeks were blocked by the event, resulting in the creation of lakes that eventually overtopped and breached the landslide dam to produce floods and possibly debris flows which in turn swept down Turbid Creek far beyond the landslide terminus. In June 1984, a major rockslide and debris flow resulted from a 3,200,000 m^{3} (110,000,000 ft^{3}) collapse at the head of Avalanche Creek. The debris flow reached the mouth of Turbid Creek where it destroyed a logging road bridge and blocked the Squamish River, introducing massive quantities of sediment. The third event took place along Turbid Creek in June 2014 and involved a debris flow that removed part of the Squamish River Forest Service Road.

== Human history ==
The area has been inhabited by First Nations for thousands of years. Both the Mount Cayley volcano and The Black Tusk on the opposite side of the Cheakamus River valley are called taḵ'taḵmu'yin tl'a in7in'axa7en by the Squamish people. In their language it means "Landing Place of the Thunderbird". The Thunderbird is a legendary creature in North American indigenous peoples' history and culture. When the bird flaps its wings, thunder is created, and lightning originates from its eyes. Mount Cayley and The Black Tusk are considered sacred to the Squamish people as they have played an important part of their history. Mountain bilberries, Canadian blueberries and oval-leaved blueberries, being a favored food of the Squamish people, were gathered in large berry fields on and near the massif. Glassy rhyodacite collected from small outcrops on the slopes have been found in goat hunting sites and the Elaho rockshelter which have been collectively dated around 8,000 to 100 years old. Cayley rhyodacite has only been found in the northern parts of the Squamish Nation territory.

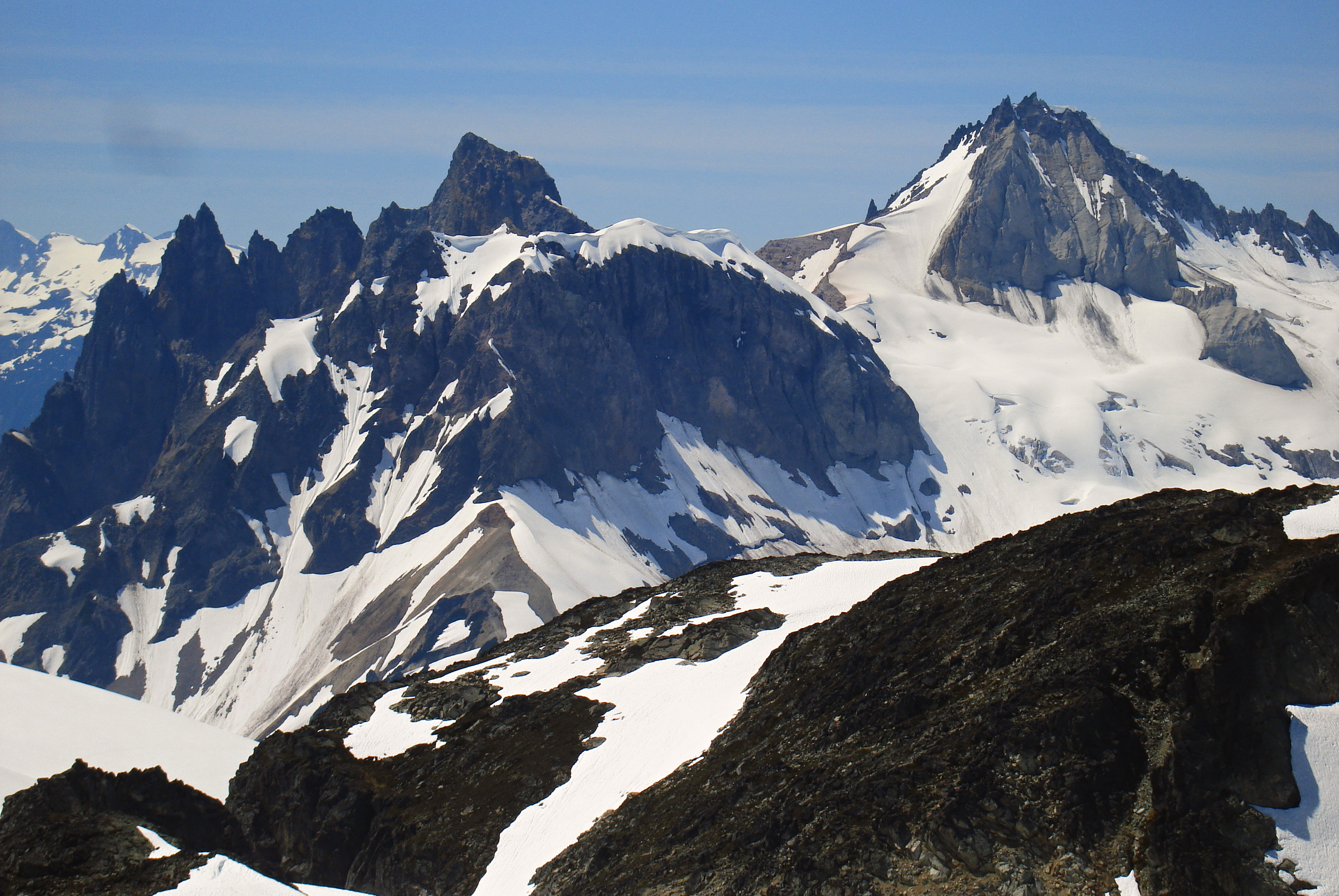
Mount Cayley as seen from the east

There had been no first ascent of the massif until July 1928 when an Alpine Club of Canada party, consisting of mountaineers R. E. Knight, W. G. Wheatley, E. C. Brooks, T. Fyles and B. Clegg, climbed Mount Cayley. Fyles submitted the mountain name to the Government of British Columbia in September 1928 for Beverley Cochrane Cayley, a mountaineer and friend of those in the climbing expedition who had died in June that year. The name became official on April 2, 1929, and photographs of the peak were published with Fyles' description of first ascent in the 1931 Canadian Alpine Journal Vol XX.

Mount Cayley has been investigated as a potential geothermal energy resource since at least the late 1970s. Geothermal exploration by Energy, Mines and Resources Canada commenced in 1977 with the drilling of two shallow boreholes on the west side of the volcano for temperature observation. High geothermal gradients of 51 and 65 millikelvin per metre were obtained from this work. Further drilling on the east and west sides of the volcano in 1980–1982 by Nevin Sadlier-Brown Goodbrand Limited on behalf of the GSC showed geothermal gradients ranging from 45 to 95 millikelvin per metre. In 2002, BC Hydro published a report identifying 16 prospective geothermal sites throughout British Columbia. They named Mount Cayley as one of the six sites with the highest potential for commercial development. There is "promising" potential for a 100 megawatt geothermal power station at the volcano but the severe terrain makes development difficult and expensive. The heat source has also yet to be confirmed through deep drilling.

== Volcanic hazards ==
Though Mount Cayley is currently quiet, it still poses potential hazards to nearby towns as well as logging and recreational areas. GSC seismic data suggest that the volcano still contains magma, indicating possible future eruptive activity and associated volcanic hazards such as landslides. An eruption scenario for the volcano was organized by GSC scientists in 2000 to show how Western Canada is vulnerable to such an event. They based the scenario on past activity in the Garibaldi Volcanic Belt and involved both explosive and effusive activity. The scenario was published in 2003 as an article for Natural Hazards, a Springer journal devoting on all aspects of natural hazards including risk management and the forecasting of catastrophic events.

If eruptive activity were to resume, scientists would likely be able to detect increased seismicity as magma makes its way through the crust. The abundance of seismic activity and the sensitivity of the existing Canadian National Seismograph Network in this area would alert the GSC and possibly trigger an expanded monitoring effort. As the magma nears the surface, the volcano would likely swell and the surface fracture, causing greatly increased vigour in the hot springs and the creation of new springs or fumaroles. Minor and possibly large landslides could occur and might temporarily block the Squamish River, as has happened in the past without earthquake shaking and intrusion-related deformation. Eventually the near-surface magma may cause phreatic explosions and debris flows. By this time Highway 99 would be closed, Squamish would be evacuated and Whistler would be at least considered for evacuation.

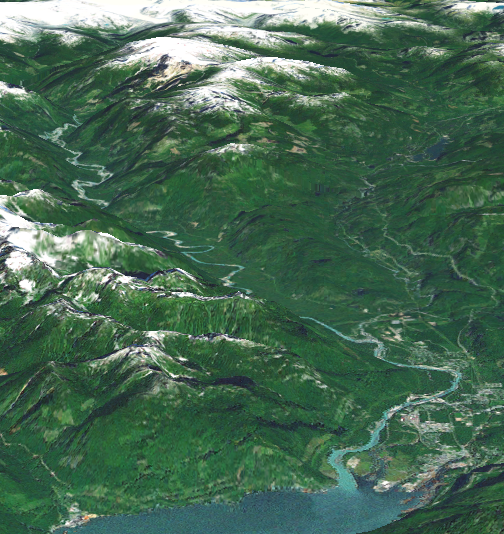
NASA World Wind imagery showing the Cheakamus valley on the right and the Squamish valley on the left upstream. The Mount Cayley is on the upper left slope of the mountain ridge between the two valleys. Squamish is in the bottom right corner of image.

In the event of an explosive eruption, an ash plume could reach 20 km (12 mi) in height and may be maintained for 12 hours. Air traffic would be diverted from the area and all airports covered by the plume would be closed, notably those in Vancouver, Victoria, Kamloops, Prince George and Seattle. Above the vent area, material from the eruption plume would collapse to form pyroclastic flows and would flow east and west into the Squamish and Cheakamus valleys. These would rapidly melt snow and ice in the summit area, generating debris flows that could reach Squamish and Daisy Lake, damaging much infrastructure. Heavy ash falls would occur in the Vancouver area, the Fraser Valley, Bellingham, Kamloops, Whistler and Pemberton. The ash would damage power and communication lines and satellite dishes, as well as computer and other electrical equipment. Telephone, radio, cell phone and satellite communications would be cut off. Weak structures could collapse under the weight of the ash. The eruption plume would then spread to envelop most of the west coast from Seattle to Anchorage, causing all enclosed airports to be closed and all relevant flights to be diverted or cancelled. Eastward migration of the plume would disrupt air traffic across Canada from Alberta to Newfoundland and Labrador. Ash from further, minor explosive activity could continue to fall lightly but persistently in the Whistler–Pemberton area, followed by weeks of viscous lava dome growth punctuated by small explosions. The explosions would generate short-lived 10 to 15 km (6.2 to 9.3 mi) high plumes, small pyroclastic flows to the Squamish and Cheakamus valleys and ash plumes to the north and east.

Explosions might cease and be replaced by slow, continuous growth of a lava dome in the new crater. Rain and seasonal snow melt would regularly remobilize the tephra into lahars and these would continue to threaten the Squamish and Cheakamus valleys. The solidifying, spreading lava could then generate rockfalls and form a voluminous talus apron into the Squamish valley. As the lava dome spreads, it would periodically undergo gravitational collapse to generate dense pyroclastic flows into the Squamish and Cheakamus valleys. Ash elutriated from the pyroclastic flows would form plumes up to 10 km (6.2 mi) high, again dropping ash onto Pemberton and Whistler and causing disruptions to local air traffic. Infrequently, the lava dome might produce small explosions, ash plumes and pyroclastic flows. Squamish would remain evacuated, Highway 99 would remain closed and unrepairable and travel between Whistler/Pemberton and Vancouver would be forced to go via a much longer route to the east.

Eruptive activity itself could go on for years, followed by years of declining secondary activity. The cooling lava would intermittently spall sections to produce pyroclastic flows. The fragmental material on the slopes and in valleys would be periodically remobilized into debris flows. Significant structural mitigation would have to be built to reclaim use of the Highway 99 corridor and Squamish area.

== See also ==
- List of volcanoes in Canada
- List of Cascade volcanoes

== Notes ==
- [a] According to Hildreth's definitions, proximal relief refers to the difference between the summit elevation and the highest exposure of old rocks under the main edifice, while draping relief marks the difference between the summit elevation and the edifice's lowest distal lava flows (excluding pyroclastic and debris flows).
