= Pali Dome =

Mountain in British Columbia, Canada

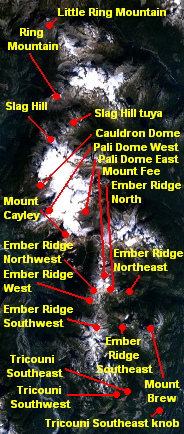
- Mount Cayley volcanic field

Highest point
- Listing: List of volcanoes in Canada List of Cascade volcanoes
- Coordinates: 50°8′13″N 123°18′25″W

Geography
- Location within British Columbia
- Location: British Columbia, Canada
- Parent range: Pacific Ranges

Geology
- Mountain type: Subglacial volcano
- Volcanic arc: Canadian Cascade Arc
- Volcanic belt: Garibaldi Volcanic Belt
- Volcanic field: Mount Cayley volcanic field
- Last eruption: Pleistocene/Holocene

Pali Dome is a subglacial volcano in the Pacific Ranges of the Coast Mountains in southwestern British Columbia, Canada. It is part of the Mount Cayley volcanic field and its elevation is 2,250 m (7,380 ft). For the past 2 million years, the Mount Cayley volcanic field has had interactions between ice and lava which have created some unique landforms and an in-ice drainage system."Pali" comes from the Hawaiian word that means cliff or steep hill, while dome refers to the lava dome, which is when doughy lava flows from a volcanic vent which is usually rounded and flat on top.

One of the last known eruptions of the Pali Dome was over 10,000 years ago.

== See also ==
- List of volcanoes in Canada
- Mount Cayley volcanic field
- Volcanism of Canada
- Volcanism of Western Canada
