= Cauldron Dome =

Volcano in British Columbia, Canada

Coordinates: 50°9′20″N 123°19′10″W

Cauldron Dome is a tuya in the Mount Cayley volcanic field, British Columbia, Canada. Cauldron Dome is made of coarsely plagioclase-orthophyroxene-phyric andesite lava flows and last erupted during the Holocene. It is in the Garibaldi Volcanic Belt, a portion of the Canadian Cascade Arc.

== See also ==
- List of volcanoes in Canada
- Volcanism of Canada
- Volcanism of Western Canada
