= Ring Mountain (British Columbia) =

Mountain in Canada

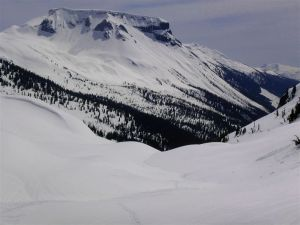

Highest point
- Elevation: 2,192 m (7,192 ft)
- Prominence: 260 m (850 ft)
- Coordinates: 50°13′17″N 123°17′58″W

Geography
- Location within British Columbia
- Location: British Columbia, Canada
- District: New Westminster Land District
- Parent range: Pacific Ranges
- Topo map: NTS 92J3 Brandywine Falls

Geology
- Rock age: Unknown
- Mountain type: Tuya
- Volcanic arc: Canadian Cascade Arc
- Volcanic belt: Garibaldi Volcanic Belt
- Volcanic field: Mount Cayley volcanic field
- Last eruption: Unknown

Climbing
- First ascent: 1968 John Clarke

Ring Mountain, also known as Crucible Dome, is a tuya in the Mount Cayley volcanic field, British Columbia, Canada. It features a horseshoe shaped crater on the east side of the upper Squamish River. Outcrops on Ring Mountain's western side contain highly variable, fine-scale jointing and are locally broken down into many small spires and knobs. The age of Ring Mountain is unknown, but it likely formed during the Fraser Glaciation, as did most tuyas in Canada.

== See also ==
- Mount Cayley
- Garibaldi Volcanic Belt
- Cascade Volcanoes
- Volcanism of Canada
- Volcanism of Western Canada
