= Ember Ridge =

Location of Ember Ridge in British Columbia

Ember Ridge is a volcanic mountain ridge associated with the Mount Cayley volcanic field in British Columbia, Canada. Ember Ridge is made of a series of steep-sided domes of glassy, complexly jointed, hornblende-phyric basalt with the most recent eruptions during the Holocene. The domes have structural similarities which indicate that the domes are similar in age and could have formed by the same foundation.

== Volcanoes ==
Lava domes associated with Ember Ridge include:

- Ember Ridge North (50°4′36″N 123°14′20″W)
- Ember Ridge Northeast (50°4′20″N 123°12′55″W)
- Ember Ridge Northwest (50°4′33″N 123°15′23″W)
- Ember Ridge Southeast (50°2′47″N 123°13′19″W)
- Ember Ridge Southwest (50°2′45″N 123°15′8″W)
- Ember Ridge West (50°4′2″N 123°15′41″W)

== See also ==
- Mount Cayley
- Cascade Volcanoes
- List of Cascade volcanoes
- List of volcanoes in Canada
- Volcanism of Canada
- Volcanism of Western Canada
