= Brandywine Falls Provincial Park =

Provincial park in British Columbia, Canada

- IUCN category II (national park)
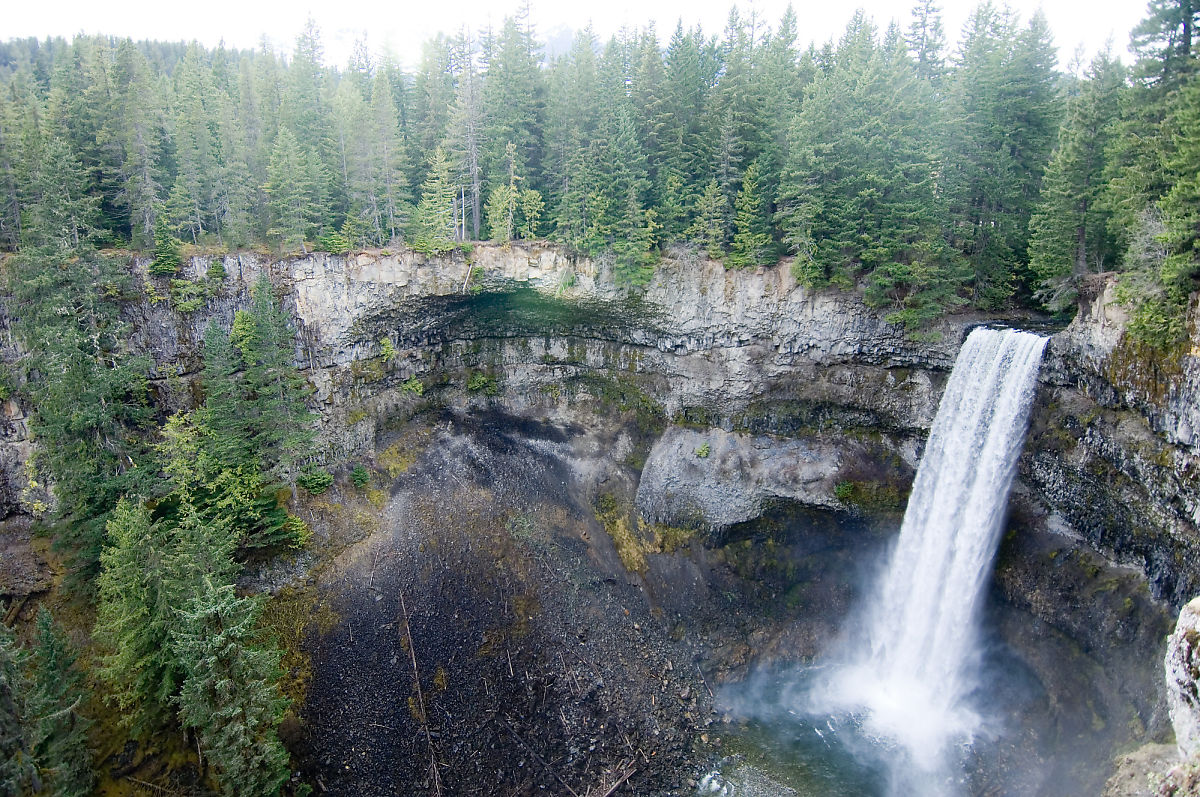
- Brandywine Falls (camera angle used has shortened the apparent height of the falls)
- Interactive map of Brandywine Falls Provincial Park
- Location: British Columbia, Canada
- Nearest city: Whistler
- Coordinates: 50°02′07″N 123°07′07″W
- Governing body: BC Parks

Brandywine Falls Provincial Park is a provincial park in British Columbia, Canada, located adjacent to BC Highway 99 between Garibaldi and Whistler, British Columbia. It is managed by Sea to Sky Parks for BC Parks.

== Falls ==
The 70-meter (230 ft) falls are located on Brandywine Creek, which has its origin in the Powder Mountain Icefield to the west, and are formed by the lip of a lava flow flanking the west bank of the Cheakamus River. Just downstream of the falls is Daisy Lake.

At least four basaltic lava flows of Late Pleistocene age comprise the vertical walls surrounding Brandywine Falls. These Cheakamus Valley basalts are part of the Garibaldi Volcanic Belt, a northwest-southeast chain of volcanoes and related lavas that form the northern end of the Cascade Volcanic Arc. The lava flowed over deposits of glacial till, silt, and gravel then cooled creating a hard weather resistant top cap over loose unconsolidated material easily weathered. The perfect conditions for a water fall creation. 10,000 years later ice from the Fraser Glaciation receded from Cheakamus Valley releasing melt water and creating Brandywine Creek. This worked its way downstream and started to erode the looser material and undercut the hard basalt top layer, creating the falls.

== History ==
The name Brandywine is believed to have come from a wager between two surveyors (Jack Nelson and Bob Mollison) for the Howe Sound and Northern Railway over the height of the Falls. The closest guess winning a bottle of brandy (wine). The height was measured with a chain and it was Mollison who won the bottle of brandy and Nelson then named the falls Brandywine.

Another explanation of the naming of the falls comes from around the 1890s when Charles Chandler and George Mitchell passed out there after drinking too much brandywine in their tea.

Around the early 1900s Brandywine Falls used to have a train station and many log cabins adjacent to the falls. Some cabins can still be seen in a dilapidated state by the side of the trail. As part of the improvements of Highway 99 for the 2010 Winter Olympics, the area was subject to many day-use improvements which replaced overnight camping with parking and picnic tables.

== See also ==
- List of waterfalls
- List of waterfalls in Canada
- List of waterfalls in British Columbia
