= Canadian Cascade Arc =

Canadian segment of the North American Cascade Volcanic Arc

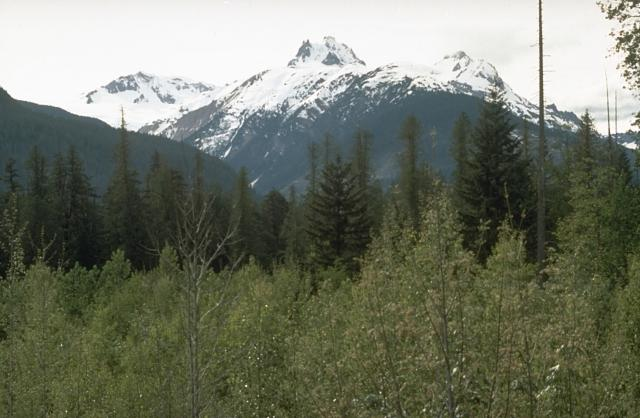
- The Mount Meager massif as seen from the Pemberton Valley. Summits left to right are Capricorn Mountain, Mount Meager and Plinth Peak.

Highest point
- Elevation: 3,160 m (10,370 ft)
- Coordinates: 51°31′42″N 126°06′48″W

Geography
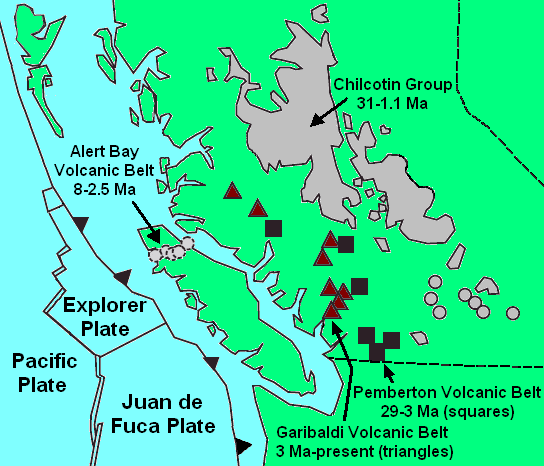
- Map of geological features comprising the Canadian Cascade Arc
- Location: British Columbia, Canada
- Parent range: Cascade Volcanic Arc

The Canadian Cascade Arc, also called the Canadian Cascades, is the Canadian segment of the North American Cascade Volcanic Arc. Located entirely within the Canadian province of British Columbia, it extends from the Cascade Mountains in the south to the Coast Mountains in the north. Specifically, the southern end of the Canadian Cascades begin at the Canada–United States border. However, the specific boundaries of the northern end are not precisely known and the geology in this part of the volcanic arc is poorly understood. It is widely accepted by geologists that the Canadian Cascade Arc extends through the Pacific Ranges of the Coast Mountains. However, others have expressed concern that the volcanic arc possibly extends further north into the Kitimat Ranges, another subdivision of the Coast Mountains, and even as far north as Haida Gwaii (formerly known as the Queen Charlotte Islands).

Over the last 29 million years, the Canadian Cascade Arc has been erupting a chain of volcanoes along the British Columbia Coast. At least four volcanic zones in British Columbia are related to Cascade Arc volcanism. This includes a large volcanic plateau in The Interior and three linear volcanic belts on The Coast. They were formed during different geological periods, separated by millions of years, and occur in three regions referred to as the back-arc, main-arc and fore-arc. The youngest of the three belts has been sporadically active over the last 4.0–3.0 million years, with the latest eruption having taken place possibly in the last 1,000 years. About 2,350 years ago, a major explosive eruption occurred, sending a massive ash column into the atmosphere. This is recognized as the largest volcanic eruption throughout Canada within the last 10,000 years.

In historical times, the Canadian Cascade Arc has been considerably less active than the American portion of the volcanic arc. It also has no records of historical eruptions. Nevertheless, the volcanic arc poses a threat to the surrounding region. Any volcanic hazard—ranging from landslides to eruptions—could pose a significant risk to humans and wildlife. Even though there are no historical eruptions in the Canadian Cascade Arc, eruptive activity is very likely to resume; if this were to happen, relief efforts would be quickly organized. Teams such as the Interagency Volcanic Event Notification Plan (IVENP) are prepared to notify people threatened by volcanic eruptions.

== Geology ==
=== Formation ===
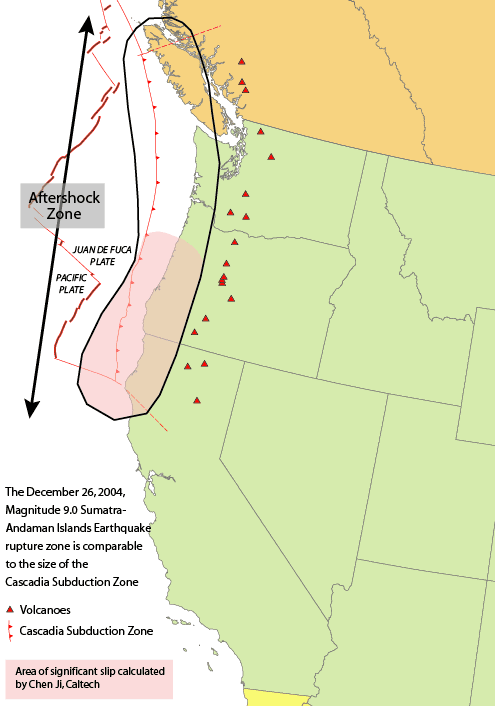
Area of the Cascadia subduction zone and the modern Cascade Volcanic Arc

The Cascade Arc was originally created by subduction of the now vanished Farallon Plate at the Cascadia subduction zone. After 28 million years ago, the Farallon Plate segmented to form the Juan de Fuca Plate, which continues to subduct under the Pacific Northwest of North America. In the last few million years, volcanism has declined along the volcanic arc. The probable explanation lies in the rate of convergence between the Juan de Fuca and North American plates. These two tectonic plates currently converge 3 to 4 cm (1.2 to 1.6 in) per year; this is only about half the rate of convergence from seven million years ago.

Because of the very large fault area, the Cascadia subduction zone can produce large earthquakes of magnitude 7.0 or greater. The interface between the Juan de Fuca and North American plates remains locked for periods of roughly 500 years. During these periods, stress builds up on the interface between the plates and causes uplift of the North American margin. When the plate finally slips, the 500 years of stored energy are released in a massive earthquake. The most recent, the 1700 Cascadia earthquake, was recorded in the oral traditions of the First Nations people on Vancouver Island. It caused considerable tremors and a massive tsunami that traveled across the Pacific Ocean. The significant shaking associated with this earthquake demolished houses of the Cowichan Tribes on Vancouver Island and caused several landslides. It also made it too difficult for the Cowichan people to stand, and the tremors were so lengthy that they were sickened. The earthquake-generated tsunami ultimately devastated a winter village at Pachena Bay, killing all the people that lived there. The 1700 Cascadia earthquake caused near-shore subsidence, submerging marshes and forests on the coast that were later buried under more recent debris.

Unlike most subduction zones worldwide, there is no deep oceanic trench present along the continental margin in Cascadia. The reason is that the mouth of the Columbia River empties directly into the subduction zone and deposits silt at the bottom of the Pacific Ocean, burying this large depression. Massive floods from prehistoric Glacial Lake Missoula during the Late Pleistocene also deposited large amounts of sediment into the small trench. However, as with other subduction zones, the outer margin is slowly being compressed like a giant spring. When the stored energy is suddenly released by slippage across the fault at irregular intervals, the Cascadia subduction zone can create very large earthquakes, such as the magnitude 9.0 Cascadia earthquake on January 26, 1700.

=== Main-arc volcanism ===
==== Pemberton Volcanic Belt ====
Volcanic activity of the main-arc began at the southern end of the Pemberton Volcanic Belt about 29 million years ago during the middle Oligocene epoch. It then shifted northwards to the Coquihalla region 22 million years ago, followed by volcanism near the town of Pemberton 16 to 17 million years ago. In the Salal Creek area, volcanic activity occurred 8.0 million years ago and the northernmost Pemberton Belt volcano formed 6.8 million years ago. The northward younging of Pemberton Belt volcanism indicates that a slab window edge was moving northward under British Columbia between at least the onset of arc volcanism 29 million years ago and eruption of the northernmost volcano 6.8 million years ago. The extensive Masset Formation on Haida Gwaii has been suggested by some scientists to be a northern extension of the Pemberton Volcanic Belt. However, the geochemistry and physical volcanology of the Masset Formation indicates that it formed in a rifting environment in contrast to other Pemberton Belt features.

Extensive erosion of the Pemberton Volcanic Belt has removed most of its volcanic peaks, exposing their magma systems. These form several intrusive bodies such as batholiths and stocks. The cessation of volcanism in the Pemberton Belt might have been caused by steepening of the subducted Juan de Fuca slab after the Explorer Plate formed about 6.0 million years ago. This change in tectonics created the modern Canadian Cascade Arc, as well as the Cascade Range and Olympic Mountains.

===== Chilliwack batholith =====
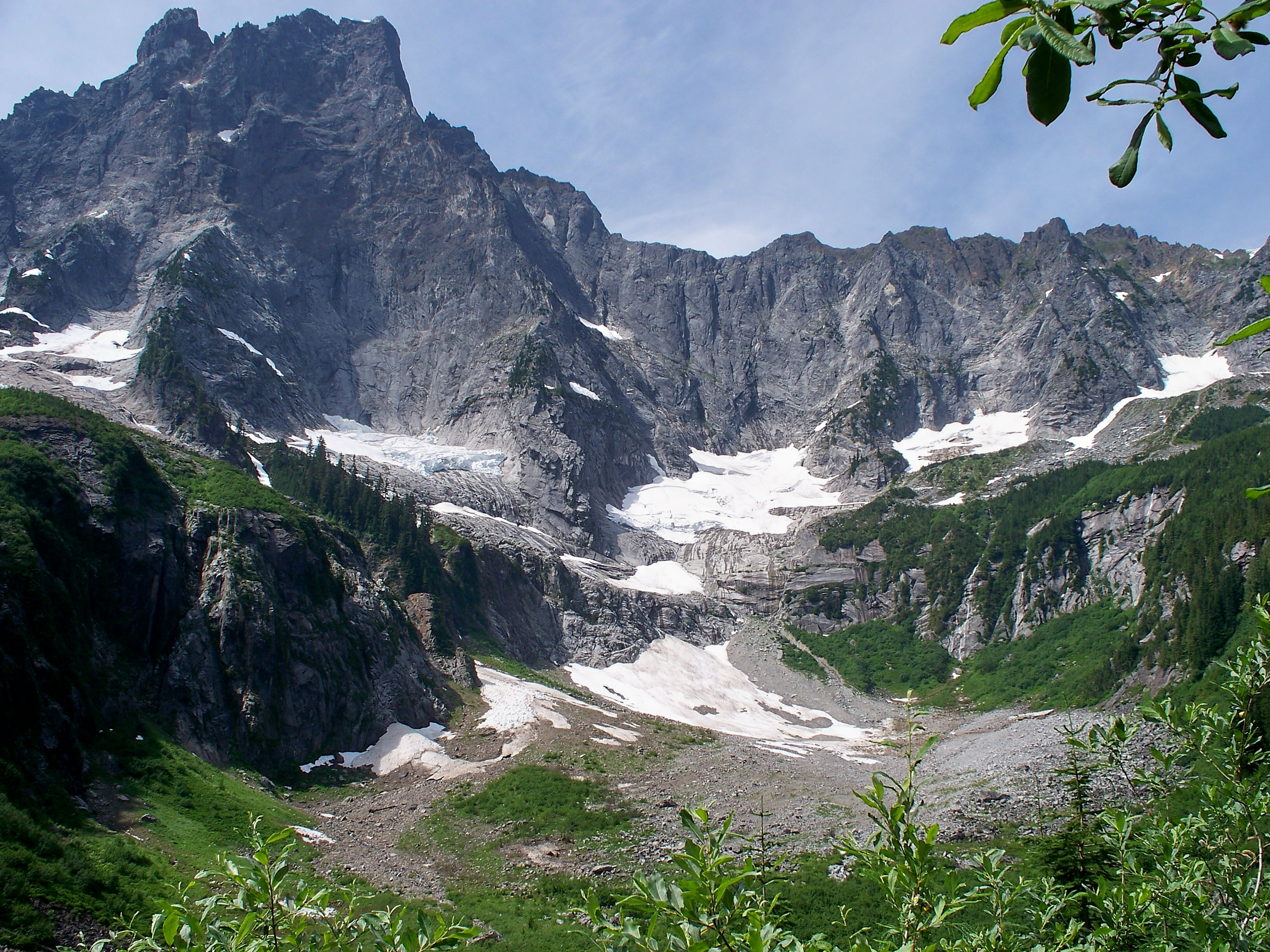
Most of Slesse Mountain in the Cascade Mountains is made of grey diorite of the Chilliwack batholith

The first volcanic event 29 million years ago formed intrusive rocks of the large Chilliwack batholith, which extends south into the U.S. state of Washington. In Canada, the batholith consists of rocks ranging from hypersthene quartz gabbro to albite granite. Three main plutons are present. The oldest and most extensive is an irregularly-zoned pluton composed of quartz diorite at the margins, grading inward through granodiorite to a small core of granite. This pluton is exposed on both sides of Chilliwack Lake, a narrow north–south trending lake in the Cascade Mountains. Two younger plutons, consisting of nearly homogeneous leucocratic biotite quartz monzonite, are situated north of Chilliwack Lake and 3.2 km (2.0 mi) east of Slesse Mountain.

===== Coquihalla Volcanic Complex =====
Volcanism 22 to 21 million years ago constructed the Coquihalla Volcanic Complex about 32 km (20 mi) northeast of Hope. It comprises volcanic and intrusive rocks that are calc-alkaline felsic to intermediate in composition. Coquihalla Mountain, the highest summit of the Bedded Range with an elevation of 2,157 m (7,077 ft), is a major preserved stratovolcano and represents one of the few remaining Miocene volcanoes in southwestern British Columbia. As a result, the Coquihalla Volcanic Complex has been a subject of geological studies to annunciate the remains of what might have been an extensive cover of volcanic rocks during the early Miocene epoch. The Coquihalla Complex also has a different igneous composition than Canadian Cascade Arc volcanoes that formed in the last two million years. Rhyolite tuffs are the primary igneous rocks comprising the Coquihalla Volcanic Complex, with small amounts of basalt or andesite present. This contrasts with modern Canadian Cascade volcanoes in that they are mainly composed of volcanic rocks in the basalt to andesite composition range, with few rocks of more felsic composition than dacite. Changes in magma composition have also occurred in the American portion of the Cascade Arc.

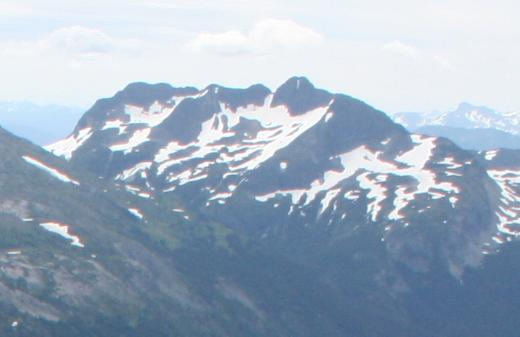
Coquihalla Mountain, a volcanic peak in the Pemberton Volcanic Belt that was active during the early Miocene epoch.

The Coquihalla Volcanic Complex began its formation when large pyroclastic flows were erupted on an erosional surface. Emptying of the shallow magma chamber caused tilting of the unconformity on the Eagle pluton, which is situated to the southeast. Concomitant with faulting, tilting and subsidence, avalanche breccias repeatedly slid off oversteepened exposures of the Pasayten Group and Eagle pluton. After volcanic activity deposited a 1,000 m (3,300 ft) thick sequence of pyroclastic rocks, a period of dormancy followed. It was during this time that localized conglomerate, sandstone and a large sheet of Pasayten clast breccia was deposited.

Subsequent eruptions produced pyroclastic flows, which were followed by another short break in volcanic activity. Vent clearing eruptions produced pyroclastic breccia, which linger on a mountain ridge north and east of Coquihalla Mountain. Movement along the Jim Kelly Creek fault ceased and subsequent pyroclastic flows filled and overflowed that edge of the basin. Later, numerous subvolcanic intrusions were emplaced and post-Miocene uplift tilted and warped the overlying volcanic rocks. Erosion removed what may have been extensive volcanic cover from the surrounding area and uncovered the buried domes and intrusions. Today, the Coquihalla Volcanic Complex covers an area of about 30 km^{2} (12 mi^{2}) and the volume of pyroclastic material is 50 km^{3} (12 mi^{3}). A large stock, composed of pyroxene diorite and biotite-pyroxene quartz diorite, forms the present base of Coquihalla Mountain.

===== Mount Barr Plutonic Complex =====
South of the Fraser River at Wahleach Lake is the Mount Barr Plutonic Complex. Named after Mount Barr in the Skagit Range of the Cascade Mountains, this plutonic complex ranges in age from 21 to 16 million years old. It consists of at least four plutons. The main pluton, comprising 80% of the complex, comprises felsic and intermediate intrusive rocks ranging from quartz diorite to quartz monzonite. It is roughly circular in shape, forming 1,907 m (6,257 ft) high Mount Barr. Subsequent magmatism created two younger stocks in the main pluton. The older stock consists of fine-grained biotite hornblende granodiorite while the younger stock comprises leucocratic biotite quartz monzonite. A 60 to 90 m (200 to 300 ft) wide dike, composed of granophyric hornblende plagioclase porphyry, is situated between quartz diorite of the Hope Plutonic Complex and Eocene conglomerate. It represents an offshoot of the main Mount Barr pluton. Just northwest of the main Mount Barr pluton is a biotite hornblende quartz diorite pluton near Hicks Lake. Because of its heterogeneity, it is only occasionally grouped as part of the Mount Barr Plutonic Complex.

===== Crevasse Crag Volcanic Complex =====
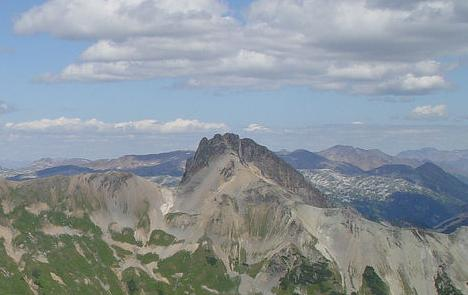
Chipmunk Mountain (middle), an extinct Miocene volcano that formed during the time of Pemberton Belt volcanism.

About 22 km (14 mi) southeast of Lillooet Lake is the Crevasse Crag Volcanic Complex. It is about 16 million years old, situated on the summit of a glaciated mountain ridge made of Late Cretaceous and younger intrusive rocks. These form part of the large Coast Plutonic Complex, which extends along the British Columbia Coast. The Crevasse Crag Volcanic Complex comprises volcanic breccias, tuffs and plagioclase-phyric flows. Analyses of major, trace and rare-earth elements indicate that dacite, andesite and basaltic andesite lava flows form its lower flanks.

===== Salal Creek Pluton =====
At the headwaters of Salal Creek is a roughly circular composite stock known as the Salal Creek Pluton. It is estimated to be 8.0 million years old, indicating that it is one of the youngest felsic plutons exposed in the Pacific Ranges. Like other Pemberton Belt plutons, the Salal Creek Pluton is generally thought by geologists to be the root of a deeply eroded volcano. Episodic eruptions may have formed a large dome, but rapid erosion to a depth of about 1 km (0.62 mi) has removed the overlying volcanic structure, exposing the 10 km (6.2 mi) wide Salal Creek Pluton. It is complex in structure, consisting of an older outer ring of coarse-grained quartz monzonite and a younger inner stock of finer-grained and porphyritic quartz monzonite. The pluton covers an area of 60 km^{2} (23 mi^{2}).

==== Garibaldi Volcanic Belt ====
After Pemberton Belt volcanism declined 4.0–3.0 million years ago, volcanic activity shifted westwards to form the younger Garibaldi Volcanic Belt. This represents the modern Canadian Cascade Arc, consisting of lava flows, lava domes, cinder cones, stratovolcanoes, subglacial volcanoes and volcanic plugs. Volcanic activity during the Fraser Glaciation between 25,000 and 10,000 years ago interacted with glacial ice to form subglacial domes, tuyas and ice-marginal lava flows. Since the Cordilleran Ice Sheet retreated about 10,000 years ago, eruptions have been mostly subaerial. The most recent explosive eruption occurred about 2,350 years ago and the latest effusive eruption took place less than 1,500 years ago.

Three echelon segments comprise the Garibaldi Volcanic Belt and are consequently referred to as the southern, central and northern segments. Each segment has at least one principal volcano along with several smaller edifices. The northern segment intersects the older Pemberton Volcanic Belt near the Mount Meager massif where it overlies uplifted and deeply eroded remains of Pemberton Belt subvolcanic plutons.

===== Southern segment =====
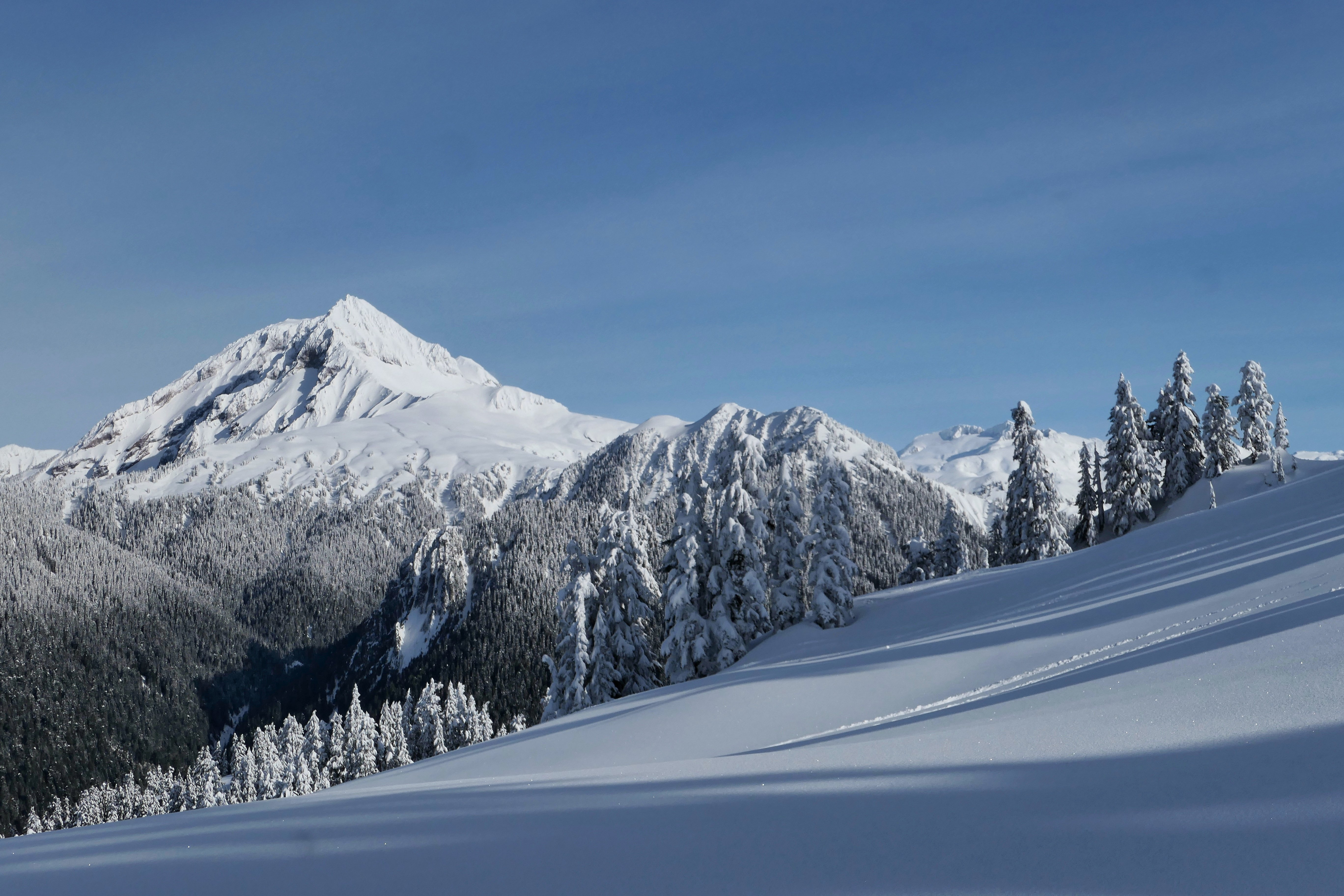
Mount Garibaldi as seen from the south

Three principal volcanoes comprise the southern segment along with several smaller edifies. The largest and youngest principal volcano, Mount Garibaldi, is a dissected stratovolcano that began its formation 250,000 years ago. This eruptive period built a broad composite cone made of dacite and breccia. Parts of this "proto-Garibaldi" or ancestral volcano are exposed on Garibaldi's lower northern and eastern flanks and on the upper 240 m (790 ft) of Brohm Ridge. Around where Columnar Peak and possibly Glacier Pikes are now located, a series of coalescing dacite lava domes were constructed. During the ensuing long period of dormancy, the Cheekye River cut a deep valley into the cone's western flank that was later filled with a glacier. After reaching its maximum extent the Cheekye Glacier and Cordilleran Ice Sheet were covered with volcanic ash and fragmental debris from Garibaldi. This period of growth began with the eruption of the Atwell Peak plug dome about 13,000 years ago from a ridge surrounded by the ice sheet. As the plug dome grew, massive sheets of broken lava crumbled as talus down its sides. Numerous Peléan pyroclastic flows accompanied these cooler avalanches, forming a 6.3 km^{3} (1.5 mi^{3}) fragmental cone and an overall slope of 12 to 15 degrees. Some of the glacial ice was melted by the eruptions, forming a small lake against Brohm Ridge's southern arm. The volcanic sandstones seen today atop Brohm Ridge were created by ash settling in this lake. Glacial overlap was most significant on the west and somewhat to the south. Subsequent melting of the Cordilleran Ice Sheet and its component glaciers initiated a series of avalanches and mudflows on Garibaldi's western flank that moved nearly half of the original cone's volume into the Squamish Valley where it covers 26 km^{2} (10 mi^{2}) to a thickness of about 91 m (299 ft). Gaps left by melting ice caused minor to moderate cone distortion where the Cordilleran Ice Sheet was thin and major distortion where it was thick. The ice was thickest in and thus cone distortion was greatest over the buried Cheekye valley. Later volcanism occurred from Dalton Dome, which forms Garibaldi's western summit. Lava flows mantled the landslide headwall on Garibaldi's western flank. Around the same time, a voluminous dacite lava flow from Opal Cone travelled 20 km (12 mi) down Ring Creek on Garibaldi's southeastern flank without encountering any residual glacial ice. These latest eruptions of Mount Garibaldi occurred in the early Holocene shortly after remains of the Cordilleran Ice Sheet retreated in regional valleys between 10,700 and 9,300 years ago.

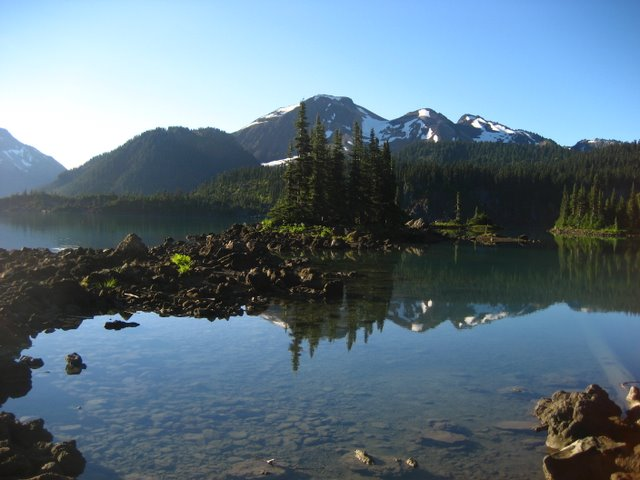
Mount Price and one of the Battleship Islands reflected in the clear water of Garibaldi Lake

Mount Price, one of the three principal volcanoes in the southern segment, formed during three periods of eruptive activity. The first eruptive period 1.2 million years ago constructed a hornblende andesite stratovolcano on the floor of a cirque-like basin. During the Middle Pleistocene about 300,000 years ago, volcanism shifted westward and constructed the nearly symmetrical stratovolcano of Mount Price. Episodic eruptions produced andesite and dacite lavas, as well as pyroclastic flows from Peléan activity. Later, the volcano was overridden by the Cordilleran Ice Sheet. After the ice sheet had retreated from higher elevations, andesite eruptions from a satellite vent created a small lava dome on Price's northern flank. Possibly contemporaneous volcanism occurred at Clinker Peak about 10,000 years ago with the eruption of two hornblende-biotite andesite lava flows. They are both over 250 m (820 ft) thick and 6 km (3.7 mi) long, extending to the northwest and southwest. The unusually large thickness of these lava flows is from them ponding and cooling against the Cordilleran Ice Sheet when it still filled valleys at lower elevations. This was the last eruptive activity at Mount Price.

The Black Tusk, the oldest and most striking of the three principal volcanoes, is the glacially dissected remains of a stratovolcano that formed between 1.3 and 1.1 million years ago. Eruptions produced hornblende andesite lava flows and lithic tuffs. Prolonged erosion destroyed the original cone. The bluffs northwest, southwest and southeast of the main volcanic edifice are remains of this ancestral volcano. Renewed volcanism between 210,000 and 170,000 years ago produced hypersthene andesite lava flows, which locally terminate with precipitous 100 m (330 ft) thick ice-contact margins. This latest eruptive activity culminated with extrusion of an endogenous dome and related lava which form the present 2,316 m (7,598 ft) high summit spire. Later, the Cordilleran Ice Sheet carved a deep, north-trending U-shaped valley into the eastern flank of this edifice.

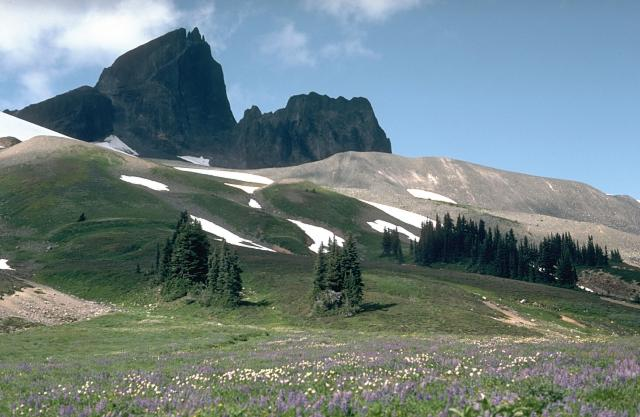
The Black Tusk towering above a flower-covered mountain meadow. The light-coloured ridge to the right is a glacial moraine.

The Table, a hornblende andesite tuya situated about 3 km (1.9 mi) southeast of Mount Price, rises precipitously 305 m (1,001 ft) above glaciated basement rocks. It was formed by volcanic eruptions that thawed through the Cordilleran Ice Sheet. The lava capping The Table was extruded after the volcano was built above lake level. Absence of glacial erratics on its summit and lack of erosional features attributable to glaciation indicates that The Table was formed by subglacial eruptions during the Early Holocene time, just prior to the disappearance of the ice sheet.

Cinder Cone, a volcanic cone composed of ash, lapilli and scattered ropy and breadcrusted bomb fragments, was constructed during two periods of eruptive activity. The first eruptive period produced a tuff ring and a 9 km (5.6 mi) long basaltic andesite lava flow about 100,000 years ago following a period of glacial retreat. Strombolian eruptions during the second and final eruptive period about 10,000 years ago constructed a small pyroclastic cone on the eastern rim of the older basaltic andesite tuff ring. A 9 km (5.6 mi) long lava flow, ranging from basalt to mugearite, issued from the base of the cone and travelled in a north-trending U-shaped valley on the eastern flank of The Black Tusk.

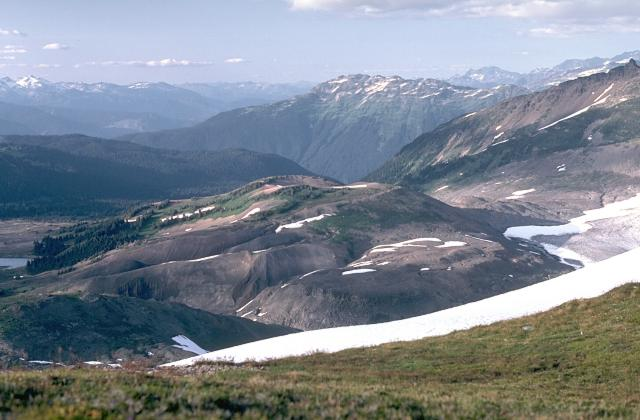
Cinder Cone

The Monmouth Creek complex on the west side of the Squamish River mouth is a prominent and enigmatic edifice composed of basaltic andesite and dacite of unknown age. It may represent a group of dikes and lava domes that formed subglacially. At least four dikes protrude its summit. These form the ribs of 60 to 180 m (200 to 590 ft) high lava spines, the tallest being The Castle, which contains horizontal and radiating columnar joints. The spines are covered by welded breccia close to their bases and columnar jointing extends into the welded sequence. The most elevated lava flows and spines are composed of dacite.

Along the northeastern shore of Howe Sound is a small outcrop of volcanic rock known as the Watts Point volcanic centre. It is the southernmost volcano in the Garibaldi Volcanic Belt, comprising about 0.02 km^{3} (0.0048 mi^{3}) of hornblende, pyroxene and sparsely porphyritic dacite lava and breccia. The dacite is characterized by columnar joints, 5 to 40 cm (2.0 to 15.7 in) in diameter, and exhibiting locally radiating patterns. This volcanic centre formed in a subglacial to englacial environment between 130,000 and 90,000 years ago, as shown by the existence of distinctive, radial columnar joint patterns, a glassy to fine-grained matrix and stratigraphic relationships to overlying glacial till.

===== Central segment =====
Volcanism in the central segment began at least 4.0 million years ago at deeply dissected Mount Cayley. This eruptive period, lasting until 0.6 million years ago, produced dacite lava flows and pyroclastic breccia. A central plug dome forming the summit spires of Mount Cayley represents the youngest feature that formed during this eruptive period. Subsequent activity 0.3–0.2 million years ago began with the eruption of a dacite lava flow into the Shovelnose Creek valley. This resulted in the formation of two small lava domes. Mount Fee is a 1 km (0.62 mi) long and 0.25 km (0.16 mi) wide spine of rhyodacite situated on a mountain ridge east of the Squamish River. Like Mount Cayley, it predates the appearance of the Cordilleran Ice Sheet. Other volcanoes in the central segment, such as Slag Hill, Ember Ridge, Cauldron Dome, Pali Dome and Ring Mountain, were formed when lava came into contact with the Cordilleran Ice Sheet. They are similar in structure to tuyas, displaying oversteepened ice-contact margins.

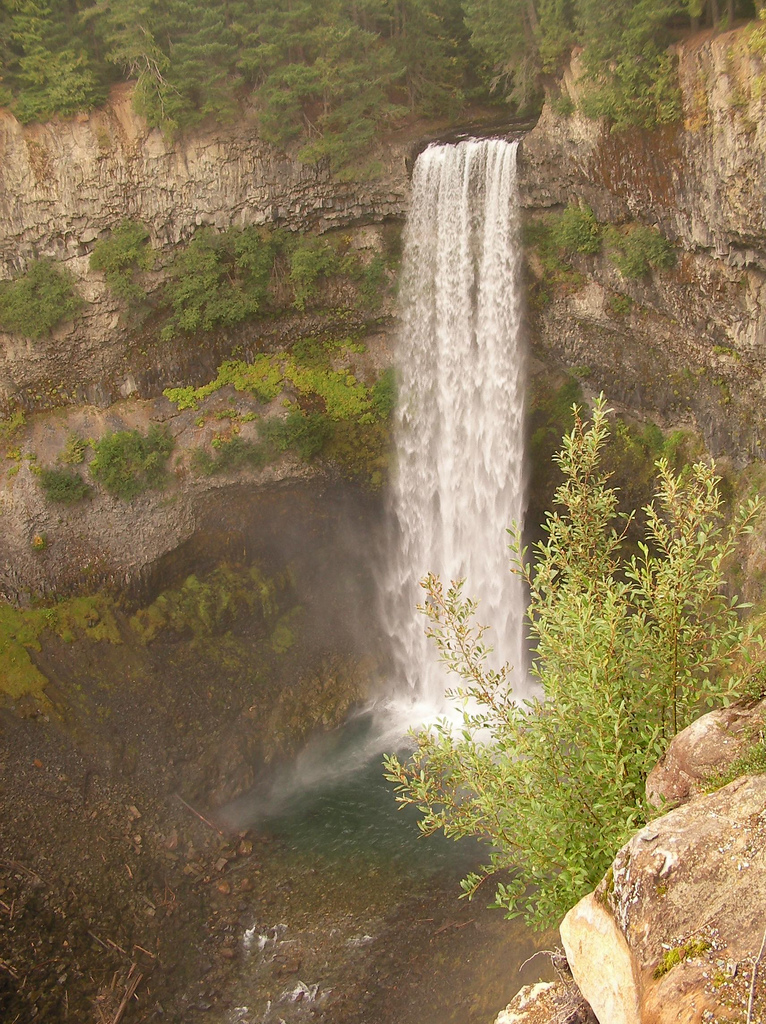
Brandywine Falls and columnar-jointed basalt lava flows

At least two sequences of basaltic andesite lava flows are deposited south of Tricouni Peak. One of these sequences, known as Tricouni Southwest, creates a cliff on the eastern side of a north–south trending channel with a depth of 200 m (660 ft) adjacent to the High Falls Creek mouth. The eastern flank of the lava flow, outside the High Falls Creek channel, has a more constant structure. Several fine-scale columnar joints and the overall structure of the lava flow suggest that its western portion, along the length of the channel, ponded against glacial ice. Near its southern unit, lava oozed into cracks in the glacial ice. This has been identified by the existence of spire-like cooling formations, although many of these edifices have been destroyed by erosional processes. Other features that indicate the lava ponded against glacial ice include its unusually thick structure and its steep cliffs. Therefore, the Tricouni Southwest lava flow was erupted about 10,000 years ago when the regional Fraser Glaciation was retreating. The explanation for the western portion displaying ice-contact features while the eastern portion does not is likely because its western flank lies in a north–south trending channel, which would have been able to maintain smaller amounts of solar heat than its unsheltered eastern flank. As a result, the western portion of the lava flow records glaciation during a period when the eastern slopes were free from glacial ice. Tricouni Southeast, the other volcanic sequence south of Tricouni Peak, consists of at least four andesite or dacite lava flows that outcrop as several small cliffs and bluffs on extensively vegetated flanks. They reach thicknesses of 100 m (330 ft) and contain small amounts of hyaloclastite. The feeder of their origins has not been discovered but is likely located at the summit of the mound. These lavas form ice-marginal edifies, suggesting that every lava flow was erupted about 10,000 years ago when the vast Cordilleran Ice Sheet was retreating and remains of glacial ice were sparse.

Exposed along the Cheakamus River and its tributaries are the Cheakamus Valley basalts. At least four basaltic flows comprise the sequence and were deposited during periods of volcanic activity from an unknown vent between 0.01 and 1.6 million years ago. Pillow lava is abundant along the bases the flows, some of which are underlain by hyaloclastite breccia. In 1958, Canadian volcanologist Bill Mathews suggested that the lava flows were erupted during periods of subglacial activity and traveled through trenches or tunnels melted in glacial ice of the Fraser Glaciation. Mathews based this on the age of the underlying glacial till, the existence of pillow lava close to the bottom of some lavas, indicating subaqueous volcanism, the columnar jointing at the edges of the lavas, indicating rapid cooling, and the absence of apparent palaeogeography.

===== Northern segment =====
The northern segment consists of one large volcanic complex, the Mount Meager massif, and a group of basaltic and andesitic volcanoes known as the Bridge River Cones. Mount Meager is composed of at least four overlapping stratovolcanoes that become progressively younger from south to north. These were formed in the last 2.2 million years, with the latest eruption having been about 2,350 years ago. The mafic, intermediate and felsic volcanic rocks comprising Meager were erupted from at least eight volcanic vents.

Extending north of the Mount Meager massif almost to the Interior Plateau are the Bridge River Cones. This group of small volcanoes on the upper Bridge River includes stratovolcanoes, volcanic plugs and lava flows. These volcanoes are unlike others throughout the Garibaldi Belt in that they are mainly composed of volcanic rocks with mafic compositions, including alkaline basalt and hawaiite. The different magma compositions might be related to a smaller degree of partial melting in the Earth's mantle or a descending plate edge effect. The oldest volcano in the group, known as Sham Hill, is a 60 m (200 ft) high volcanic plug with a potassium-argon date of one million years. It is about 300 m (980 ft) wide and its uncovered glaciated surface is strewn with glacial erratics. Its massive level rock columns were constructed inside the main volcanic vent of a stratovolcano that has since been reduced by erosion. To the southeast, the Salal Glacier volcanic complex was constructed between 970,000 and 590,000 years ago. It consists of subaerial tephra and thin lava flow deposits that are surrounded by 100 m (330 ft) thick ice-ponded lava flows. These ice-marginal lava flows were created when lava ponded against glacial ice in the nearby valleys before the Wisconsin Glaciation. North of the Salal Glacier complex lies a small basaltic stratovolcano named Tuber Hill. It began to form about 600,000 years ago when adjacent valleys were filled by glacial ice. When lava flows were erupted from Tuber Hill, they interacted with the valley-filling glaciers on its southern flank and produced a glacial meltwater lake. Here, more than 150 m (490 ft) of stacked hyaloclastite, lahars and lacustrine tuff were deposited. A series of pillow lavas were also deposited during this eruptive period. The most recent volcanic activity in the Bridge River volcanic field produced a series of basaltic lava flows in the regional valleys that overlie till of the last glacial period. The age of these valley-filling lava flows is unknown but the presence of unconsolidated glacial till under the flows suggests that they are less than 1,500 years old.

==== Disputed volcanic features ====
At least two volcanoes and one volcanic group may have formed as a result of Canadian Cascade Arc volcanism. The oldest feature, the Franklin Glacier Complex, is a deeply eroded 20 km (12 mi) long and 6 km (3.7 mi) wide geological structure with an elevation of over 2,000 m (6,600 ft). It consists of dikes and subvolcanic intrusions overlain by tuffs, dacite breccia and eroded remains of a 450 m (1,480 ft) thick sequence of hornblende andesite lava flows. These were formed about 6.8 and 3.5 million years ago, indicating that a period of inactivity occurred between these events for at least 3.3 million years. Because the Franklin Glacier Complex has not been studied in detail by scientists, very little is known about it. The oldest known magmatic event, 6.8 million years ago, is consistent with volcanism of the Pemberton Volcanic Belt. Therefore, it can be considered one of the northernmost zones of this geological feature. However, the youngest event, about 3.5 million years old, correspondes with the shift from Pemberton to Garibaldi activity. This indicates that the Franklin Glacier Complex can be considered part of the Pemberton Volcanic Belt or the Garibaldi Volcanic Belt.

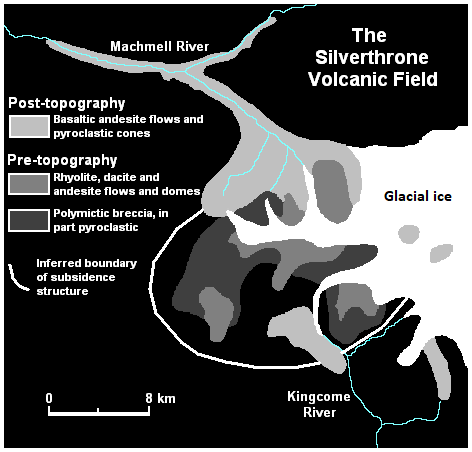
Geological map of the Silverthrone Caldera complex. This image displays three volcanic phases, as well as an outline of the caldera.

About 55 km (34 mi) north-northwest of the Franklin Glacier Complex is the deeply dissected Silverthrone Caldera. It is 20 km (12 mi) wide, with steep slopes extending from near sea level to a maximum elevation of 3,160 m (10,370 ft). Like Franklin to the south-southeast, Silverthrone has not been studied in detail by scientists. As a result, its affinity and eruptive history is poorly known. It is considered to be part of the Garibaldi Volcanic Belt, but it also lies on the overlapping trend of the much older Pemberton Volcanic Belt. At least three phases of volcanic activity have been identified at Silverthrone. The first phase, following collapse of the caldera, deposited a thick sequence of undated basal breccia. It contains irregular subvolcanic intrusions, as well as a profusion of dikes. In some places, the basal breccia has been welded together by intense volcanic heat. Subsequent activity 750,000 to 400,000 years ago constructed rhyolite, dacite and andesite lava domes, breccia and lava flows. Silverthrone Mountain, a volcanic peak associated with the Silverthrone Caldera, consists of overlapping andesite and rhyolite lava domes that were formed during this eruptive period. The third phase, less than 1,000 years ago, produced cinder cones, pyroclastic deposits and basaltic andesite lava flows that issued from vents on the rim of the caldera. Most of this activity occurred on the northern rim where lava flows traveled down the Pashleth Creek valley then into the Machmell River valley. The entire lava flow sequence is at least 25 km (16 mi) long, ranging in elevation from 2,000 m (6,600 ft) to 100 m (330 ft). Many of the volcanic products are now buried under glacial ice. However, remains of cinder cones protrude through glaciers and lava flows are exposed at lower elevations, such as the extensive Machmell-Pashleth Creek lava flow. A relatively small basaltic andesite lava flow extends from the caldera's southern rim into the headwaters of the Kingcome River.

The Milbanke Sound Group in the Kitimat Ranges consists of young lava flows and monogenetic cinder cones that were probably formed in the last 10,000 years. Like Silverthrone and Franklin, little is known about the Milbanke Sound Group. As a result, its affinity also remains unclear. It may reflect a northern extension of the Garibaldi Volcanic Belt, but there is not enough data to support this hypothesis. Its formation might have also resulted from other tectonic processes that are currently not understood. Swindle Island contains a 250 m (820 ft) high symmetrical cinder cone on its southern shoreline. This volcano, known as Kitasu Hill, comprises tephra and volcanic bombs. Its summit contains a volcanic crater that is breached to the east. Helmet Peak, a steep-sided cinder cone on Lake Island with an elevation of 335 m (1,099 ft), consists of welded volcanic blocks and basaltic feeder dikes. During eruption, basaltic tuff breccia was deposited throughout Lake Island and nearby Lady Douglas Island. Lava flows on the shores of Price Island and Dufferin Island were erupted from forest-covered basalt cones, which have been reduced in size to small volcanic mounds. Basaltic lava flows on Finngal Island comprise well-developed columnar jointing. Like other volcanic deposits in the Milbanke Sound Group, very little is known about these lava flows. Although the Milbanke Sound Group was probably formed in the last 10,000 years, the exact age of the lava flows and cinder cones is unknown. It probably formed in the last 10,000 years because the volcanic formations have minimal erosion, indicative of post-glacial volcanism.

=== Back-arc volcanism ===
Paralleling the Canadian Cascade Arc 150 km (93 mi) to the northeast is an area composed of minor basaltic lava flows. This zone, known as the Chilcotin Group, formed as a result of back-arc basin volcanism behind the Canadian Cascade Arc, in response to ongoing Cascadia subduction. Volcanic activity began 31 million years ago, but most of the volcanism occurred during two younger magmatic periods, the first between 6.0 and 10 million years ago and the other between 2.0 and 3.0 million years ago. This indicates that most Chilcotin Group volcanism corresponded with volcanism in the Pemberton Belt, although some of the younger Chilcotin lavas were erupted during early stages of Garibaldi Belt volcanism. A few volcanic eruptions have occurred in the Chilcotin Group in the last 1.6 million years.

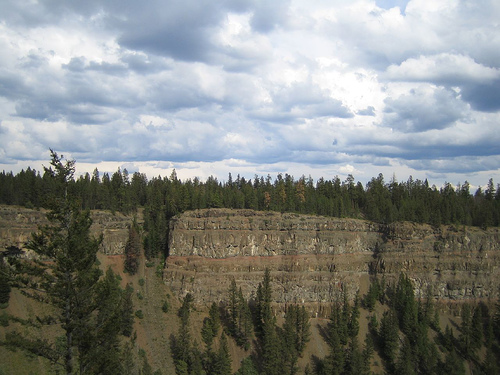
Cliff-forming flood basalts in Chasm Provincial Park

The flat-lying Chilcotin Group lava plateau covers an area of 25,000 km^{2} (9,700 mi^{2}) and a volume of 1,800 km^{3} (430 mi^{3}). It consists of several thin, flat-lying pāhoehoe lava flows that were erupted from a chain of low-profile shield volcanoes, which have since been eroded by Late Pleistocene glaciation to expose their gabbro-bearing volcanic plugs. The lava plateau has a maximum thickness of 140 m (460 ft) with at least 20 lava flows exposed in stratigraphic units. Specific lava flows normally extend over 1 km (0.62 mi) and reach a thickness of 10 m (33 ft). But in some areas, lava flows reach thicknesses of 70 m (230 ft).

A number of pillow lava and pillow breccia deposits are exposed throughout the Chilcotin Group. Pyroclastic fall deposits, composed of lapilli, were erupted from volcanoes in the Pemberton Belt and are overlain by subsequent basaltic lava flows. Lava flows from volcanism between 16 and 14 million years ago outcrop adjacent to the margins of the current lava plateau, which consists largely of basalts that were erupted between 10 and 6.0 million years ago. More recent lava flows are exposed in cliffs along the Fraser Canyon. These were erupted between 3.0 and 1.0 million years ago and the volcanic vents they were erupted from have not been discovered.

=== Fore-arc volcanism ===
Fore-arc volcanism was active on northern Vancouver Island 8.0 to 2.5 million years ago. This created a line of volcanic rocks and subvolcanic intrusions known as the Alert Bay Volcanic Belt. Named after the village of Alert Bay on Cormorant Island, it extends from the Brooks Peninsula in the southwest to the town of Port McNeill in the northeast. Geometry and chronometry studies indicate that the Alert Bay Belt formed at a descending plate edge. At the time of its formation, the Nootka Fault was probably coincident with the western end of the Alert Bay Belt, which is now 80 km (50 mi) to the northeast. Volcanic features in the Alert Bay Belt include Twin Peaks, Cluxewe Mountain and Haddington Island.

There is evidence that volcanic activity in the Alert Bay Belt migrated eastwards with time, as well as a shift from basalt to dacite or rhyolite volcanism. The first volcanic event, about 8.0 million years ago, occurred at the Brooks Peninsula, but most of the volcanoes were active about 3.0 million years ago. Most of the Alert Bay Belt volcanism corresponded with rapid changes in the geometry of Cascadia subduction and a hiatus in mainland Cascade Arc activity. The latest volcanic event 2.5 million years ago occurred at Cluxewe Mountain, which consists of dacite lava.

=== Geothermal and seismic activity ===
At least four volcanoes have had seismic activity since 1985, including Mount Garibaldi (three events), Mount Cayley (four events), Mount Meager massif (seventeen events) and the Silverthrone Caldera (two events). Seismic data suggest that these volcanoes still contain active magma chambers, indicating that some Garibaldi Belt volcanoes are likely active, with significant potential hazards. The seismic activity corresponds with some of Canada's recently formed volcanoes and with persistent volcanoes that have had major explosive activity throughout their history, such as Mount Garibaldi, Mount Cayley and the Mount Meager massif.

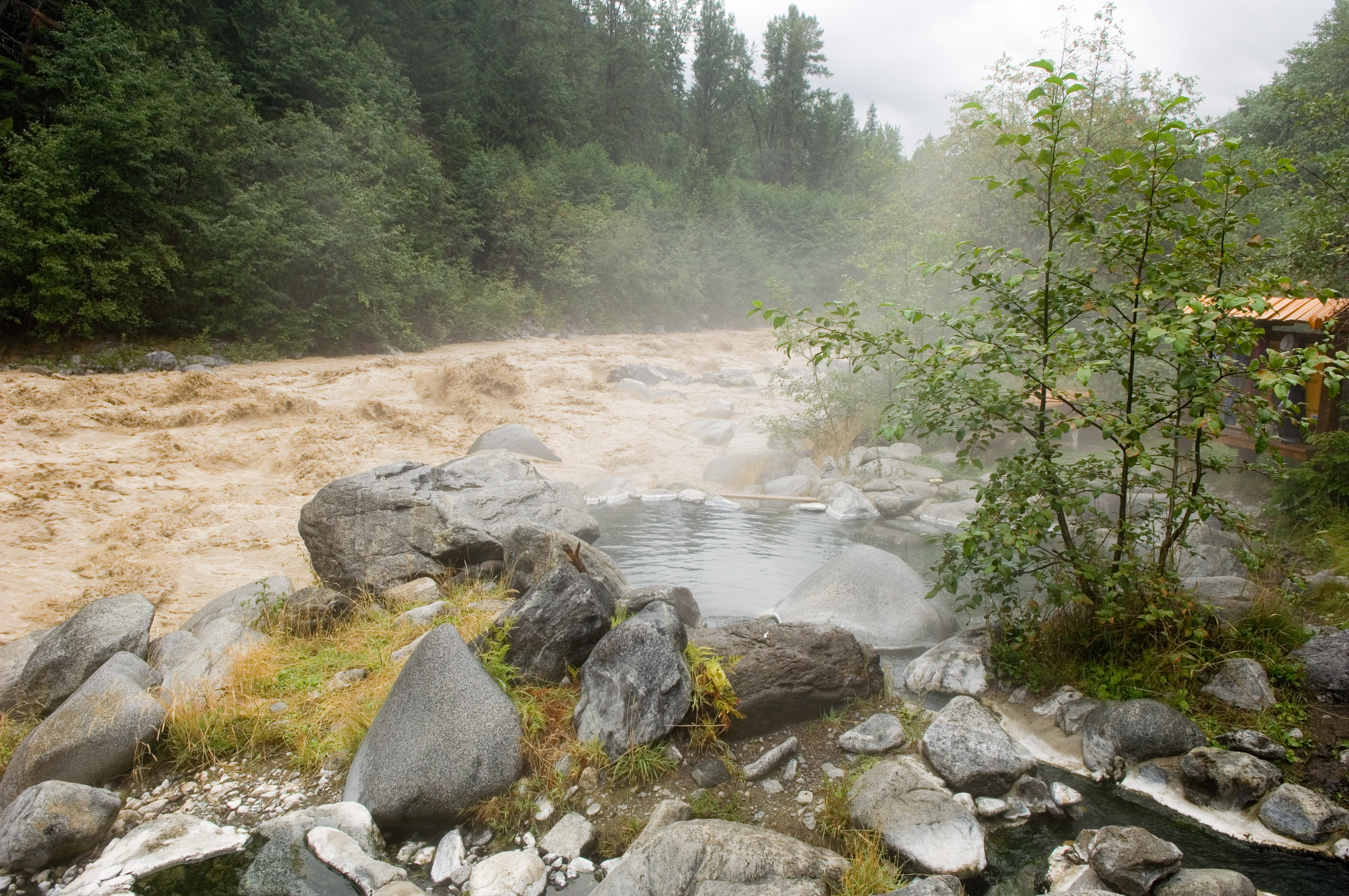
A volcanic hot spring near Meager Creek related to volcanism at the Mount Meager massif

A series of hot springs adjacent to the Lillooet River valley, such as the Harrison, Sloquet, Clear Creek and Skookumchuck springs, are not known to occur near areas with recent volcanic activity. Instead, many are located near 16–26 million year old intrusions of the Pemberton Volcanic Belt. The relationship of these hot springs to the Garibaldi Volcanic Belt is not clear. However, a few hot springs are known to exist in areas that have experienced relatively recent volcanic activity. About five hot springs exist at Mount Cayley and two small groups of hot springs are present at the Mount Meager massif. The springs at Meager might be evidence of a shallow magma chamber beneath the surface. No hot springs are known to exist at Mount Garibaldi like those found at the Mount Meager and Mount Cayley massifs, although there is evidence of abnormal high heat flow at the adjacent Table Meadows and other locations. Abnormal warm water adjacent to Britannia Beach could be geothermal activity linked to the Watts Point volcanic centre.

== Human history ==
=== Protection and monitoring ===
A number of volcanic features in the Canadian Cascade Arc are protected by provincial parks. Garibaldi Provincial Park was established in 1927 to protect the abundant geological history, glaciated mountains and other natural resources in the region. It was named after the 2,678 m (8,786 ft) high stratovolcano of Mount Garibaldi, which in turn was named after the Italian military and political leader Giuseppe Garibaldi in 1860. To the northwest, Brandywine Falls Provincial Park protects Brandywine Falls, a 70 m (230 ft) high waterfall composed of at least four basaltic lava flows with columnar joints. Its name origin is unclear, but it may have originated from two surveyors named Jack Nelson and Bob Mollison.

No volcanoes in the Canadian Cascade Arc are monitored closely enough by the Geological Survey of Canada to ascertain how active their magma systems are. The Canadian National Seismograph Network has been established to monitor earthquakes throughout Canada, but it is too far away to provide a good indication of what is happening under them. It may sense an increase in seismic activity they become very restless, but this may only provide a warning for a large eruption. It might detect activity only once a volcano has started erupting. If they were to erupt, relief efforts would probably be orchestrated. The Interagency Volcanic Event Notification Plan (IVENP) was created to outline the notification procedure of some of the main agencies that would be involved in response to an erupting volcano in Canada, an eruption close to the Canada–United States border or any eruption that will have effects in Canada.

== See also ==
- Geology of the Pacific Northwest
- List of Cascade volcanoes
- List of volcanoes in Canada
- Volcanology of Western Canada
