= Eaton Peak =

Mountain in the country of Canada

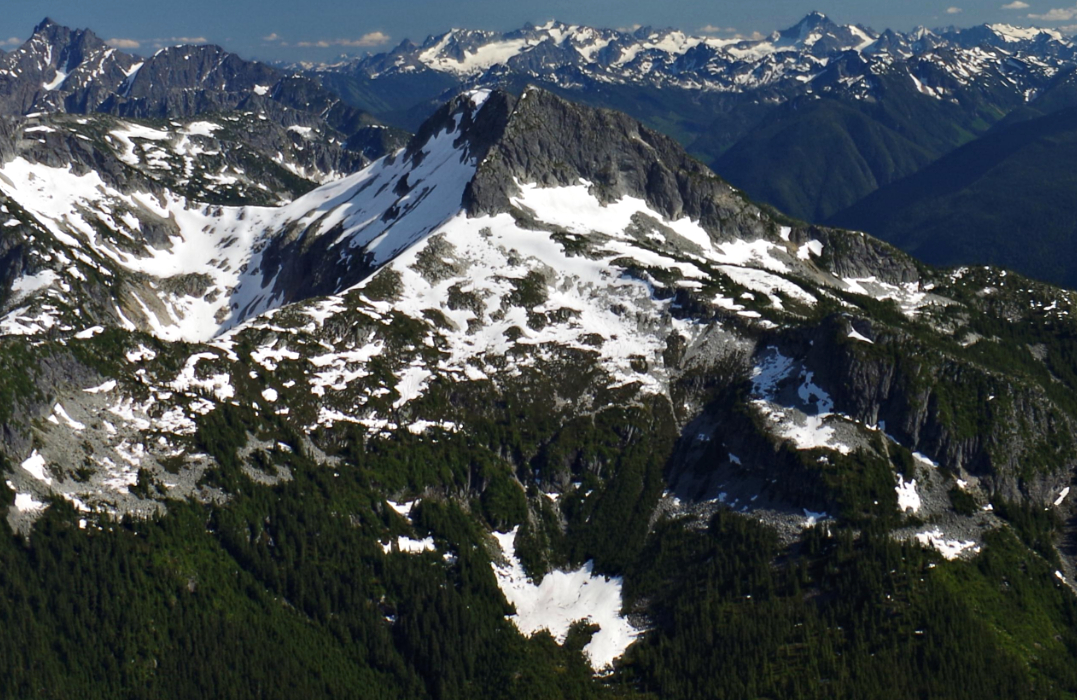
- North aspect of Eaton Peak seen from Mt. Grant

Highest point
- Elevation: 2,117 m (6,946 ft)
- Prominence: 387 m (1,270 ft)
- Parent peak: Silvertip Mountain
- Listing: Mountains of British Columbia
- Coordinates: 49°14′15″N 121°20′49″W

Geography
- Location within British Columbia Location within Canada
- Interactive map of Eaton Peak
- Location: British Columbia, Canada
- District: Yale Division Yale Land District
- Parent range: Skagit Range; Canadian Cascades
- Topo map: NTS 92H3 Skagit River

Geology
- Rock type: Intrusive

Climbing
- First ascent: 1950 J. Butcher, F. Rodgers, E. Jenkins
- Easiest route: Scrambling via West Ridge

Eaton Peak is a 2,117-metre (6,946-foot) double summit mountain located in the Canadian Cascades of southwestern British Columbia, Canada. It is situated 17 km (11 mi) southeast of Hope, 3 km (2 mi) south of Mt. Grant, and 12.6 km (8 mi) northwest of Silvertip Mountain. The peak was first climbed in 1950 by J. Butcher, F. Rodgers, and E. Jenkins. The peak was named to honor Canadian Army Private Douglas B. Eaton (1911-1944), from nearby Chilliwack, who was killed in action in World War II. The mountain's name was officially adopted April 7, 1955, by the Geographical Names Board of Canada. Nearby Eaton Creek and Eaton Lake were named in memory of his younger brother, William, also killed in action a year earlier. Precipitation runoff from the peak drains into Silverhope Creek, a tributary of the Fraser River.

== Geology ==
Eaton Peak is related to the Chilliwack batholith, which intruded the region 26 to 29 million years ago after the major orogenic episodes in the region. This is part of the Pemberton Volcanic Belt, an eroded volcanic belt that formed as a result of subduction of the Farallon Plate starting 29 million years ago.

During the Pleistocene period dating back over two million years ago, glaciation advancing and retreating repeatedly scoured the landscape leaving deposits of rock debris. The U-shaped cross section of the river valleys is a result of recent glaciation. Uplift and faulting in combination with glaciation have been the dominant processes which have created the tall peaks and deep valleys of the North Cascades area.

The North Cascades features some of the most rugged topography in the Cascade Range with craggy peaks and ridges, deep glacial valleys, and granite spires. Geological events occurring many years ago created the diverse topography and drastic elevation changes over the Cascade Range leading to various climate differences which lead to vegetation variety defining the ecoregions in this area.

== Climate ==
Most weather fronts originate in the Pacific Ocean, and travel east toward the Cascade Range where they are forced upward by the range (Orographic lift), causing them to drop their moisture in the form of rain or snowfall. As a result, the Cascade Mountains experience high precipitation, especially during the winter months in the form of snowfall. Temperatures can drop below −20 °C with wind chill factors below −30 °C. The months July through September offer the most favorable weather for climbing Eaton Peak.

== Climbing Routes ==
Established climbing routes on Eaton Peak:

- West Ridge - class 3
- Southeast Ridge
- North Ridge

== See also ==
- Geography of the North Cascades
