= Franklin Glacier Complex =

Volcano in the Waddington Range of southwestern British Columbia, Canada

Coordinates: 51°20′N 125°24′W

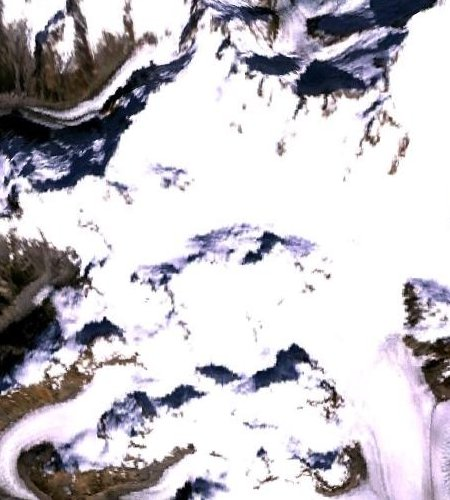
- Satellite image of the Franklin Glacier Complex

Highest point
- Elevation: 2,000+ m (6,600+ ft)

Dimensions
- Length: 20 km (12 mi)
- Width: 6 km (3.7 mi)
- Area: 130 km^{2} (50 mi^{2})

Geography
- Country: Canada
- Province: British Columbia
- District: Range 2 Coast Land District
- Parent range: Waddington Range
- Topo map: NTS 92N6 Mount Waddington

Geology
- Rock age: Miocene-to-Pleistocene
- Mountain type: Eroded volcano
- Volcanic arc: Canadian Cascade Arc
- Volcanic belt: Pemberton/Garibaldi Belt

The Franklin Glacier Complex is a deeply eroded volcano in the Waddington Range of southwestern British Columbia, Canada. Located about 65 km (40 mi) northeast of Kingcome, this little-known complex is adjacent to Franklin Glacier near Mount Waddington. It is over 2,000 m (6,600 ft) in elevation and due to its considerable overall altitude, a large proportion of the complex is covered by glacial ice.

Magmatic activity of the Franklin Glacier Complex spanned roughly four million years from the Late Miocene to the Early Pleistocene, with the most recently identified volcanic eruption having taken place around 2.2 million years ago. The existence of thermal springs near the complex implies that magmatic heat is still present. It has therefore been of interest to geothermal exploration.

== Geography ==
The area lies in one of British Columbia's many territorial divisions called the Range 2 Coast Land District. Local relief exceeds 2,000 m (6,600 ft) with the 18 km (11 mi) long valley-filling Franklin Glacier originating from an icefield below the west face of Mount Waddington. It is part of the Waddington Range, a subrange of the Pacific Ranges which in turn are a subdivision of the Coast Mountains.

The Franklin Glacier Complex was covered by the Cordilleran Ice Sheet until its retreat about 13,000 years ago. Franklin Glacier has since undergone glacial retreat and expansion throughout the Holocene. It appears to have retreated significantly during the early Holocene warm period, followed by advancements 6,300, 5,400, 4,600, 4,100, 3,100, 2,400, 1,500, 800 and 600 years ago. The timing of expansions corresponded with cool summer temperatures, generally moist conditions and increased precipitation.

== Geology ==
Minimal geologic studies have been conducted at the Franklin Glacier Complex and its geology is therefore poorly known. It measures 6 km (3.7 mi) wide and 20 km (12 mi) long, covering a northwesterly elliptical area of 130 km^{2} (50 mi^{2}). Volcanic rocks of the Franklin Glacier Complex consist predominantly of dacite breccia, minor dacite flows and a few hornblende andesite remnants. An absence of pumice, glassy blocks or bombs in the breccia suggests that it may be of epiclastic origin, possibly formed during collapse and infilling of a caldera. The complex has therefore been described as a caldera or a cauldron subsidence. Heavy erosion of the volcanic rocks has exposed a series of biotite-quartz-porphyry, biotite quartz-feldspar-porphyry and quartz monzonite subvolcanic plutons and dike swarms. They intrude through fractured and hydrothermally altered Mesozoic to early Tertiary granitic and metamorphic rocks of the Coast Plutonic Complex.

The complex lies on the overlapping trend of the Garibaldi and Pemberton volcanic belts, which were formed as a result of subduction zone magmatism along the Cascade Volcanic Arc in the last 29 million years. Two separate stages of magmatic activity have been identified at the Franklin Glacier Complex. The first magmatic stage about 6.8 million years ago involved the central emplacement of an elongated quartz monzonite stock. At least five porphyry and transitional vein-type mineral occurrences were deposited during this period. A series of smaller intrusions were emplaced during the second magmatic stage 2.2 to 3.9 million years ago, at least some of which appear to have been feeders for the overlying volcanic pile. The Franklin Glacier Complex is substantially older than the neighbouring Silverthrone Caldera to the northwest.

Immediately west of the Franklin Glacier Complex are a series of hot springs confined in valleys. At Canyon Lake, a hot spring feeds a small stream that flows into the southeastern end of that lake. A single temperature of 58 °C (136 °F) has been obtained from this spring while the Hoodoo Creek and Pinter spring temperatures remain unknown. The existence of these hot springs has made the Franklin Glacier Complex a target for geothermal exploration but little work has been conducted due to its remote location. The only performed exploration has been moderate geological mapping. A 50 megawatt binary plant has been proposed at Canyon Lake.

== History ==
Mineral exploration at the Franklin Glacier Complex has occurred sporadically since at least the 1960s. The earliest recorded work was done by Kennco Exploration Limited with the staking of claims in a zone of copper-molybdenum mineralization associated with the quartz monzonite stock. This was followed by geological mapping, silt and soil geochemical sampling and 192 m (630 ft) of diamond drilling in seven short boreholes. Kennco conducted no further work which led to the eventual lapse of their mineral claims in 1976. The area was restaked later that year by United Mineral Services Limited who would conduct reconnaissance mapping and regional research. In 1987–1988, United Pacific Gold Limited performed trenching, mapping, geophysics, geochemical sampling and 785 m (2,575 ft) of diamond drilling in nine boreholes. Mineral claims were staked once again in 1996 by F. Onucki and J. R. Deighton for the purpose of locating reported high-grade silver mineralization.

Franklin Glacier was skied by Canadian mountaineers Don and Phyllis Munday on July 22, 1930 while exploring and mapping glaciers of the Waddington Range. Don Munday named the glacier in 1927 for its association with the Franklin River which in turn was named after a Benjamin Franklin at Tatla Lake.

== See also ==
- List of volcanoes in Canada
- List of Cascade volcanoes
