= Mount Grant (British Columbia) =

Mountain in British Columbia, Canada

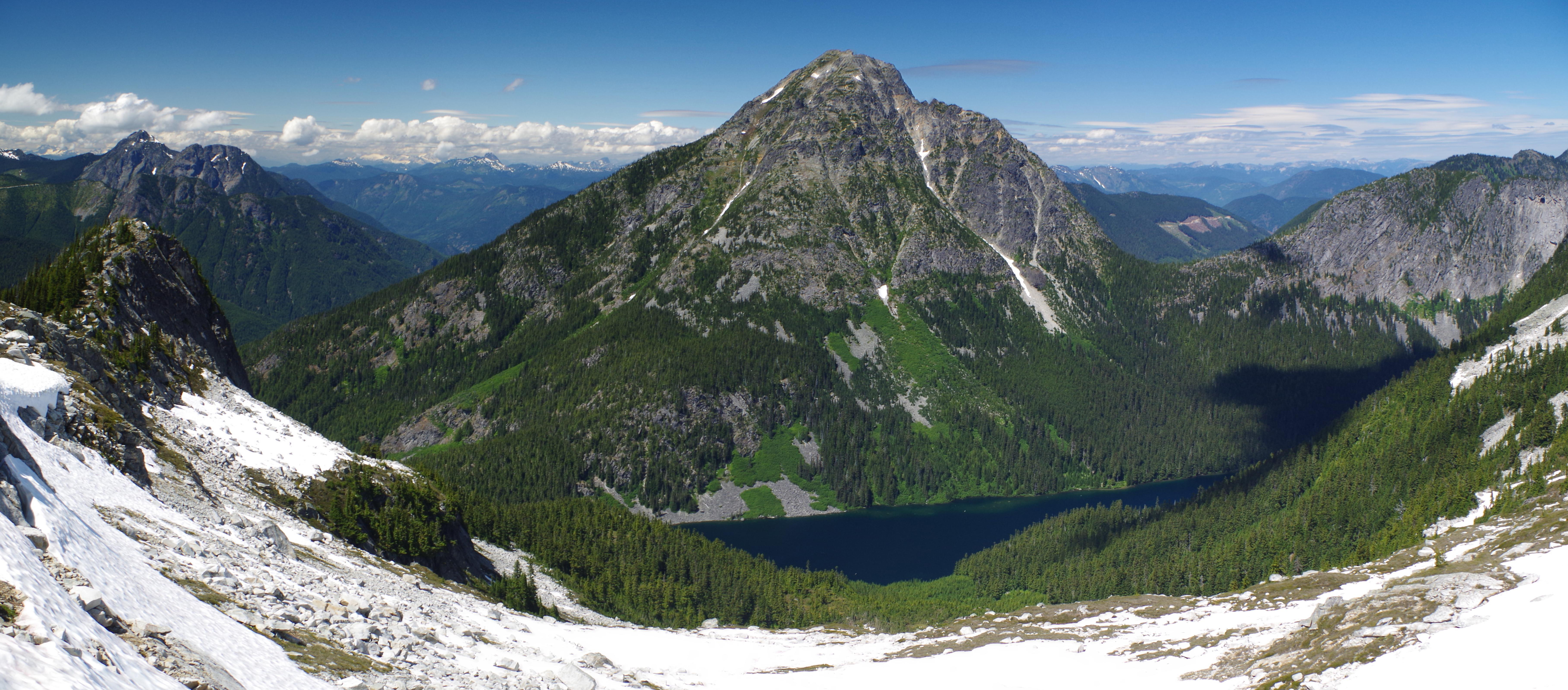
- South aspect of Mount Grant above Eaton Lake as seen from slopes of Eaton Peak

Highest point
- Elevation: 2,180 m (7,150 ft)
- Prominence: 590 m (1,940 ft)
- Parent peak: Silvertip Mountain
- Listing: Mountains of British Columbia
- Coordinates: 49°15′47″N 121°21′27″W

Geography
- Location within British Columbia Location within Canada
- Interactive map of Mount Grant
- Location: British Columbia, Canada
- Parent range: Skagit Range; Canadian Cascades
- Topo map: NTS 92H6 Hope

Geology
- Mountain type: Intrusive
- Rock type: granitic

Climbing
- First ascent: 1951
- Easiest route: Scrambling

Mount Grant is a 2,180-metre (7,150-foot) mountain summit located in the Canadian Cascades of southwestern British Columbia, Canada. It is situated 12 km (7 mi) southeast of Hope, and 15 km (9 mi) northwest of Silvertip Mountain. The peak was first climbed June 15, 1951, by Paul Binkert, John Booth, Dick Chambers, Jim Irving, Don Montgomery, and Jim Teevan. The peak was named for Captain John M. Grant of the Royal Engineers by Fred Beckey in his Cascade Alpine Guide. Precipitation runoff from the peak drains into tributaries of the Fraser River.

== Geology ==
Mount Grant is related to the Chilliwack batholith, which intruded the region 26 to 29 million years ago after the major orogenic episodes in the region. This is part of the Pemberton Volcanic Belt, an eroded volcanic belt that formed as a result of the subduction of the Farallon Plate starting 29 million years ago.

During the Pleistocene period dating back over two million years ago, glaciation advancing and retreating repeatedly scoured the landscape leaving deposits of rock debris. The U-shaped cross section of the river valleys is a result of recent glaciation. Uplift and faulting in combination with glaciation have been the dominant processes which have created the tall peaks and deep valleys of the North Cascades area.

The North Cascades features some of the most rugged topography in the Cascade Range with craggy peaks and ridges, deep glacial valleys, and granite spires. Geological events occurring many years ago created the diverse topography and drastic elevation changes over the Cascade Range leading to various climate differences which lead to vegetation variety defining the ecoregions in this area.

== Climate ==
Based on the Köppen climate classification, Mount Grant is located in the marine west coast climate zone of western North America. Most weather fronts originate in the Pacific Ocean, and travel east toward the Cascade Range where they are forced upward by the range (Orographic lift), causing them to drop their moisture in the form of rain or snowfall. As a result, the Cascade Mountains experience high precipitation, especially during the winter months in the form of snowfall. Temperatures can drop below −20 °C with wind chill factors below −30 °C. The months of July through September offer the most favorable weather for climbing Mount Grant.

== See also ==
- Geography of the North Cascades
