= Crossover Peak =

Mountain in the country of Canada

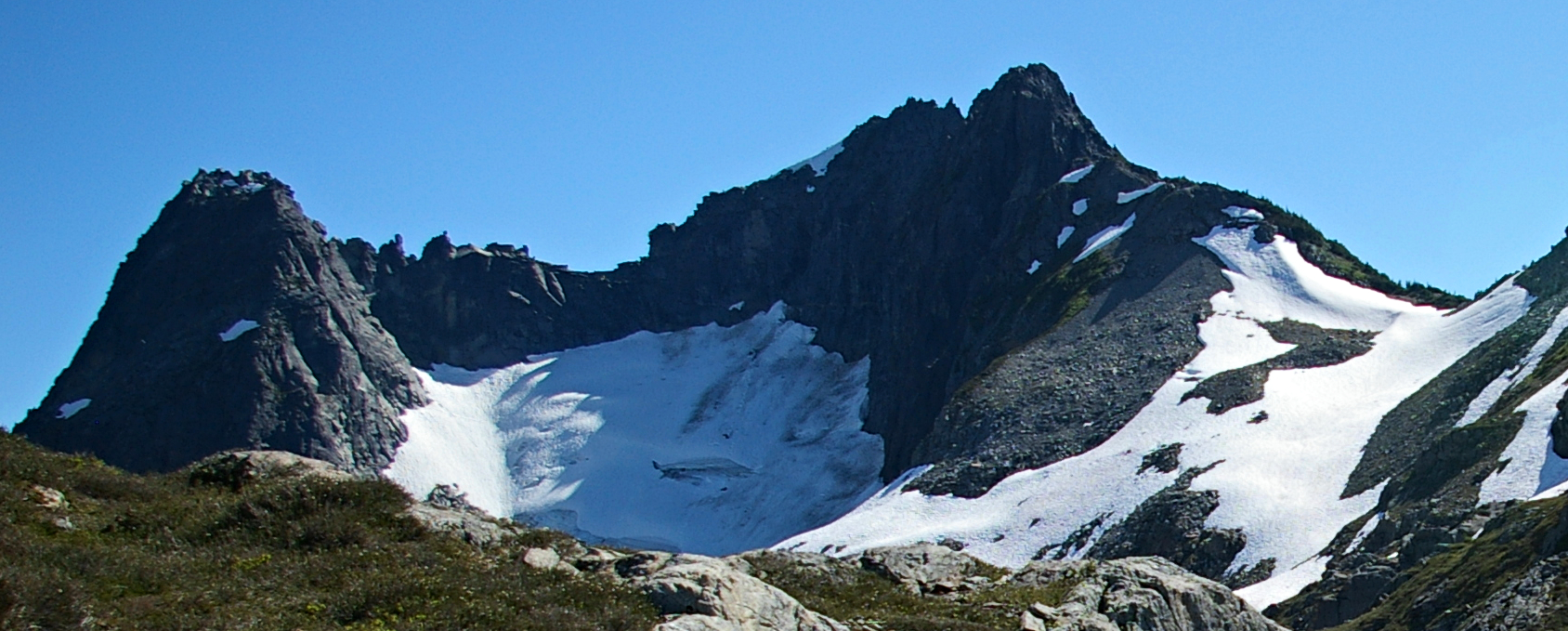
- Crossover Peak, northeast aspect

Highest point
- Elevation: 2,175 m (7,136 ft)
- Prominence: 185 m (607 ft)
- Parent peak: Slesse Mountain
- Listing: Mountains of British Columbia
- Coordinates: 49°02′38″N 121°36′22″W

Geography
- Location within British Columbia Location within Canada
- Interactive map of Crossover Peak
- Location: British Columbia, Canada
- District: Yale Division Yale Land District
- Parent range: Skagit Range; North Cascades
- Topo map: NTS 92H4 Chilliwack

Geology
- Mountain type: Intrusive
- Volcanic belt: Pemberton Volcanic Belt

Climbing
- Easiest route: Scramble class 4

Crossover Peak is a 2,175-metre (7,136-foot) mountain summit located in the Cascade Mountains of southwestern British Columbia, Canada. It is situated 4.5 km (3 mi) north of the Canada–United States border, 1.6 km (1 mi) southeast of Mount MacFarlane, and 2 km (1 mi) north-northwest of Slesse Mountain, which is its nearest higher peak. Precipitation runoff from the peak drains into Slesse Creek and Nesakwatch Creek, both tributaries of the Chilliwack River. The mountain's name was submitted by Glenn Woodsworth of the Alpine Club of Canada based on the popular cross-over hike from the Pierce Lake trail to the Slesse trail on opposite sides of the peak. The name was officially adopted on May 21, 1981, by the Geographical Names Board of Canada.

== Geology ==
Crossover Peak is related to the Chilliwack batholith, which intruded the region 26 to 29 million years ago after the major orogenic episodes in the region. This is part of the Pemberton Volcanic Belt, an eroded volcanic belt that formed as a result of subduction of the Farallon Plate starting 29 million years ago.

During the Pleistocene period dating back over two million years ago, glaciation advancing and retreating repeatedly scoured the landscape leaving deposits of rock debris. The U-shaped cross section of the river valleys is a result of recent glaciation. Uplift and faulting in combination with glaciation have been the dominant processes which have created the tall peaks and deep valleys of the North Cascades area.

The North Cascades features some of the most rugged topography in the Cascade Range with craggy peaks and ridges, deep glacial valleys, and granite spires. Geological events occurring many years ago created the diverse topography and drastic elevation changes over the Cascade Range leading to various climate differences which lead to vegetation variety defining the ecoregions in this area.

== Climate ==
Based on the Köppen climate classification, Crossover Peak is located in the marine west coast climate zone of western North America. Most weather fronts originate in the Pacific Ocean, and travel east toward the Cascade Range where they are forced upward by the range (Orographic lift), causing them to drop their moisture in the form of rain or snowfall. As a result, the Cascade Mountains experience high precipitation, especially during the winter months in the form of snowfall. Temperatures can drop below −20 °C with wind chill factors below −30 °C. The months July through September offer the most favorable weather for climbing Crossover Peak.

== Gallery ==
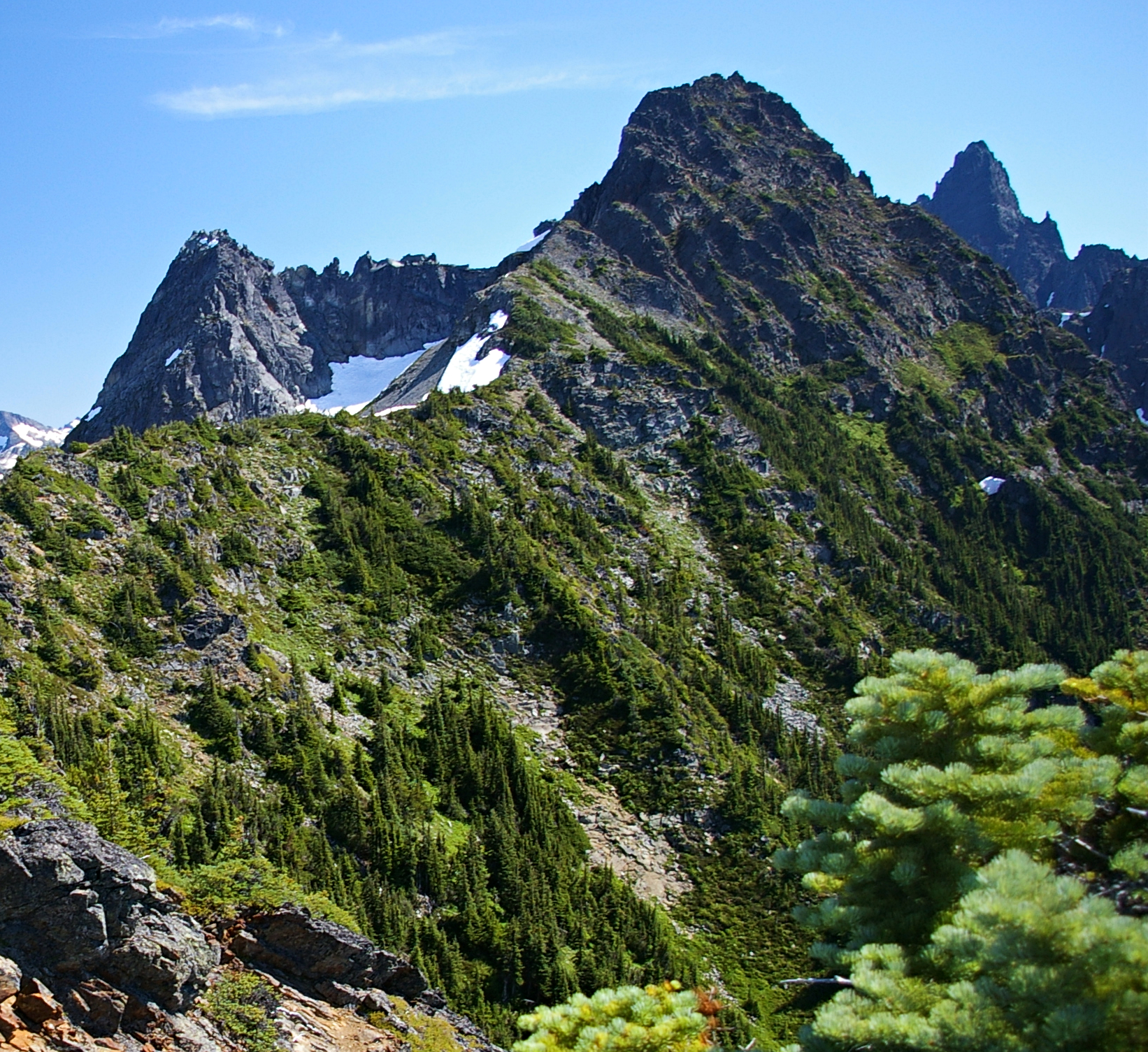
Crossover Peak, northwest aspect

== See also ==
- Geography of the North Cascades
- Geology of British Columbia
