= Mount Grant =

Mount Grant can refer to

== Canada ==
- Mount Grant (British Columbia)

== South Georgia ==
- Mount Grant, South Georgia

== United States ==
- Mount Grant (Montana)
- Mount Grant (Nevada), Mineral County
- Mount Augusta (Nevada), also known as Mount Grant; in Churchill County
- Mount Grant (Vermont)
