= Daisy Lake (British Columbia) =

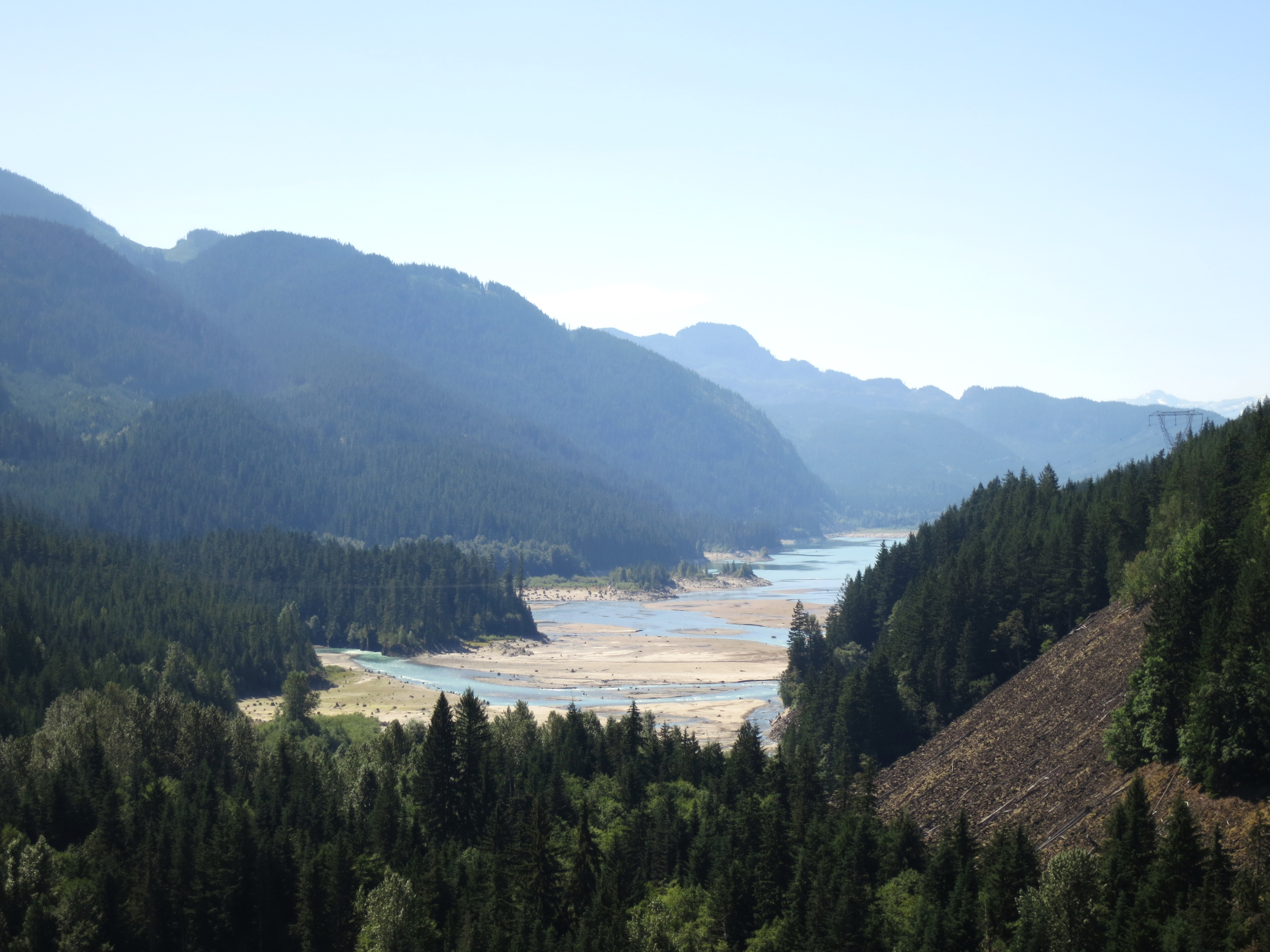
- Daisy Lake viewed from Brandywine Falls

- Location within British Columbia
- Location: British Columbia
- Coordinates: 50°00′N 123°07′W
- Type: reservoir
- Primary inflows: Cheakamus River
- Primary outflows: Cheakamus River
- Basin countries: Canada

Daisy Lake, also referred to as Daisy Lake Reservoir, is a reservoir on the Cheakamus River in the Sea to Sky Corridor of southwestern British Columbia, Canada, just south of the Resort Municipality of Whistler and immediately north of the abandoned townsite of Garibaldi (which until 1932 had been also named Daisy Lake).

The Daisy Lake Dam was built in 1926 and rebuilt in 1984 with the reservoir created merging the former natural Daisy Lake and another named Shadow Lake. The reservoir supplies the 158MW Cheakamus Generating Station on the Squamish River 49°56′4″N 123°17′21″W via an 11 km tunnel bored beneath the mountain range dividing the two rivers.

There is a BC Hydro-operated recreation area just above the dam, and public campgrounds and picnic tables at Brandywine Falls Provincial Park, which is near the head of the lake. The upper reaches of the lake are visible from viewing platform on the north side of the falls and also from points along the hiking trails lining the cliff edge above the Cheakamus River north and south of the falls.

The northern, western and southwestern sides of Daisy Lake are influenced by lava flows composing the Cheakamus Valley basalts.

== Climate ==
Climate data for Daisy Lake
Month	Jan	Feb	Mar	Apr	May	Jun	Jul	Aug	Sep	Oct	Nov	Dec	Year
Record high °C (°F)	10.0 (50.0)	13.3 (55.9)	17.5 (63.5)	29.4 (84.9)	31.7 (89.1)	34.4 (93.9)	36.7 (98.1)	35.6 (96.1)	32.2 (90.0)	25.6 (78.1)	15.6 (60.1)	11.5 (52.7)	36.7 (98.1)
Mean daily maximum °C (°F)	0.9 (33.6)	4.3 (39.7)	6.0 (42.8)	10.9 (51.6)	16.1 (61.0)	18.8 (65.8)	22.6 (72.7)	21.7 (71.1)	19.0 (66.2)	11.8 (53.2)	5.6 (42.1)	2.2 (36.0)	11.7 (53.0)
Daily mean °C (°F)	−2.8 (27.0)	0.0 (32.0)	1.2 (34.2)	5.4 (41.7)	9.4 (48.9)	12.7 (54.9)	15.3 (59.5)	15.0 (59.0)	12.3 (54.1)	7.3 (45.1)	2.3 (36.1)	−0.8 (30.6)	6.4 (43.6)
Mean daily minimum °C (°F)	−8.4 (16.9)	−4.3 (24.3)	−3.6 (25.5)	−0.2 (31.6)	2.6 (36.7)	6.5 (43.7)	7.9 (46.2)	8.3 (46.9)	5.6 (42.1)	2.6 (36.7)	−1.1 (30.0)	−3.8 (25.2)	1.0 (33.8)
Record low °C (°F)	−26.1 (−15.0)	−18.3 (−0.9)	−17.8 (0.0)	−7.8 (18.0)	−3.0 (26.6)	−0.6 (30.9)	0.6 (33.1)	2.2 (36.0)	−3.9 (25.0)	−15.0 (5.0)	−13.9 (7.0)	−25.0 (−13.0)	−26.1 (−15.0)
Average precipitation mm (inches)	296.5 (11.67)	224.9 (8.85)	206.5 (8.13)	118.4 (4.66)	61.6 (2.43)	71.8 (2.83)	42.7 (1.68)	46.8 (1.84)	110.9 (4.37)	258.0 (10.16)	275.4 (10.84)	340.7 (13.41)	2,054.2 (80.87)
Average snowfall cm (inches)	130.6 (51.4)	70.5 (27.8)	37.3 (14.7)	8.5 (3.3)	0.5 (0.2)	0.0 (0.0)	0.0 (0.0)	0.0 (0.0)	0.0 (0.0)	3.7 (1.5)	30.7 (12.1)	101.2 (39.8)	383 (150.8)
Average precipitation days	18	16	18	14	12	14	9	11	12	19	19	19	181
Average snowy days	12	9	7	1	0	0	0	0	0	1	4	10	44
Source: Environment and Climate Change Canada

== See also ==
- List of lakes of British Columbia
