= Mount Barr =

Mountain in British Columbia, Canada

- Location within British Columbia
- Interactive map of Mount Barr

Highest point
- Elevation: 1,907 m (6,257 ft)
- Prominence: 137 m (449 ft)
- Coordinates: 49°15′49″N 121°33′35″W

Geography
- Location: British Columbia, Canada
- District: Yale Division Yale Land District
- Parent range: Skagit Range, Cascade Mountains
- Topo map: NTS 92H5 Harrison Lake

Geology
- Rock type: Intrusive
- Volcanic arc: Canadian Cascade Arc
- Volcanic belt: Pemberton Volcanic Belt

Mount Barr is a mountain in the Skagit Range of the Cascade Mountains of southern British Columbia, Canada, located on the northeast side of Wahleach Lake and just southwest of Hope. It is a ridge highpoint with an elevation of 1,907 m (6,257 ft).

Mount Barr is one of several magmatic features just north of the Chilliwack batholith. It is part of a large circular igneous intrusion that was emplaced along the Fraser Fault 16 to 21 million years ago. The intrusion is part of the Pemberton Volcanic Belt, an eroded volcanic belt that formed as a result of subduction of the Farallon Plate starting 29 million years ago.
