= Franklin Glacier =

Glacier in British Columbia, Canada

- Mount Waddington and Franklin Glacier

- Location within British Columbia
- Interactive map of Franklin Glacier
- Type: Mountain glacier
- Location: British Columbia, Canada
- Coordinates: 51°15′59″N 125°23′5″W

Franklin Glacier is a mountain glacier in the Waddington Range of the Pacific Ranges in southwestern British Columbia, Canada. It lies at the head of the Franklin River adjacent to Mount Waddington, the highest mountain entirely within British Columbia.

The name of the glacier was officially adopted in 1928 after having been submitted by mountaineer Don Munday in August 1927 for its association with the Franklin River. It is the namesake of the Franklin Glacier Complex, a heavily eroded geologic feature consisting of dikes, subvolcanic intrusions and overlying volcanic rocks.

A base camp was established on the Franklin Glacier on June 23, 1934, by climbers Neal Carter, Alan Lambert, Alec Dalgleish and Eric Brooks as part of an attempted first ascent of Mount Waddington. Their ascent abruptly ended three days later when Dalgleish fell to his death from Waddington's southeast ridge.
