= Crevasse Crag =

Mountain in the country of Canada

- Location within British Columbia
- Interactive map of Crevasse Crag

Highest point
- Elevation: 2,496 m (8,189 ft)
- Prominence: 66 m (217 ft)
- Coordinates: 50°06′40″N 122°11′53″W

Geography
- Location: British Columbia, Canada
- District(s): Kamloops Division Yale Land District; New Westminster Land District
- Parent range: Lillooet Ranges
- Topo map: NTS 92J1 Stein Lake

Geology
- Formed by: Subduction zone volcanism
- Rock age: 16 million years
- Volcanic arc: Canadian Cascade Arc
- Volcanic belt: Pemberton Volcanic Belt

Crevasse Crag is a jagged steep-sided prominence on the summit of a glaciated mountain ridge in the Lillooet Ranges of southwestern British Columbia, Canada. It is located about 49 km (30 mi) southeast of the village of Pemberton. Situated on the boundary between New Westminster Land District and Kamloops Division Yale Land District, the peak has a maximum elevation of 2,496 m (8,189 ft) and a topographic prominence of 66 m (217 ft).

The name of the peak was adopted on March 31, 1969 as submitted by climber Christian Adam. It is named after the large crevasse directly below its north ridge. Prior to its adoption in 1969, Crevasse Crag was climbed by Adam et al. on August 16, 1967.

Crevasse Crag is the remains of an extinct volcano that formed 16 million years ago when the Pemberton Belt was volcanically active. This volcano erupted breccias, tuffs and plagioclase-phyric flows, all of which form the present day edifice of Crevasse Crag. Analyses of major, trace and rare-earth elements suggest that dacite, andesite and basaltic andesite lava flows form the lower flanks of the crag. These overlie Late Cretaceous and younger intrusive rocks that form the glaciated mountain ridge on which Crevasse Crag lies.
