= Chipmunk Mountain =

Volcanic mountain in British Columbia, Canada

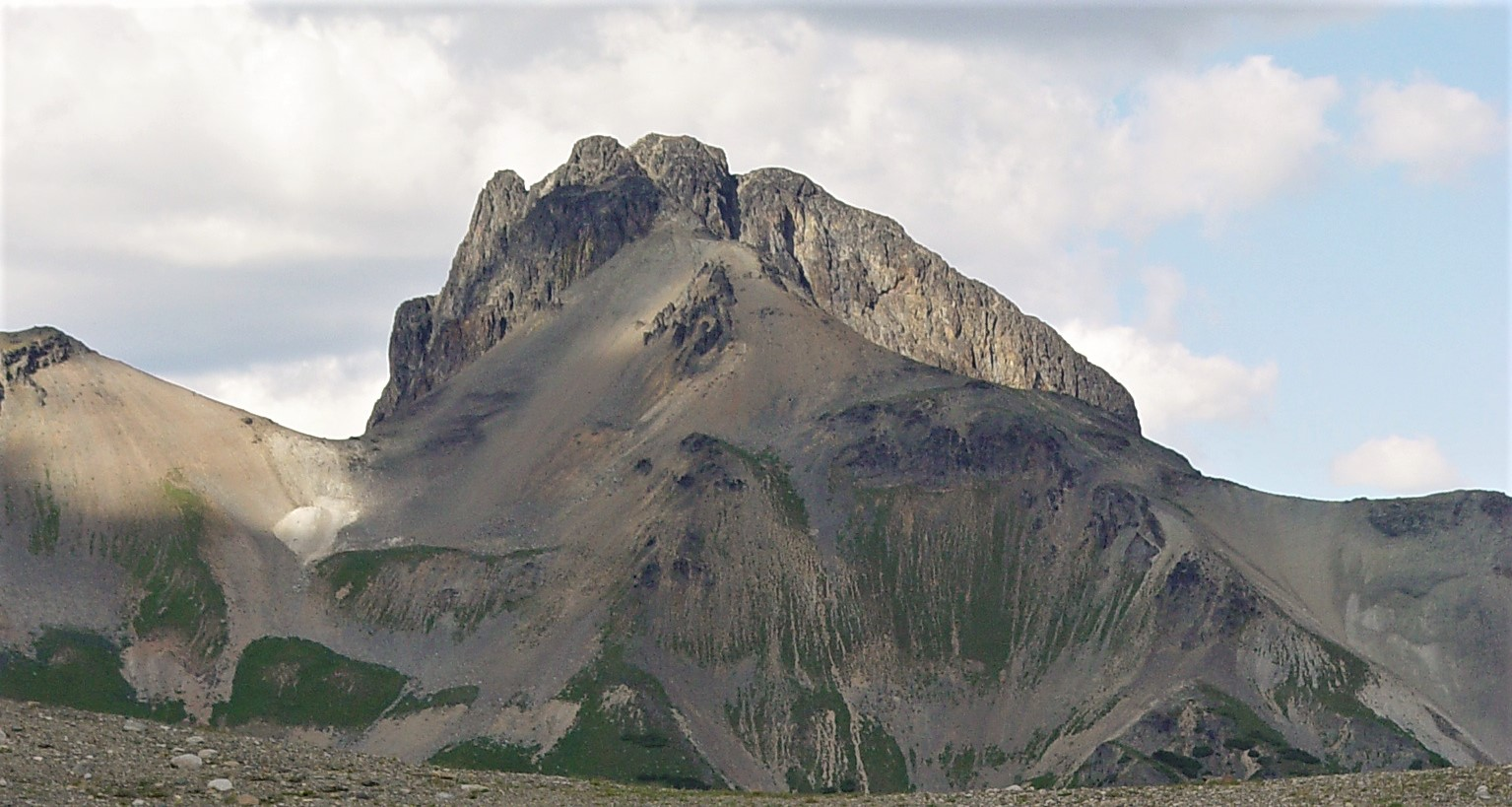
- Summit of Chipmunk Mountain

Highest point
- Elevation: 2,390 m (7,840 ft)
- Prominence: 540 m (1,770 ft)
- Coordinates: 50°34′50″N 122°55′56″W

Geography
- Location within British Columbia
- Interactive map of Chipmunk Mountain
- Location: British Columbia, Canada
- District: Lillooet Land District
- Parent range: Pacific Ranges
- Topo map: NTS 92J10 Birkenhead Lake

Geology
- Rock age: 26.8 ± 1.4 Ma
- Volcanic arc: Canadian Cascade Arc
- Volcanic belt: Pemberton Volcanic Belt
- Last eruption: Miocene age

Chipmunk Mountain is a mountain in southwestern British Columbia, Canada, located 23 km (14 mi) southwest of Bralorne. It has an elevation of 2,390 m (7,840 ft) and a topographic prominence of 540 m (1,770 ft), making it the highest point on an east-trending screed ridge. This horn-like rocky tower is similar to The Black Tusk in Garibaldi Provincial Park.

The mountain was named in 1920 by James Landsborough after a summit party had given lunch scraps to a chipmunk.

== Geology ==
Chipmunk Mountain is the remains of an extinct volcano that formed during the Miocene epoch. The volcanic rocks comprising Chipmunk Mountain crop out in a 12 km^{2} (4.6 mi^{2}) area and consist of pyroclastic rocks, sills and dikes. These volcanic rocks range from basalts to rhyolites, with the majority classifying as basaltic andesites and andesites. They are closely related to the calc-alkaline volcanic centres of the Pemberton Volcanic Belt, indicating the volcanic rocks comprising Chipmunk Mountain were created as a result of volcanism in the Canadian Cascade Arc. The volcanic rocks have been dated to be 26.8 ± 1.4 million years old, which correlates with the time of Pemberton Belt volcanism.

== Gallery ==
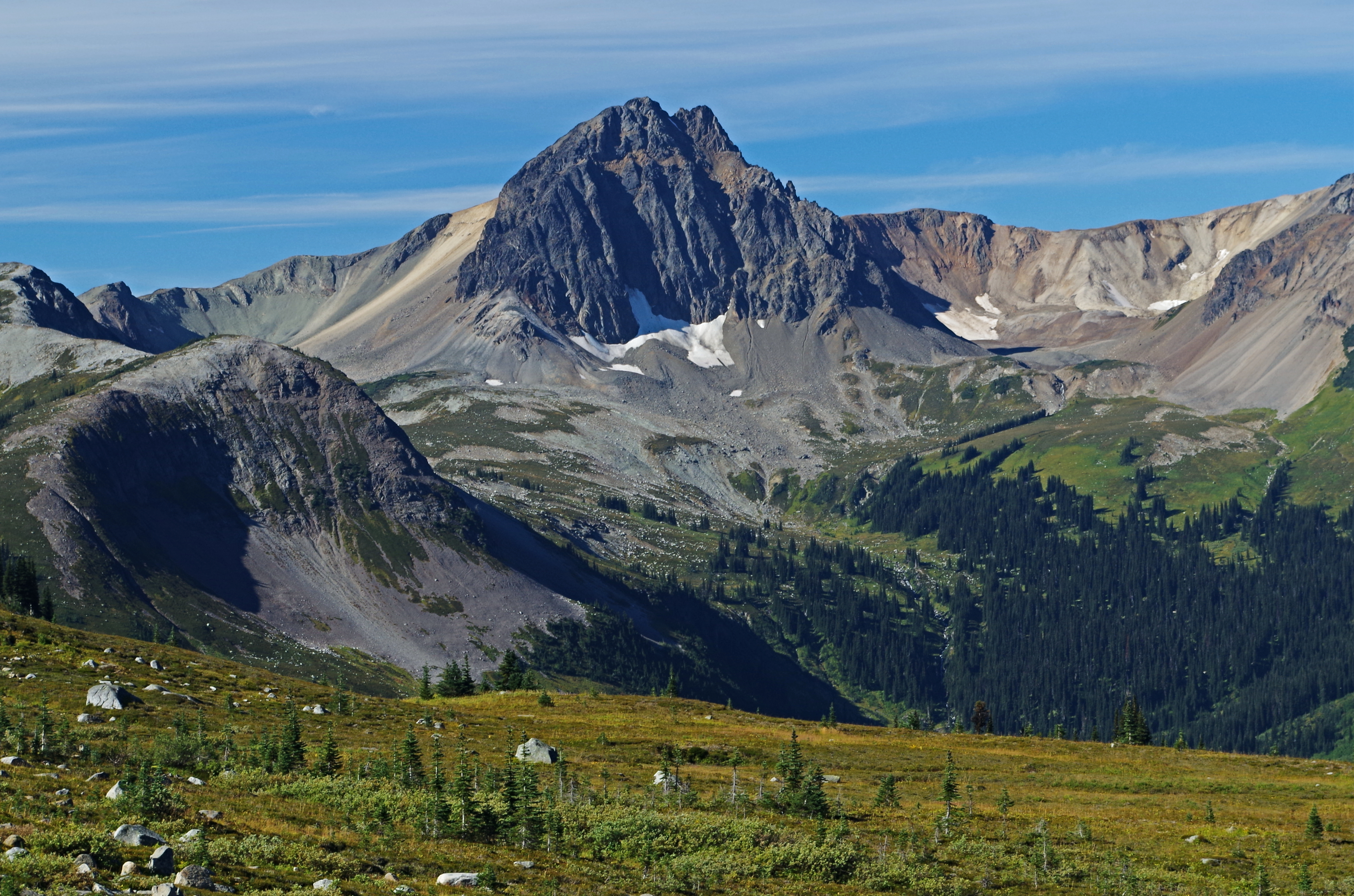
Chipmunk Mountain, northeast aspect

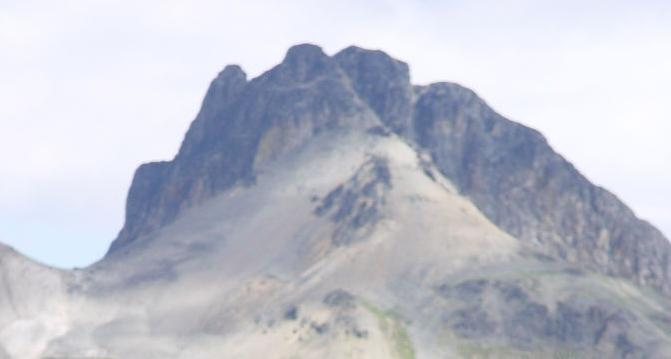
Chipmunk Mountain

== See also ==
- List of volcanoes in Canada
- List of Cascade volcanoes
- Volcanism of Western Canada
