= Silvertip Mountain =

Mountain in the country of Canada

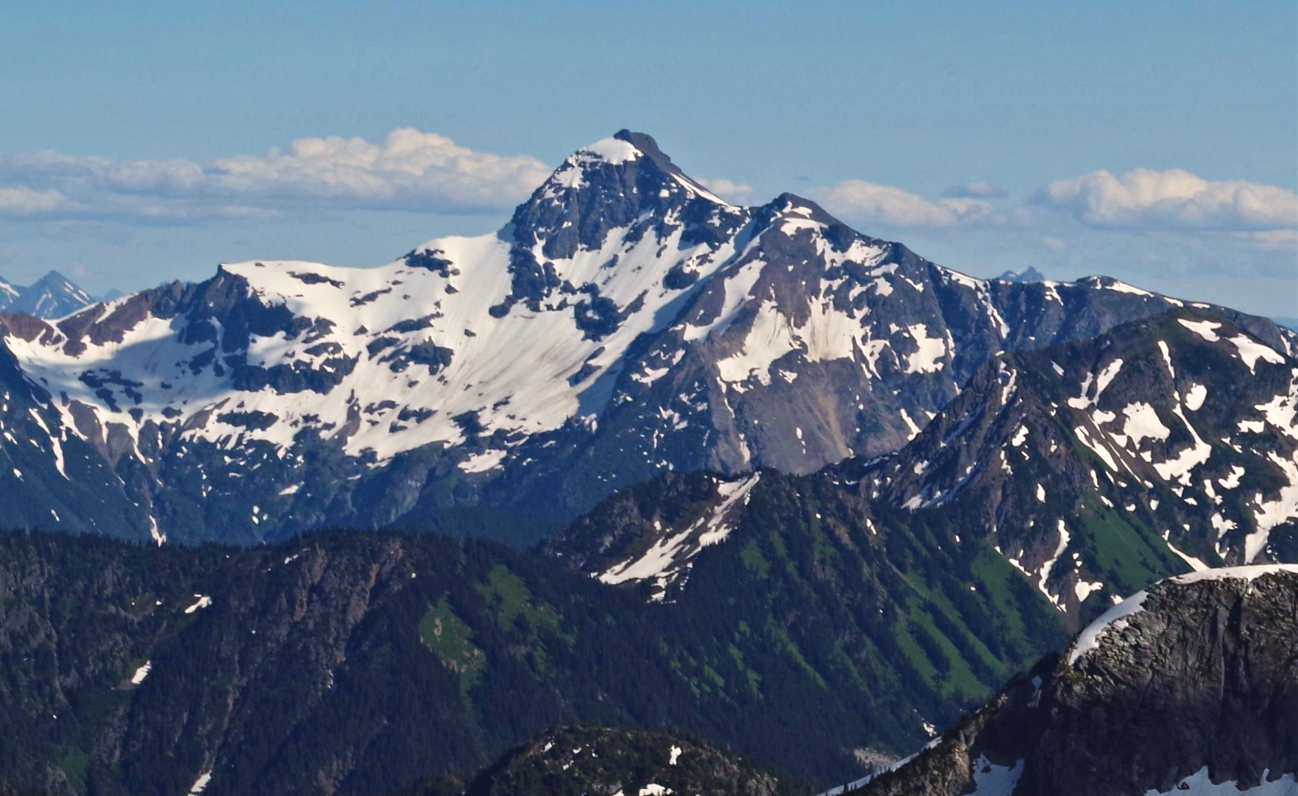

Highest point
- Elevation: 2,596 m (8,517 ft)
- Prominence: 1,871 m (6,138 ft)
- Parent peak: Robinson Mountain
- Listing: Mountains of British Columbia; Canada prominent peaks 50th
- Coordinates: 49°09′47″N 121°12′58″W

Geography
- Location within British Columbia Location within Canada
- Interactive map of Silvertip Mountain
- Country: Canada
- Province: British Columbia
- District: Yale Division Yale Land District
- Parent range: Canadian Cascades
- Topo map: NTS 92H3 Skagit River

Climbing
- First ascent: 1908 Boundary Survey party
- Easiest route: West Ridge

Silvertip Mountain is a 2,596 m (8,517 ft) summit in the Canadian Cascades south of Hope, British Columbia. It lies on the northern boundary of Skagit Valley Provincial Park. With a prominence of 1,871 m (6,138 ft), it is one of the fifty most prominent peaks in Canada. The mountain's toponym was officially adopted on December 2, 1948, by the Geographical Names Board of Canada. The peak was first climbed in 1908 by a Boundary Survey party.

== Geology ==
Silvertip Mountain is related to the Chilliwack batholith, which intruded the region 26 to 29 million years ago after the major orogenic episodes in the region. This is part of the Pemberton Volcanic Belt, an eroded volcanic belt that formed as a result of subduction of the Farallon Plate starting 29 million years ago.

During the Pleistocene period dating back over two million years ago, glaciation advancing and retreating repeatedly scoured the landscape leaving deposits of rock debris. The U-shaped cross section of the river valleys is a result of recent glaciation. Uplift and faulting in combination with glaciation have been the dominant processes which have created the tall peaks and deep valleys of the North Cascades area.

The North Cascades features some of the most rugged topography in the Cascade Range with craggy peaks and ridges, deep glacial valleys, and granite spires. Geological events occurring many years ago created the diverse topography and drastic elevation changes over the Cascade Range leading to various climate differences which lead to vegetation variety defining the ecoregions in this area.

== Climate ==
Based on the Köppen climate classification, Silvertip is located in the marine west coast climate zone of western North America. Most weather fronts originate in the Pacific Ocean, and travel east toward the Cascade Range where they are forced upward by the range (Orographic lift), causing them to drop their moisture in the form of rain or snowfall. As a result, the Cascade Mountains experience high precipitation, especially during the winter months in the form of snowfall. Winter temperatures can drop below −20 °C with wind chill factors below −30 °C. The months July through September offer the most favorable weather for climbing Silvertip.

== Gallery ==
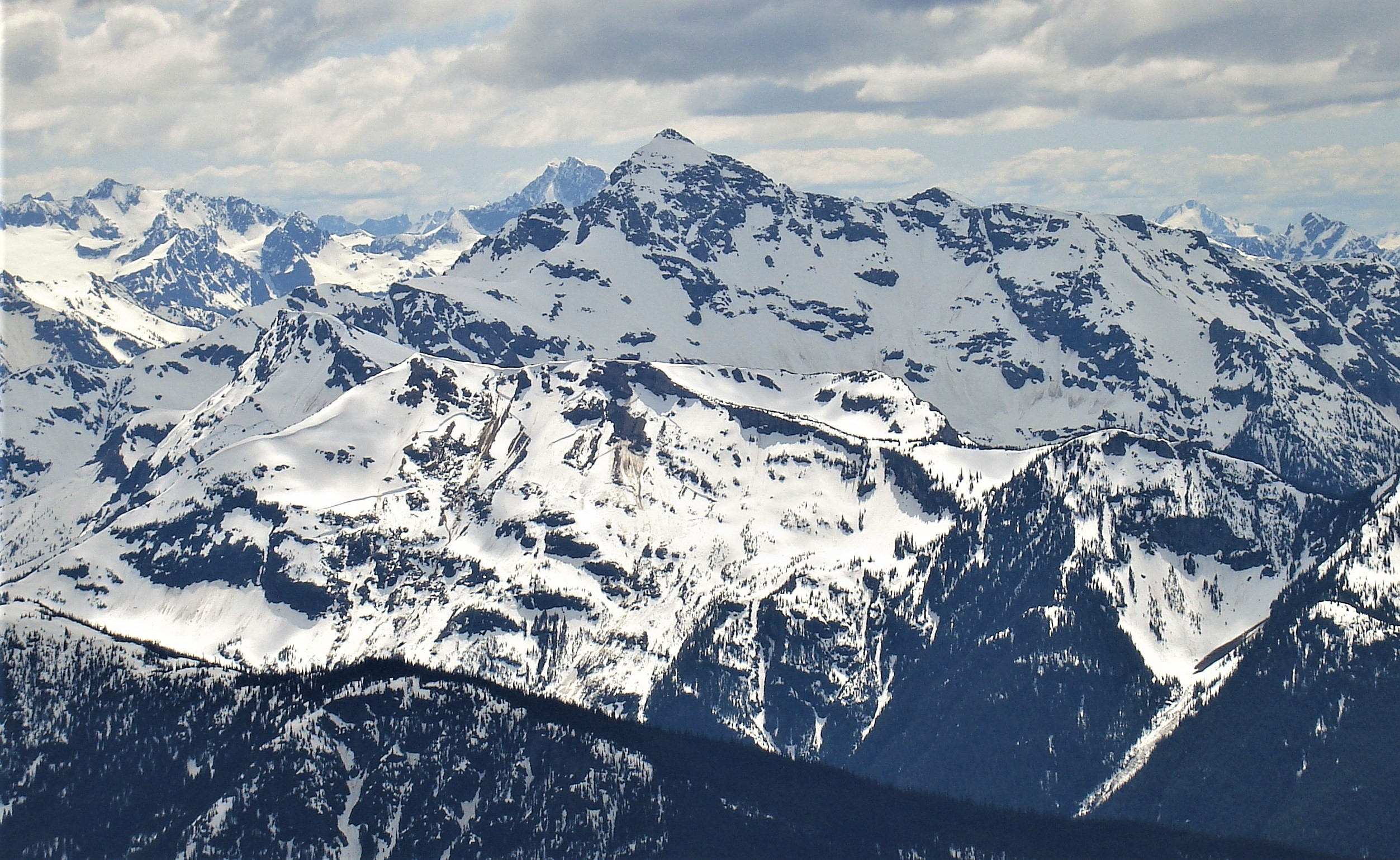
North aspect of Silvertip seen from Mt. Outram

== See also ==
- Geography of the North Cascades
- List of Ultras of North America
