= Mount Barr Plutonic Complex =

Coordinates: 49°15′49″N 121°33′35″W

The Mount Barr Plutonic Complex (MBPC) is a circular body of intrusive rock in the Cascade Mountains of southern British Columbia, Canada. It is located 19 km (12 mi) southwest of the district municipality of Hope, centered around Wahleach Lake. The complex takes its name from Mount Barr, one of many mountains consisting of MBPC intrusive rocks.

Three granitoid intrusions of Miocene age form the MBPC. The largest intrusion consists of rocks ranging from quartz diorite to quartz monzonite and makes up 80% of the complex. Two younger stocks are situated within the main intrusion and consist of quartz monzonite. K–Ar dating of the MBPC has given ages ranging from 21 to 16 million years old.
