= Cupola (geology) =

In geology, a cupola is an upward protrusion from the roof of a large igneous intrusion, such as a batholith. It may also refer to small outlying igneous bodies which may connect at depth with larger igneous masses. Cupola-type magma chambers might form above larger basaltic magma bodies and differentiate to create intermediate or felsic magmas, which in turn may reach the surface to produce small eruptions of intermediate or felsic lava.

== See also ==
- Stock (geology)
