= Masset Formation =

Geologic formation in British Columbia, Canada

- Stratigraphic range: Oligocene–Miocene
- Type: Geological formation

Lithology
- Primary: Calc-alkaline volcanic rocks

Location
- Country: Canada

The Masset Formation is a volcanic formation on Graham Island of Haida Gwaii in British Columbia, Canada. It consists of calc-alkaline volcanic rocks related to subduction of the pre-existing Farallon Plate. The Masset Formation is part of the Pemberton Volcanic Belt.

== See also ==
- Volcanism in Canada
- List of volcanoes in Canada
- Geology of British Columbia
- Geography of British Columbia
