= Salal Creek Pluton =

Coordinates: 50.4526°N 123.2433°W

The Salal Creek Pluton, also called the Salal Creek stock, is a small circular quartz monzonite intrusion with an area of 35 sq mi (91 km^{2}). It is eight million years old, containing 52 dikes composed of basalt and was probably formed 5 mi (8.0 km) or less below the Earth's surface. It forms part of the Pemberton Volcanic Belt, a geological formation that formed as a result of subduction zone magmatism in the Canadian Cascade Arc.

== See also ==
- Volcanism of Western Canada
