= High Falls Creek =

Watercourse in British Columbia, Canada

High Falls Creek is a creek in southwestern British Columbia, Canada, located in the New Westminster Land District. It flows southwest into the larger Squamish River.
