= Cheakamus Valley basalts =

Lava formations in British Columbia

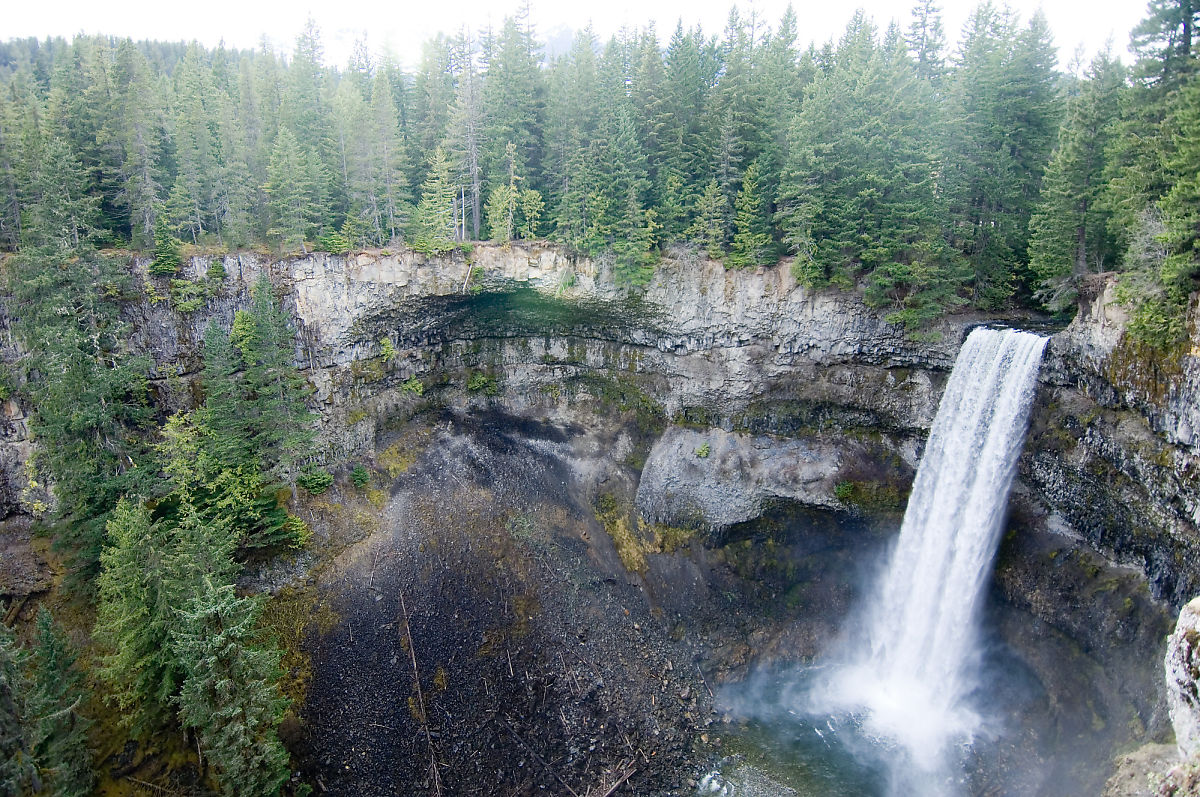
Brandywine Falls in Brandywine Falls Provincial Park. At least three lava flows are clearly visible in the rugged cliffs.

The Cheakamus Valley basalts are a sequence of basaltic lava flows along the Cheakamus River in southwestern British Columbia, Canada. They are part of the Garibaldi section of the Cascade Volcanic Arc and were produced during an episode of volcanic eruptions from an unknown vent. The latest basaltic eruption deposited wood in lacustrine sediments under the lava flows that have been dated 34,200 ± 800 years old. These youngest lavas form isolated ridges above the older glaciated Cheakamus Valley basalts and were described as "esker-like" by Canadian volcanologist Bill Mathews.

Columnar jointing is present all through the most recent basalt lava flow and pillow basalts exist in the lowermost unit, portions of which are underlain by hyaloclastite breccia. Bill Mathews suggested that these esker-like lava flows were deposited during subglacial eruptions that traveled away from the vent inside tunnels or trenches melted in the overlying ice sheet. Mathews based his suggestion on the age of the underlying till, the existence of pillow lava close to the bottom of some lavas that indicate subaqueous volcanism, horizontal jointing at the edges of the lavas that indicate rapid cooling, and the absence of apparent paleotopography to explain these features.

== See also ==
- Volcanism of Western Canada
