= Stock (geology) =

Smaller igneous intrusion

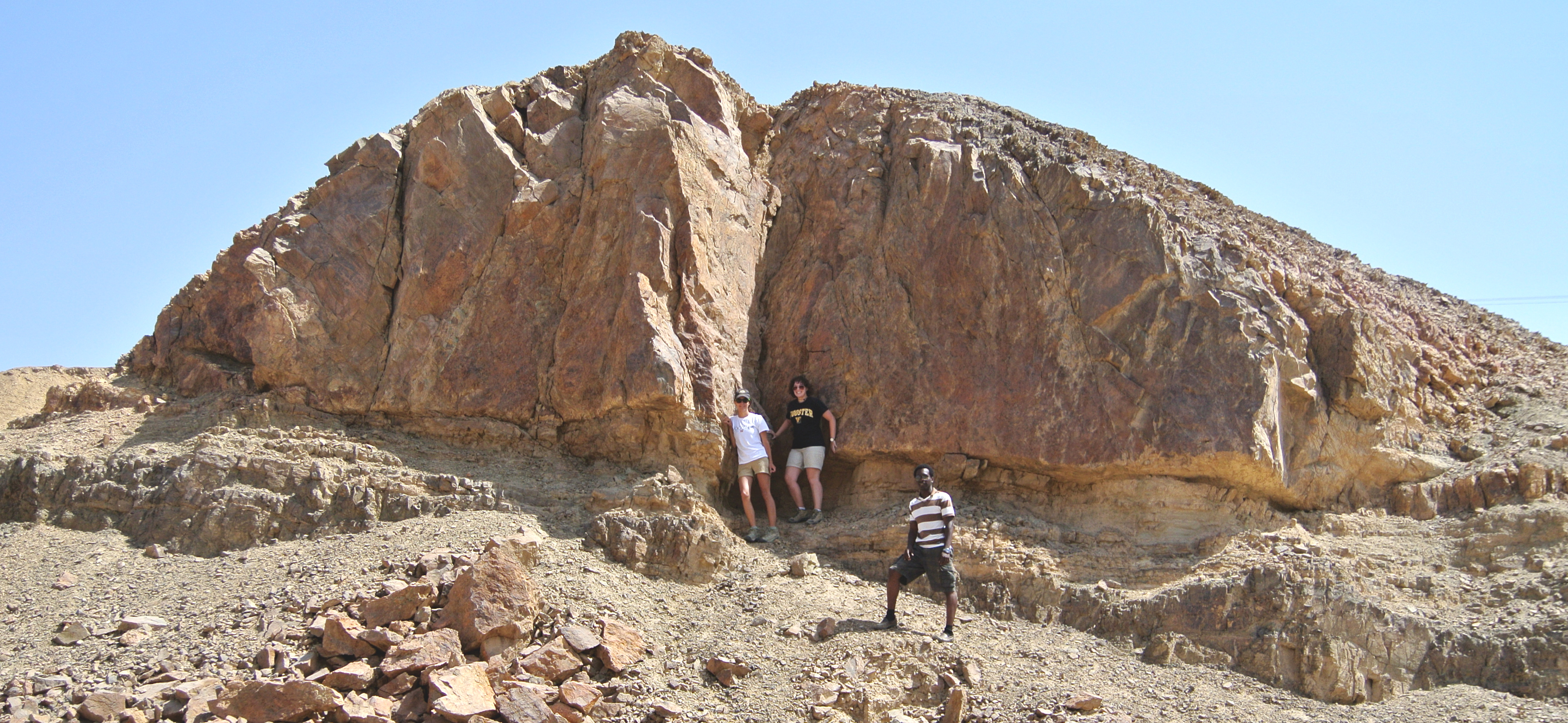
A stock of nordmarkite (quartz-alkali syenite) of Triassic age, in the Gevanim Valley, Makhtesh Ramon, southern Israel.

In geology, a stock is an igneous intrusion that has a surface exposure of less than 100 square kilometres (40 sq mi), differing from batholiths only in being smaller. A stock has a discordant relationship with the rocks that it intrudes. Many stocks are cupolas of hidden batholiths. Some circular or elliptical stocks may be volcanic plugs, which fill the vents of now extinct volcanoes. A boss is a small stock.

== Examples ==
- the Alta and Clayton Peak stocks (composed of granodiorite), near Park City, Utah
- the Hellroaring Creek and Salal Creek stocks (of granite-granodiorite and quartz monzonite, respectively) in British Columbia, Canada
- the Céret stock (of gabbro and diorite) in Pyrénées-Orientales, France
- the Parashi stock (of tonalite) in La Guajira Department, Colombia
- stocks of syenite in the Caldera de Tejeda on Gran Canaria
- Ailsa Craig granitic boss, which forms a volcanic plug, in Scotland
