= Volcanic block =

Rock mass from solidified lava flows

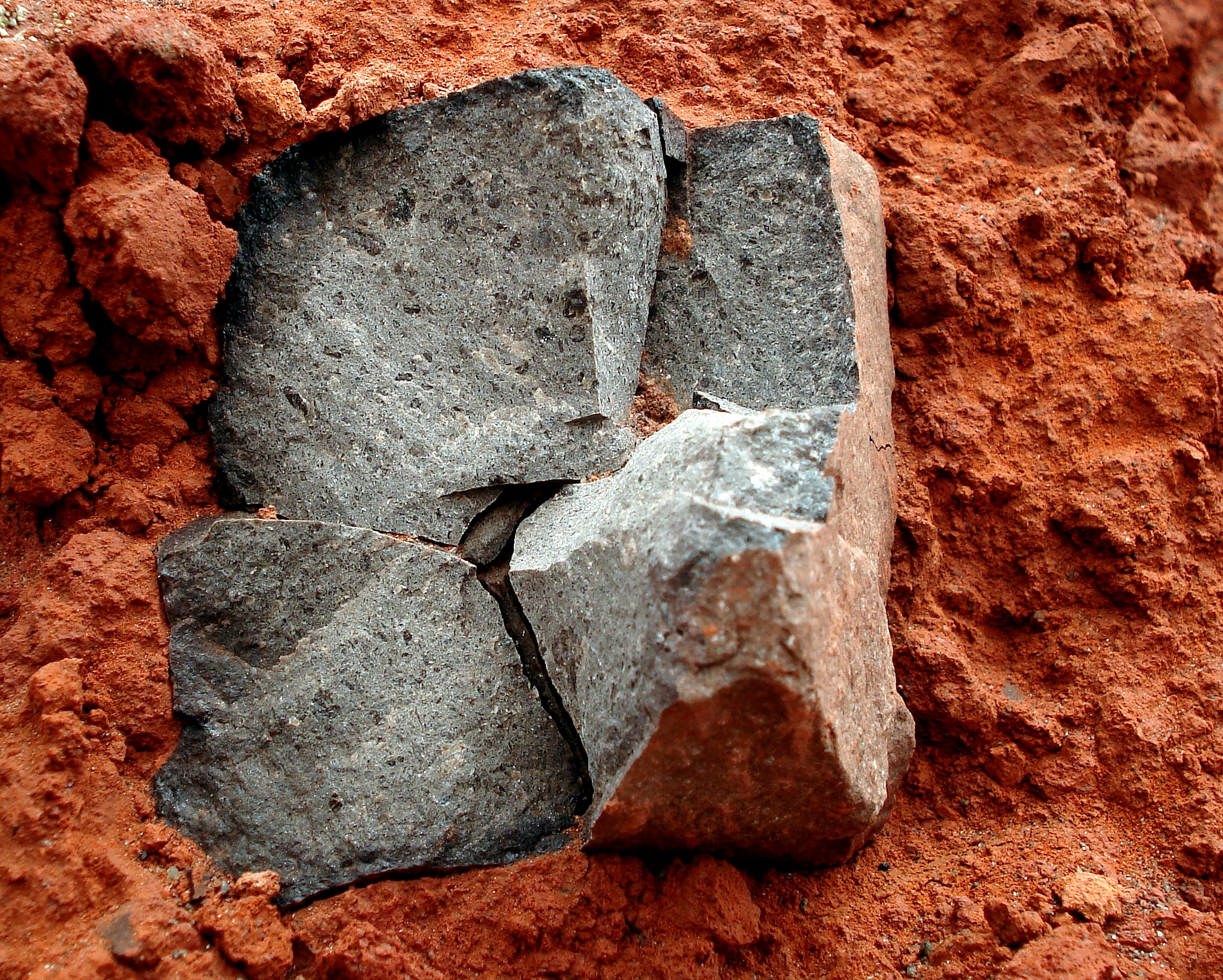
Volcanic block at Cotopaxi volcano, Ecuador

A volcanic block is a fragment of rock that measures more than 64 mm (2.5 in) in diameter and is erupted in a solid condition.

Blocks are formed from material from previous eruptions or from country rock and are therefore mostly accessory or accidental in origin. Blocks also occur due to the impact and breakage of volcanic bombs (a bomb is a block with streamlined appearance, often expelled in a molten state). Blocks can also occur due to the disruption of the crust of a lava dome that has formed up or over a vent during an eruption.

== Features ==
Blocks are nearly always angular to sub-angular and roughly equidimensional. If the parent rock is flow-foliated lava, sedimentary material or schistose metamorphic rocks, the blocks may have a plate-like or slab-like form. In other cases, blocks derived from great depths may resemble polished water-worn pebbles and are cobbled due to fluidisation and upwards transport.

Blocks can be enormous and may be transported great distances from the volcanic vent. The 1924 eruption of Kīlauea, Hawaii, expelled rocks weighing up to 14 tons; and Mount Vesuvius in Italy discharged blocks weighing 2-3 tons over distances of 100-200m.

== See also ==
- Block and ash flow
- Xenolith – Rock inside a rock with a different composition
