= Pemberton Volcanic Belt =

Volcanic belt in British Columbia, Canada

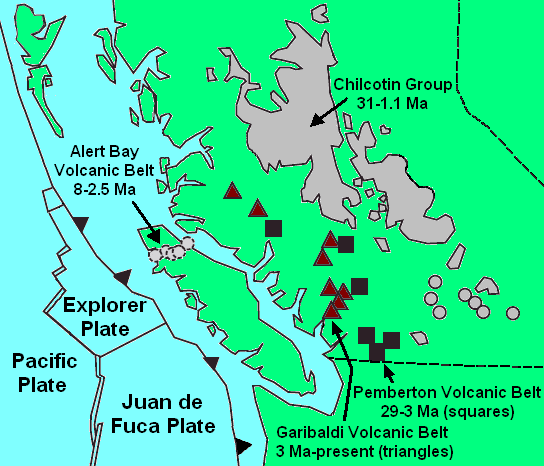
Geological formations related to volcanism in the Canadian Cascade Arc, including the Pemberton Volcanic Belt

The Pemberton Volcanic Belt is an eroded Oligocene–Miocene volcanic belt at a low angle near the Mount Meager massif, British Columbia, Canada. The Garibaldi and Pemberton volcanic belts appear to merge into a single belt, although the Pemberton is older than the Garibaldi Volcanic Belt. The Pemberton Volcanic Belt is one of the geological formations comprising the Canadian Cascade Arc. It formed as a result of subduction of the former Farallon Plate.

== Features ==
Features within the Pemberton Belt include:

- Mount Barr Plutonic Complex
  - Mount Barr
- Chilliwack batholith
  - Slesse Mountain
- Chipmunk Mountain 50°34′49.87″N 122°55′56.47″W
- Coquihalla Mountain 49°31′30.0″N 121°03′36.0″W
- Crevasse Crag
- Franklin Glacier Complex
- Salal Creek Pluton
- Silverthrone Caldera

== See also ==
- Garibaldi Volcanic Belt
- Geology of the Pacific Northwest
- Cascade Volcanoes
- Volcanism of Canada
- Volcanism of Western Canada
