= Chilliwack batholith =

Geologic formation in Canada and the United States

Coordinates: 49°01′N 121°35′W

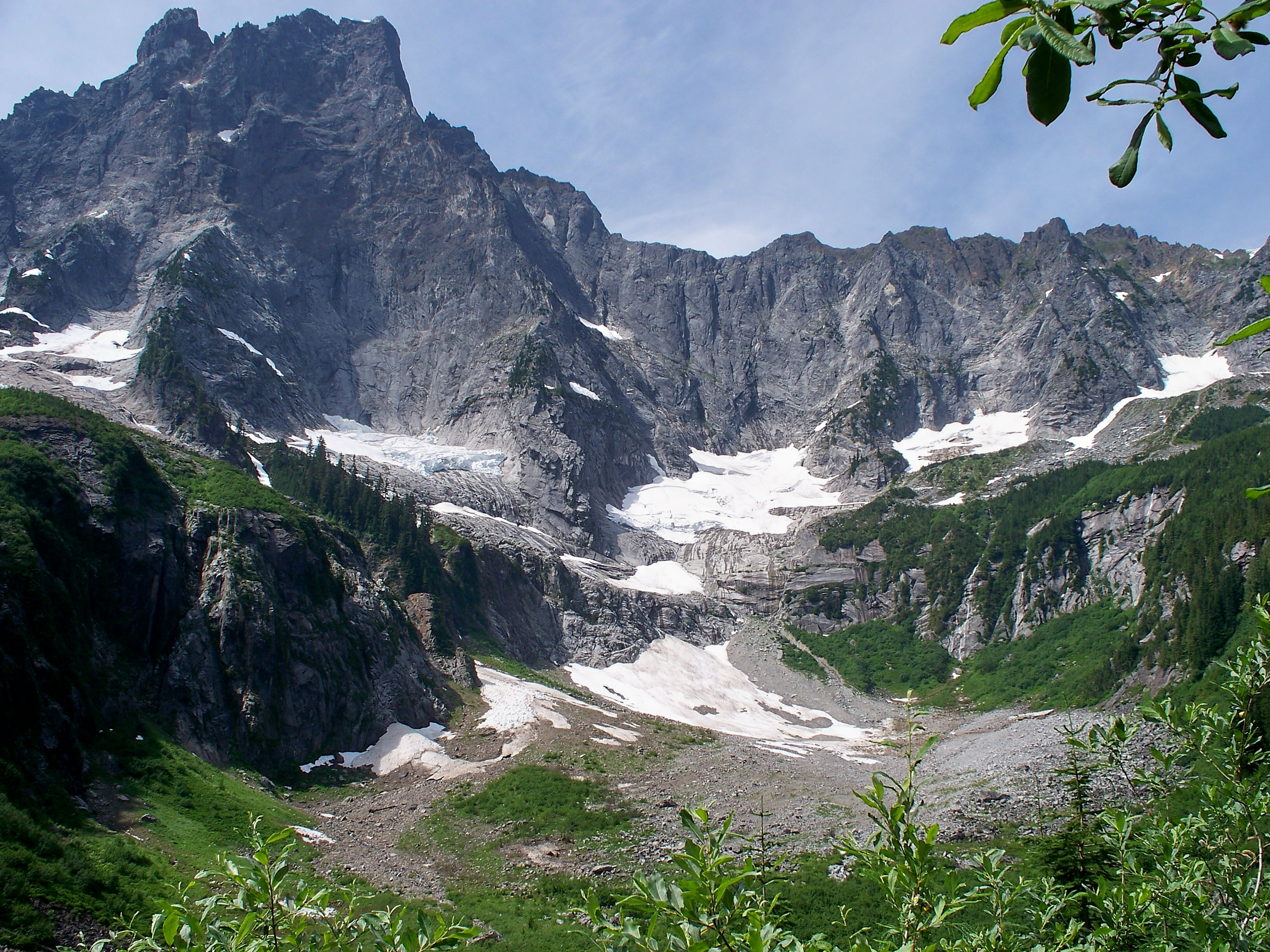
The lowest exposed part of Slesse Mountain in British Columbia, Canada, consists of Chilliwack batholith rocks while the higher parts including the summit are metamorphosed Darrington Phyllite.

The Chilliwack Batholith is a large batholith that forms much of the North Cascades in southwestern British Columbia, Canada and the U.S. state of Washington.

The geological structure is named after the Chilliwack River Valley, where it outcrops in many places. It does not outcrop anywhere near the City of Chilliwack.

The Chilliwack Batholith is part of the Pemberton Volcanic Belt and is the largest mass of exposed intrusive rock in the Cascade Volcanic Arc.

The age of the Chilliwack batholith ranges from 26 to 29 million years old.
