= John Clarke (mountaineer) =

Canadian mountaineer and conservationist

John Clarke, CM (February 25, 1945 – January 23, 2003) was a Canadian explorer, mountaineer, conservationist, and wilderness educator. For much of his adult life, Clarke spent at least six months of each year on extended backcountry trips, usually into the Coast Mountains of British Columbia using the technique of dropping food caches from small planes along an intended route, then traveling that route for weeks at a time. His routes regularly led him along the high ridges and glaciated icefields of the West Coast and allowed him to make hundreds of first ascents of the many mountains along the way. Many of these trips exceeded 30 days in length and were often done solo, simply because nobody could afford the time to accompany him.

== Biography ==
Born in Ireland to Brigit Ann Clarke (née Conway) and Thomas Kevin Clarke, he moved to Canada with his parents at age 11, attending the Monastery School in Mission, British Columbia.

Sometime in 1964, Clarke began his forays into the Coast Mountains, and over the course of the next 39 years made an amazing 600 first ascents.

In 1994, during a multi-week traverse of the Kitlope region of the Coast Mountains, Randy Stoltmann, a good friend of Clarke's, was killed in an avalanche while attempting a summit. This was a turning point for Clarke. Stoltmann, already a noted conservationist and volunteer, had left a hole in the mountain community that Clarke stepped in to fill. He began his wilderness education efforts in memory of him.

In 1995, Clarke was the subject of a documentary called "Child of the Wind" by Canadian director and producer Bill Noble which won the Best film on Climbing at the 1995 Banff Mountain Film Festival.

In 1996, Clarke and Lisa Baile founded the Wilderness Education Program (WEP).

In 1997, Clarke, Chief Bill Williams (hereditary chief of the Squamish First Nation), and artist photographer Nancy Bleck founded the Uts'am Witness Project, providing an opportunity for city folk to reconnect with nature and to take part in a Coast Salish First Nations witness ceremony.

In 1998, because of his work and his knowledge of the Squamish First Nation Territory, Clarke was given the honor of being adopted into the nation and was given the Coast Salish name "Xwexwsélkn" which means "mountain goat" (a reference to his shock of unruly, wooly white hair).

In July 2002, he became one of the few mountaineers in Canada to be inducted as a Member of the Order of Canada. He was also an honorary member of the Alpine Club of Canada and the British Columbia Mountaineering Club.

On January 23, 2003, Clarke died in Vancouver, British Columbia of a brain tumor, with his family at his side. He leaves his wife Annette Clarke (née Lehnacker) and son Nicholas 'Skookum', as well as his parents Brigid and Kevin, his sister Cathaleen and his brother Kevin.

In 2012, Harbour Publishing released the book John Clarke Explorer of the Coast Mountains written by Lisa Baile. In October 2013 a book about the Uts'am Witness Project which Clarke co-founded was published by Figure 1 Publishing. Picturing Transformation Nexw-áyantsut features the photographic artwork of Nancy Bleck and was written Katherine Dodds with Bleck and Chief Bill Williams.

== Climbing accomplishments ==
This is a partial list of first ascents. Many of the peak names are suggested, links are to mountain IDs in the Canadian Mountain Encyclopedia. Where a sub peak is separated by more than 1 km from the main peak (and is unnamed) it is referred to by the main peak name, the compass point and distance from the main peak. For instance, Interesting Mountain has a sub-peak Interesting NE6 which is 6 km from the main summit at bearing 245 degrees.

- 1967 Ossa Mountain West Ridge Picture of summit register
- 1967 Manatee Peak
- 1967 Oluk Peak
- 1967 Dolphin Peak
- 1967 Remora Peak
- 1967 Gunsight Peak (In-SHUCK-ch Mountain)
- 1967 Mermaid Peak
- 1967 Albacore Peak
- 1968 Tenas Peak
- 1968 Tenas W1
- 1968 Nivalis Mountain
- 1968 Pelion Mountain NW Ridge
- 1968 Pelion Mountain NE Ridge
- 1968 Amicus Mountain NE ridge
- 1968 Amicus W1
- 1968 Ring Mountain
- 1969 Lillooet Mountain Southeast Ridge
- 1969 Porterhouse NE3
- 1969 Porterhouse NE4
- 1969 Moomin Peak
- 1969 Tigger Peak
- 1969 Channel Peak
- 1969 Little Ring Mountain
- 1969 Mt. Crerar - John Clarke, Barbara May Handford (Bernhardt) First Ascent
- 1971 Whitemantle Mountain
- 1971 Outlier Peak
- 1971 Nebula Peak
- 1971 Halkomelem Peak
- 1971 Katzie Mountain
- 1971 Stave Peak
- 1971 Old Pierre Mountain
- 1971 The Orphans
- 1971 Nimbus Peak
- 1971 Mount Abel
- 1971 Adieu Mountain
- 1971 Talon Peak
- 1971 The Lecture Cutters
- 1971 Piluk Peak
- 1971 Carcajou Peak
- 1971 Nannygoat Peak
- 1971 Old Pierre Mountain
- 1971 Stalo Mountain
- 1971 Comrade Peaks with large BCMC Party
- 1971 Skakala Peak
- 1971 Skayuk Peak
- 1972 Mount Stanton solo
- 1972 Stanton E5 from E, via Hidden Mtn
- 1972 Abandoned Peak
- 1972 Dunvegan Peak
- 1972 Dunvegan N3
- 1972 Limelite Peak
- 1972 Ashlu Mountain West Ridge
- 1972 Mount Doolittle
- 1972 Doolittle E8
- 1972 Mount Boardman
- 1972 Elaho Mountain via West Ridge
- 1972 Bottiger Peak
- 1972 The Flames (Fire Spires)
- 1972 Deserted Peak
- 1972 Deserted N1
- 1972 Royal Mountain
- 1972 Hanging Peak South Face
- 1972 Wahkash Peak
- 1972 Nebula S1
- 1972 Mount Athelstan Bridge-Lillooet Divide
- 1972 Mount Ethelweard
- 1972 Ethelweard S1
- 1972 Mount Vanstone
- 1972 Mount Perkins
- 1972 Mount Oswald
- 1972 Oswald N2
- 1972 Racoon Mountain
- 1972 Totter Peak
- 1972 Mittelberg Mountain
- 1972 Mittelberg E3
- 1972 Forger Peak
- 1972 Mount Whiting
- 1972 Mount Ralph
- 1972 Pebble Peak
- 1972 Mount Pollock
- 1972 Mount Clendenning
- 1972 Corporal Mountain
- 1972 Guthrum SW3
- 1972 Thiassi SE3
- 1973 Mount Chapman
- 1973 Mount Heaney
- 1973 Kolos Peak during his first visit to the Ha-iltzuk
- 1973 Klisila Peak
- 1973 Shaman Peaks
- 1973 Wahshilas Peak
- 1973 Klinaklini Peak
- 1973 Hamatsa Peak
- 1973 Doran Peak
- 1973 Doran SE3
- 1974 Serov Peak
- 1974 Chimai Mountain
- 1974 Mount Delilah
- 1974 Sessel Mountain
- 1974 Sessel NW1
- 1974 Sessel E4
- 1975 Bucklin Peak
- 1975 Pointer Peak
- 1976 Polacca Peak
- 1976 Apple Peak (Peak 7539. Apple River Spires)
- 1976 Shaker Peak
- 1976 Shaker W6 W Ridge
- 1976 Shaker SW5 N Ridge
- 1976 Stafford Peak East Ridge
- 1976 Hidden Mountain
- 1976 Brig Peak
- 1976 Brig SW4 from N
- 1976 Clipper Peak NW Ridge
- 1976 Success Mountain From the North
- 1976 Success NE4
- 1977 Little Toba Peak
- 1977 Hunaechin Peak
- 1977 Blumlisalp Mountain
- 1977 Beach Mountain
- 1977 Breaker Peak
- 1977 Blackfin Peak
- 1977 Blackfin SE3 (Comber Peak)
- 1979 Sergeant Mountain
- 1982 Charnaud Towers highest summit only
- 1982 Montrose Peak
- 1982 Cobham Peak
- 1983 Mount Willoughby as part of a 29-day solo traverse of the Bella Coola area (Ha-iltzuk Icecap), including 8 days spent snowbound in a tent
- 1983 Mount Storry
- 1984 Orford Tower
- 1984 Berkshire Peak
- 1984 Gravelines Peak
- 1984 Assini Peak
- 1984 Algard Peak
- 1984 Needle Peaks (Stinging Needle)
- 1984 Ironface Peak
- 1984 Nolan Peak
- 1984 Wiltshire Peak
- 1984 Warwick Peak
- 1984 Pillbox Peak
- 1984 Barkshack Peak
- 1984 Champion Mountain
- 1984 Chusan Peak
- 1984 Chusan SW3
- 1984 Chusan SW5
- 1984 Skwawka Peak
- 1984 Brighton NE0
- 1984 Mount Calli
- 1985 Martello Mountain the only first ascent in the Waddington Range
- 1985 Interesting Mountain
- 1985 Interesting N4
- 1985 Interesting NE2
- 1985 Interesting NE6
- 1985 Klite Peak
- 1985 Powell Head Peak
- 1986 Larson Peak
- 1986 Larson SE5
- 1988 Mount Job
- 1989 Rain Door Peak Northeast Ridge
- 1989 Mount Pitt South face of North Peak
- 1989 Mount Caspar First recorded ascent
- 1990 Arabella Peak East Face
- 1990 Mount Argyll
- 1991 The Meager Obelisk
- 1991 Benburb Peak Filer-Montrose Divide
- 1991 Arabella S6 (Argyll E)
- 1991 Snow Pillow Peak
- 1992 The Witness
- 1992 The Defendant Northwest Ridge
- 1995 Stagoo SW12
- 1995 Stagoo W4
- 1995 Stagoo NW4
- 1996 House Mountain 1st recorded ascent
