= Carcajou Peak =

Mountain in British Columbia, Canada

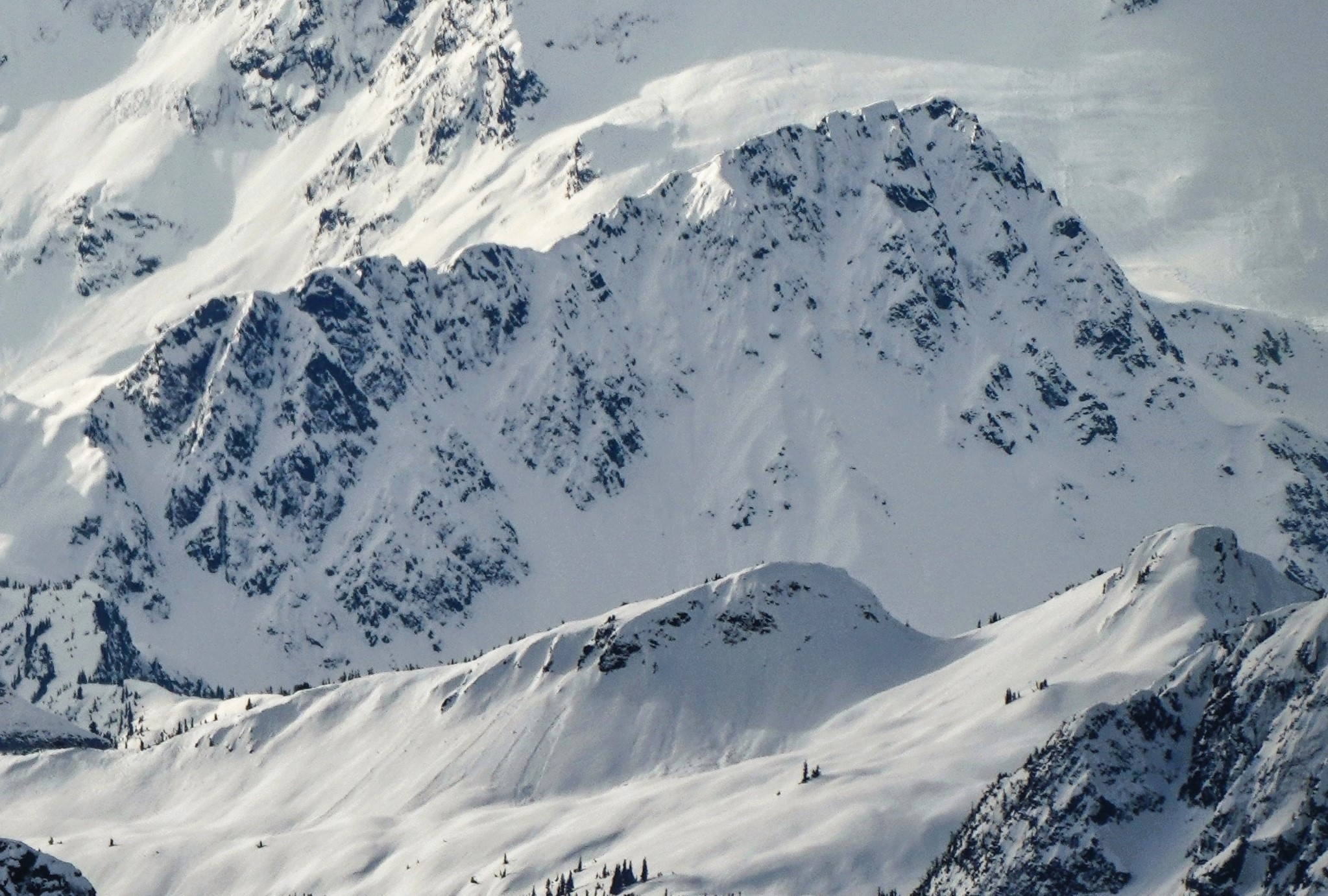
- Northeast aspect, from Mt. Taylor

Highest point
- Elevation: 2,239 m (7,346 ft)
- Prominence: 211 m (692 ft)
- Parent peak: Nannygoat Peak
- Isolation: 1.45 km (0.90 mi)
- Listing: Mountains of British Columbia
- Coordinates: 50°01′21″N 122°42′02″W

Naming
- Etymology: Carcajou

Geography
- Location within British Columbia Location within Canada
- Interactive map of Carcajou Peak
- Location: British Columbia, Canada
- District: New Westminster Land District
- Protected area: Garibaldi Provincial Park
- Parent range: Coast Mountains; McBride Range
- Topo map: NTS 92J2 Whistler

Climbing
- First ascent: 1971 John Clarke

Carcajou Peak is a 2,239-metre (7,346-foot) mountain summit in British Columbia, Canada.

== Description ==
Carcajou Peak is located 23 kilometres (14 mi) southeast of Whistler in Garibaldi Provincial Park. It is part of the McBride Range which is a subrange of the Coast Mountains. Precipitation runoff from this mountain's south slope drains into headwaters of the Cheakamus River, whereas the north slope drains to the Lillooet River via Billygoat Creek. Carcajou Peak is more notable for its steep rise above local terrain than for its absolute elevation as topographic relief is significant with the summit rising 780 metres (2,560 ft) above the Cheakamus River in 1.5 kilometres (0.93 mi) and 1,580 metres (5,184 ft) above Billygoat Creek in four kilometres (2.5 mi).

== History ==
The first ascent of the summit was made in 1971 by John Clarke. The peak was named by John Clarke and in French-speaking parts of Canada, the wolverine is referred to as carcajou. The mountain's toponym was officially adopted on November 28, 1980, by the Geographical Names Board of Canada as submitted in 1978 by Karl Ricker of the Alpine Club of Canada.

== Climate ==
Based on the Köppen climate classification, Carcajou Peak is located in the marine west coast climate zone of western North America. Most weather fronts originate in the Pacific Ocean, and travel east toward the Coast Mountains where they are forced upward by the range (orographic lift), causing them to drop their moisture in the form of rain or snowfall. As a result, the Coast Mountains experience high precipitation, especially during the winter months in the form of snowfall. Winter temperatures can drop below −20 °C with wind chill factors below −30 °C. The months of July and August offer the most favorable weather for climbing Carcajou Peak.

== See also ==
- Geography of British Columbia
- Geology of British Columbia
