= Forger Peak =

Mountain in British Columbia, Canada

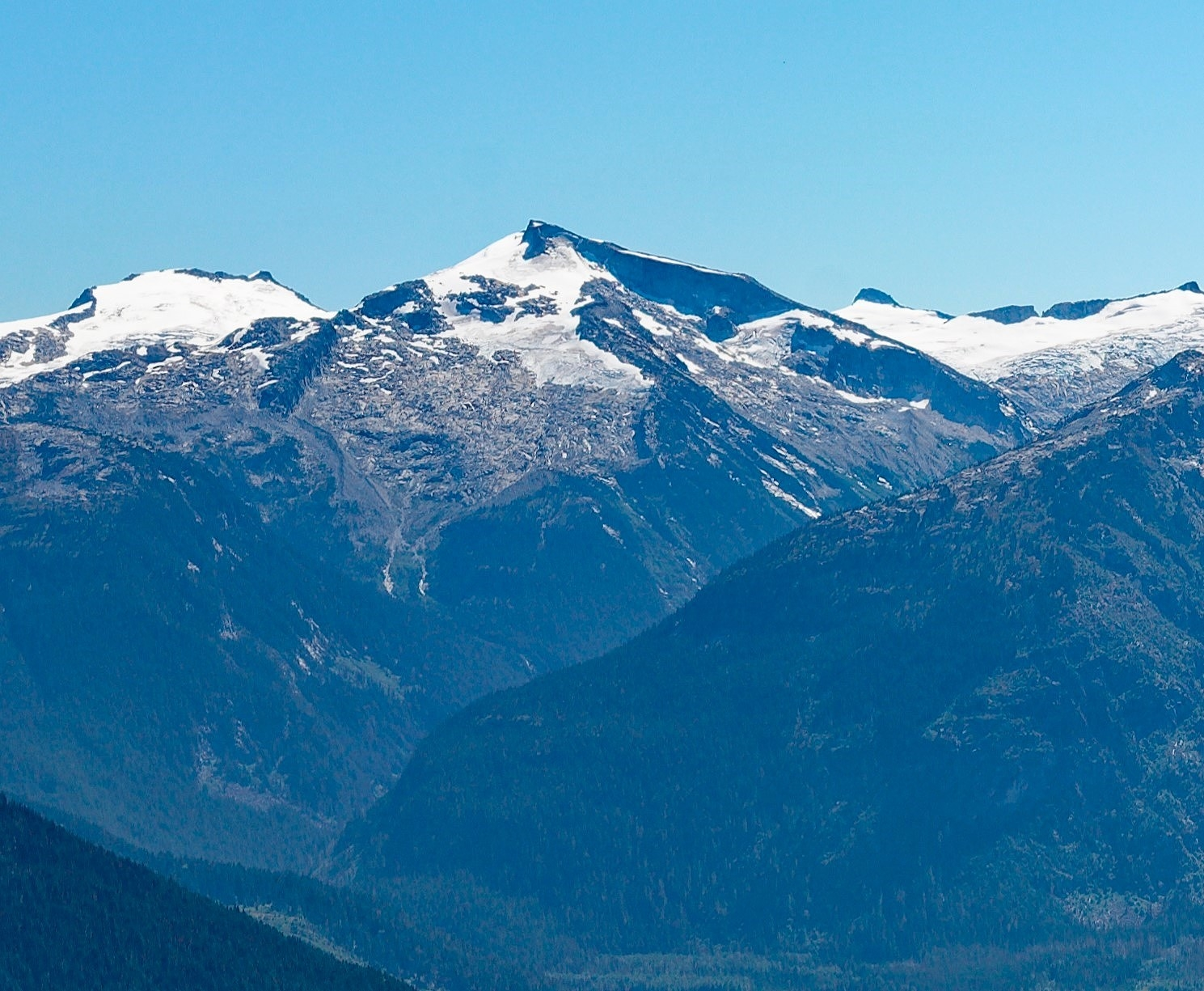
- Northwest aspect

Highest point
- Elevation: 2,423 m (7,949 ft)
- Prominence: 503 m (1,650 ft)
- Parent peak: Mount Sir Richard
- Isolation: 6.41 km (3.98 mi)
- Listing: Mountains of British Columbia
- Coordinates: 49°56′11″N 122°47′27″W

Geography
- Location within British Columbia Location within Canada
- Interactive map of Forger Peak
- Country: Canada
- Province: British Columbia
- District: New Westminster Land District
- Protected area: Garibaldi Provincial Park
- Parent range: Coast Mountains; McBride Range
- Topo map: NTS 92G15 Mamquam Mountain

Climbing
- First ascent: 1972 John Clarke

Forger Peak is a 2,423-metre (7,949-foot) mountain summit in British Columbia, Canada.

== Description ==
Forger Peak is located 23 kilometres (14 mi) southeast of Whistler in Garibaldi Provincial Park. It is part of the McBride Range which is a subrange of the Coast Mountains. Precipitation runoff and glacial meltwater from the mountain's slopes drains north to the Cheakamus River and south to the Pitt River. Forger Peak is more notable for its steep rise above local terrain than for its absolute elevation as topographic relief is significant with the west slope rising 1,223 metres (4,012 ft) in 2.75 kilometres (1.71 mi). The mountain is named in association with the officially named Forger Glacier which is a descriptive name for the forging action of the glacier in shaping the local terrain. The first ascent of the summit was made in 1972 by John Clarke and B. Samson.

== Climate ==
Based on the Köppen climate classification, Forger Peak is located in the marine west coast climate zone of western North America. Most weather fronts originate in the Pacific Ocean, and travel east toward the Coast Mountains where they are forced upward by the range (orographic lift), causing them to drop their moisture in the form of rain or snowfall. As a result, the Coast Mountains experience high precipitation, especially during the winter months in the form of snowfall. Winter temperatures can drop below −10 °C with wind chill factors below −20 °C. This climate supports the Forger Glacier on the south slope of the peak, as well as the Snow Bowl Glacier on the north slope. The months of July and August offer the most favorable weather for viewing or climbing Forger Peak.

== Gallery ==
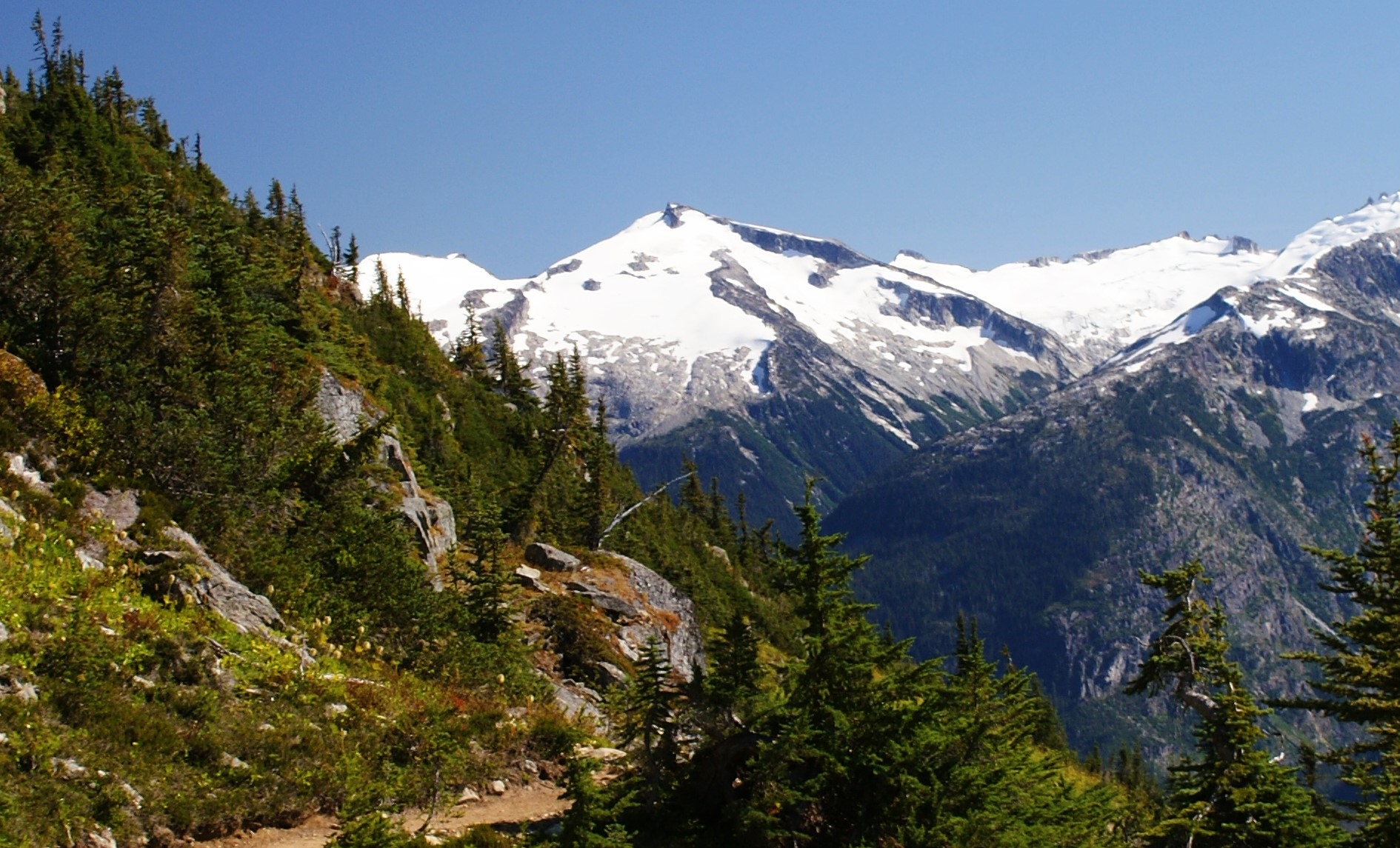
Northwest aspect centered

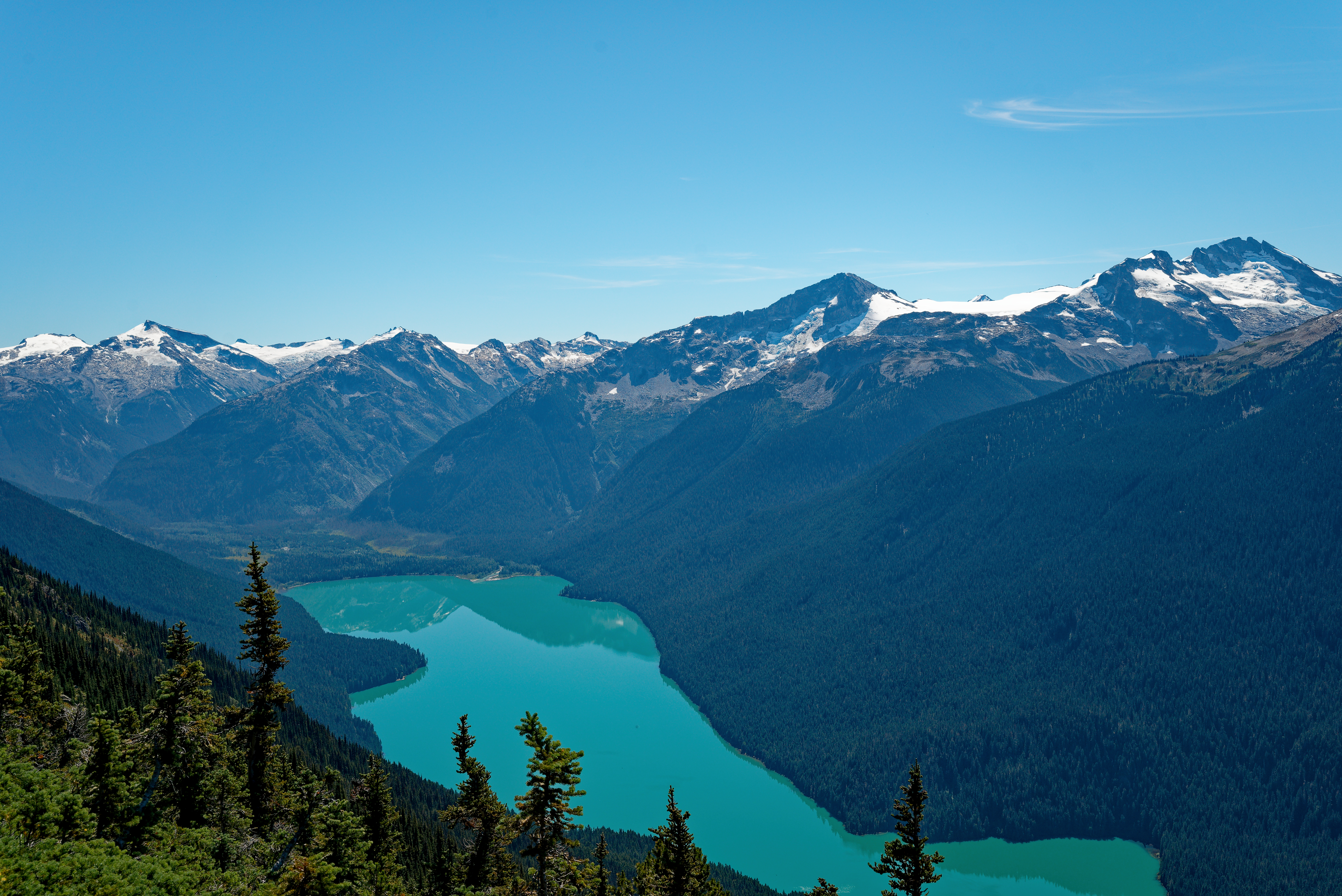
Forger Peak on left skyline, view from Whistler Mountain with Cheakamus Lake

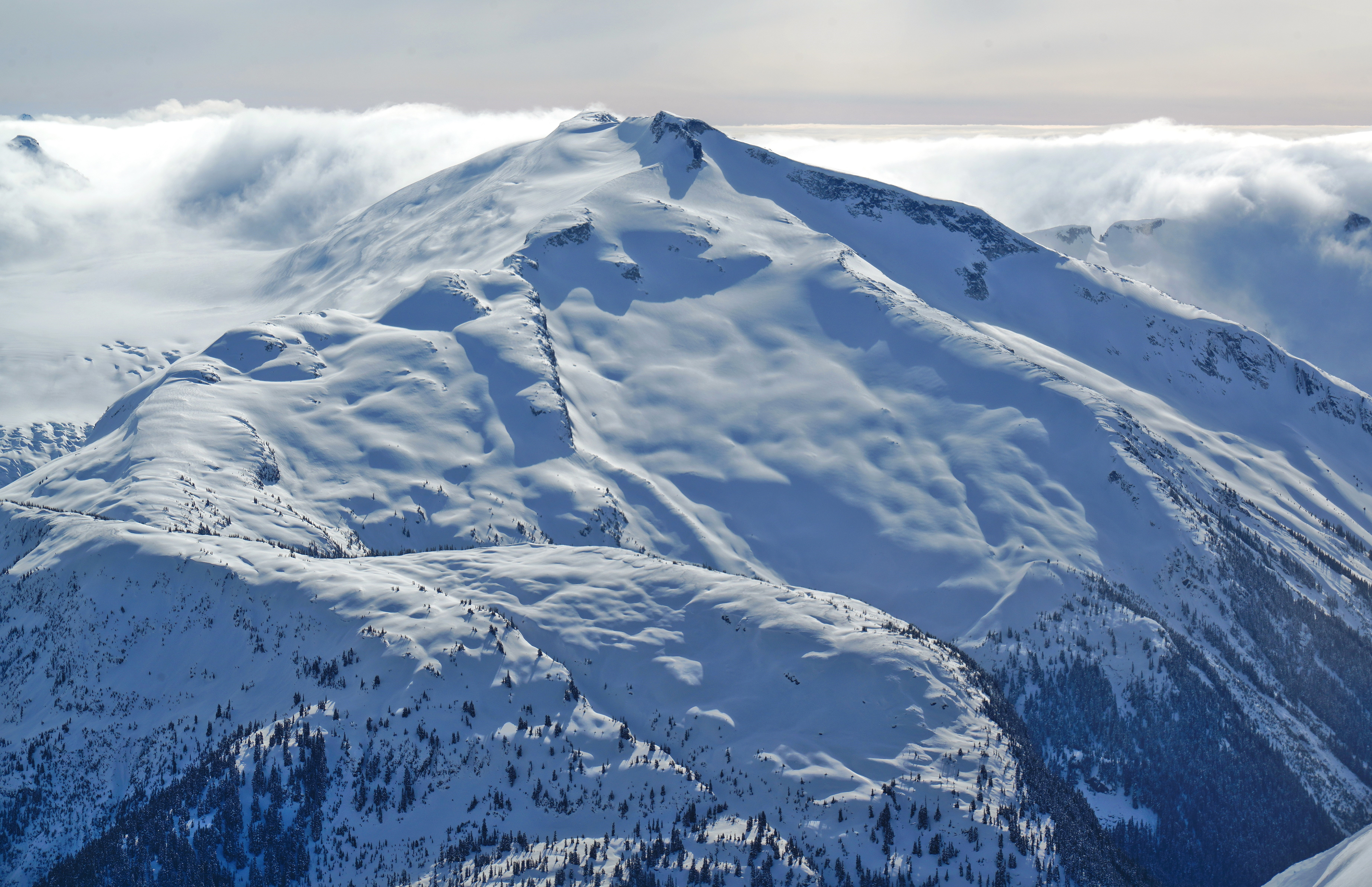
NNW aspect of Forger Peak viewed from Whirlwind Peak

== See also ==
- Geography of British Columbia
- Geology of British Columbia
