= The Lecture Cutters =

Mountains in British Columbia, Canada

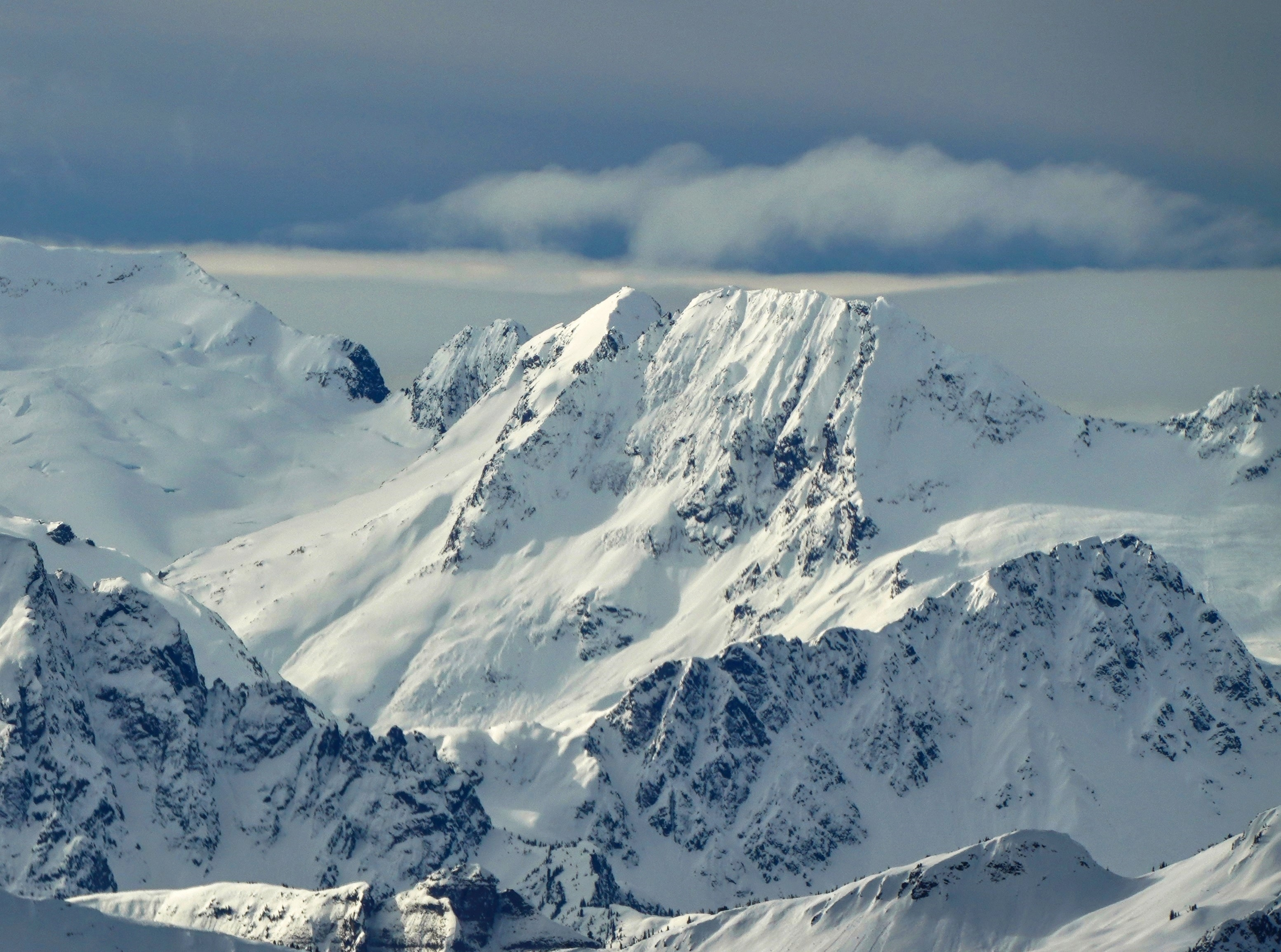
- North aspect centered, from Mt. Taylor

Highest point
- Elevation: 2,524 m (8,281 ft)
- Prominence: 124 m (407 ft)
- Parent peak: Mount Sir Richard
- Isolation: 2.35 km (1.46 mi)
- Listing: Mountains of British Columbia
- Coordinates: 49°58′52″N 122°43′02″W

Geography
- Location within British Columbia Location within Canada
- Interactive map of The Lecture Cutters
- Location: British Columbia, Canada
- District: New Westminster Land District
- Protected area: Garibaldi Provincial Park
- Parent range: Coast Mountains; McBride Range
- Topo map: NTS 92G15 Mamquam Mountain

Climbing
- First ascent: 1971 John Clarke

The Lecture Cutters are 2,524-metre (8,281-foot) mountain peaks in British Columbia, Canada.

== Description ==
The Lecture Cutters is located in the McBride Range of the Coast Mountains, and 23 kilometres (14 mi) southeast of Whistler in Garibaldi Provincial Park. It is the third-highest point of the McBride Range. Precipitation runoff and glacial meltwater from this mountain's slopes drains into the Cheakamus River. The Lecture Cutters is more notable for its steep rise above local terrain than for its absolute elevation as topographic relief is significant with the summit rising over 1,200 metres (3,937 ft) above the river in three kilometres (1.9 mi).

== Etymology ==
The mountain's toponym was officially adopted August 27, 1965, by the Geographical Names Board of Canada as proposed by Dr. Roy Hooley (1924–1996), Alpine Club of Canada and professor of civil engineering at the University of British Columbia. He was accustomed to students skipping his classes, especially members of UBC's Varsity Outdoors Club who regularly climbed in the Garibaldi Park area.

== Climate ==
Based on the Köppen climate classification, The Lecture Cutters is located in the marine west coast climate zone of western North America. Most weather fronts originate in the Pacific Ocean, and travel east toward the Coast Mountains where they are forced upward by the range (orographic lift), causing them to drop their moisture in the form of rain or snowfall. As a result, the Coast Mountains experience high precipitation, especially during the winter months in the form of snowfall. Winter temperatures can drop below −20 °C with wind chill factors below −30 °C. This climate supports the McBride Glacier on the east slope. The months of July and August offer the most favorable weather for climbing The Lecture Cutters.

== See also ==
- Geography of British Columbia
- Geology of British Columbia
