= Nivalis Mountain =

Mountain in British Columbia, Canada

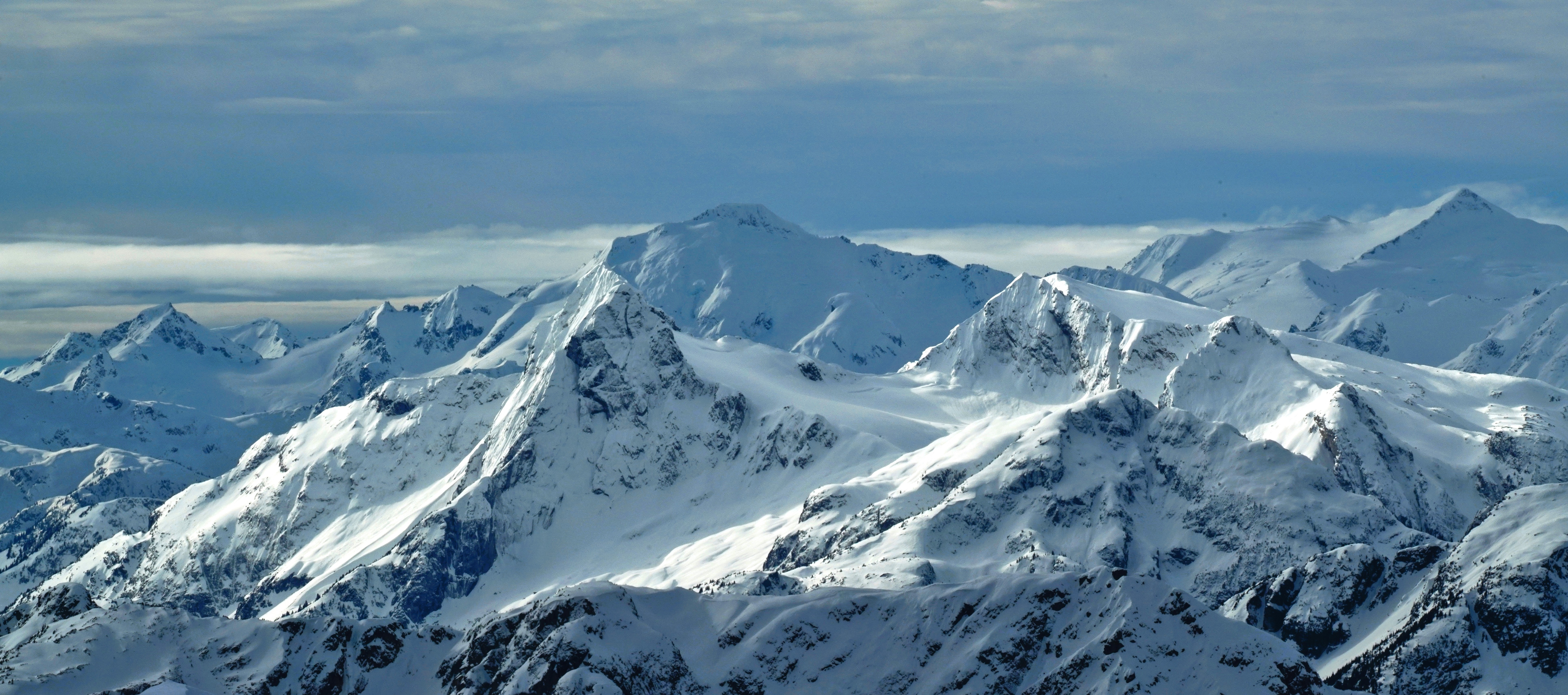
- North aspect centered at top and shaded

Highest point
- Elevation: 2,659 m (8,724 ft)
- Prominence: 413 m (1,355 ft)
- Parent peak: Mount Sir Richard
- Isolation: 3.24 km (2.01 mi)
- Listing: Mountains of British Columbia
- Coordinates: 49°58′40″N 122°39′41″W

Geography
- Location within British Columbia Location within Canada
- Interactive map of Nivalis Mountain
- Country: Canada
- Province: British Columbia
- District: New Westminster Land District
- Protected area: Garibaldi Provincial Park
- Parent range: Coast Mountains; McBride Range
- Topo map: NTS 92G15 Mamquam Mountain

Climbing
- First ascent: 1968 John Clarke

Nivalis Mountain is a 2,659-metre (8,724-foot) mountain summit in British Columbia, Canada.

== Description ==
Nivalis Mountain is located 28 kilometres (17 mi) southeast of Whistler in Garibaldi Provincial Park. It is the second-highest point of the McBride Range which is a subrange of the Coast Mountains. Precipitation runoff and glacial meltwater from this mountain's slopes drains to the Lillooet River via Billygoat Creek and Tuwasus Creek. Nivalis Mountain is notable for its steep rise above local terrain as topographic relief is significant with the summit rising 1,860 metres (6,100 ft) above Tuwasus Creek in six kilometres (3.7 mi).

== Etymology ==
The mountain was named by climber John Clarke in July 1971. Nivalis is the Latin word for snowy. The mountain's toponym was officially adopted on November 28, 1980, by the Geographical Names Board of Canada as first identified in the 1972 Canadian Alpine Journal and submitted in 1978 by Karl Ricker of the Alpine Club of Canada.

== Climate ==
Based on the Köppen climate classification, Nivalis Mountain is located in the marine west coast climate zone of western North America. Most weather fronts originate in the Pacific Ocean, and travel east toward the Coast Mountains where they are forced upward by the range (orographic lift), causing them to drop their moisture in the form of rain or snowfall. As a result, the Coast Mountains experience high precipitation, especially during the winter months in the form of snowfall. Winter temperatures can drop below −20 °C with wind chill factors below −30 °C. This climate supports the McBride Glacier west of the peak and unnamed glaciers on the peak's north and east slopes. The months of July and August offer the most favorable weather for climbing Nivalis Mountain.

== Gallery ==
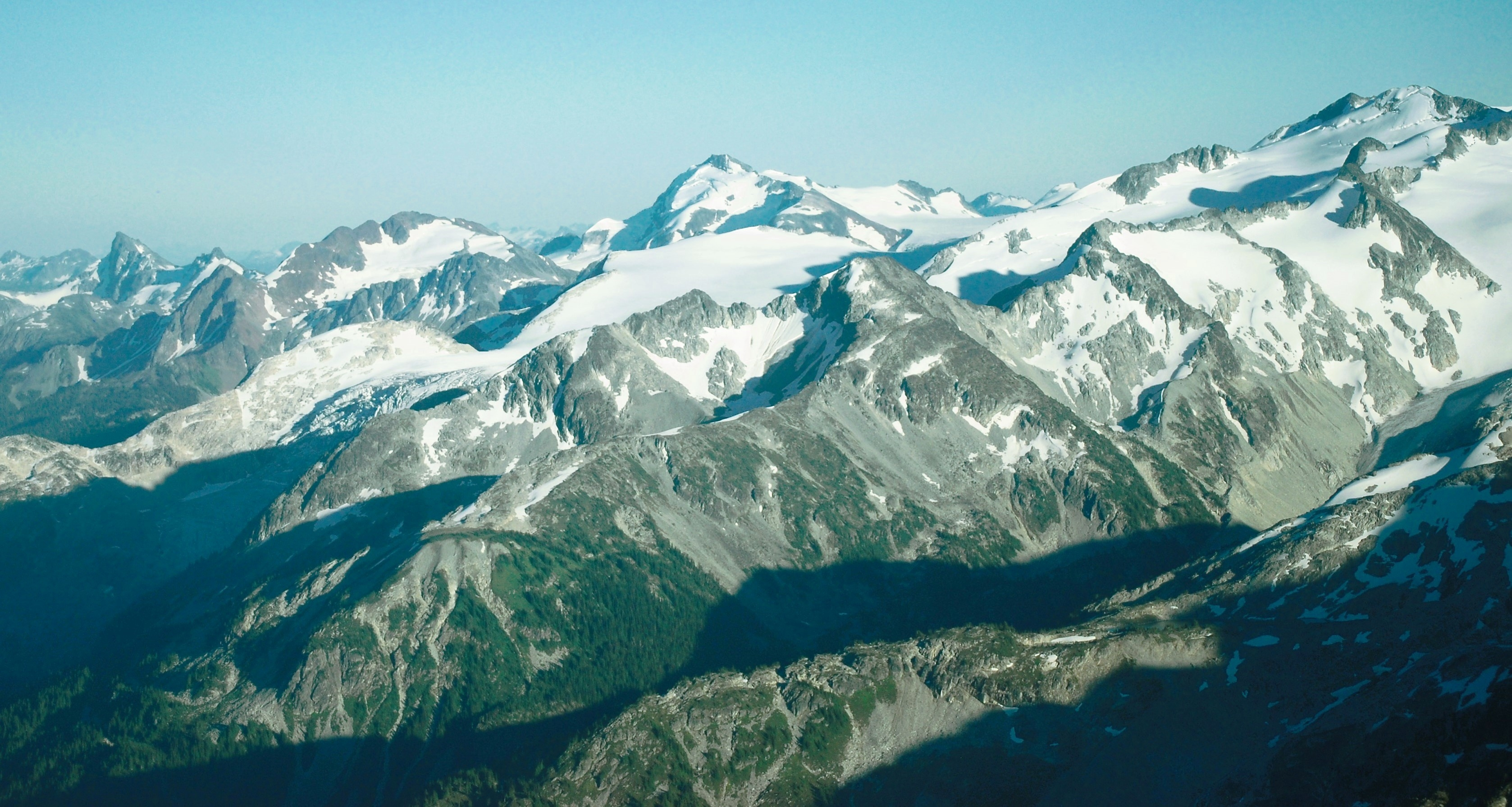
Nivalis centered on skyline from the northwest (Shudder Mountain upper right corner)

== See also ==
- Geography of British Columbia
- Geology of British Columbia
