= Outlier Peak =

Mountain in British Columbia, Canada

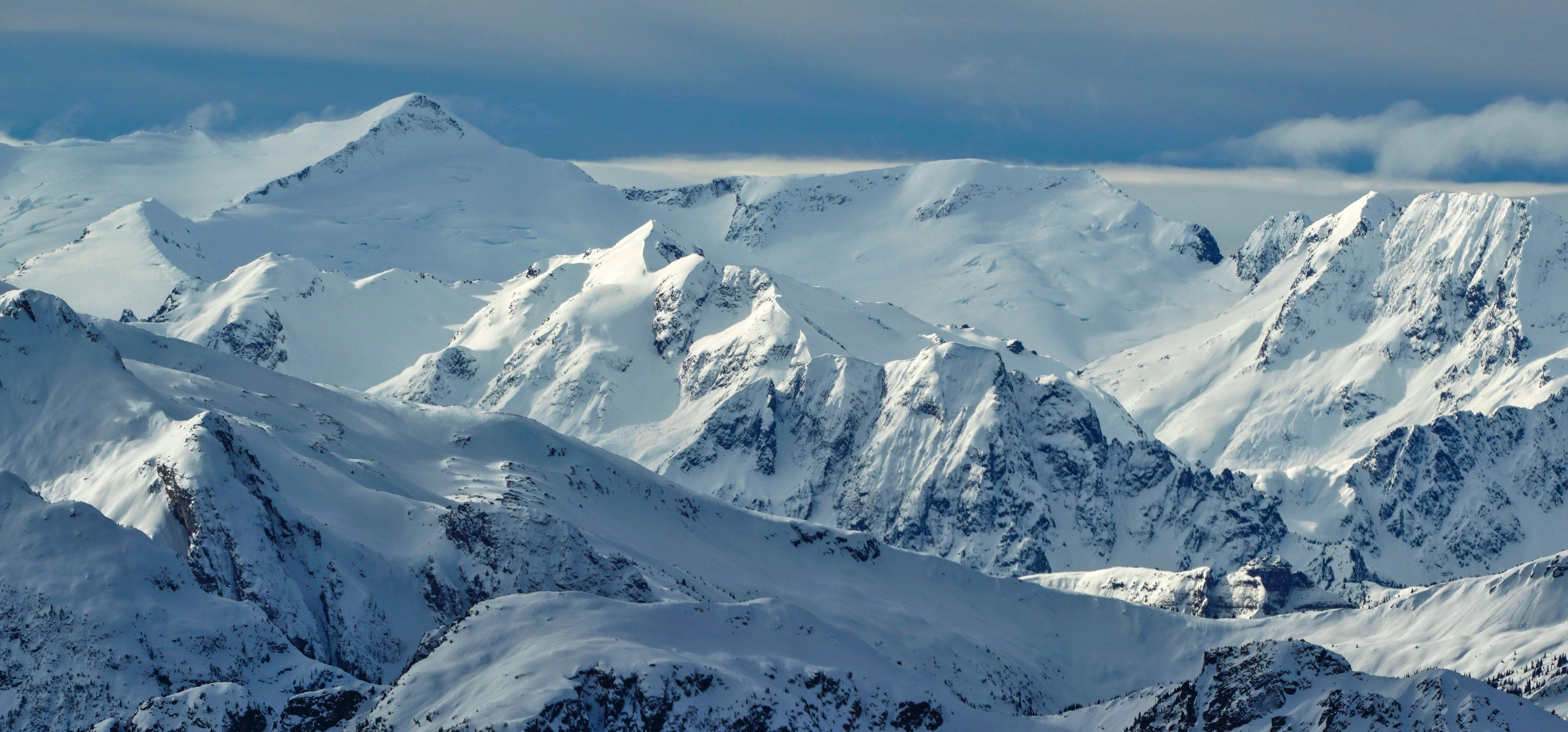
- North aspect centered, from Mt. Taylor

Highest point
- Elevation: 2,422 m (7,946 ft)
- Prominence: 593 m (1,946 ft)
- Parent peak: Nivalis Mountain
- Isolation: 3.69 km (2.29 mi)
- Listing: Mountains of British Columbia
- Coordinates: 50°00′46″N 122°40′49″W

Geography
- Location within British Columbia Location within Canada
- Interactive map of Outlier Peak
- Location: British Columbia, Canada
- District: New Westminster Land District
- Protected area: Garibaldi Provincial Park
- Parent range: Coast Mountains; McBride Range
- Topo map: NTS 92J2 Whistler

Climbing
- First ascent: 1971 John Clarke

Outlier Peak is a 2,422-metre (7,946-foot) mountain summit in British Columbia, Canada.

== Description ==
Outlier Peak is located 23 kilometres (14 mi) southeast of Whistler in Garibaldi Provincial Park. It is the sixth-highest point of the McBride Range which is a subrange of the Coast Mountains. Precipitation runoff and glacial meltwater from this mountain's west slope drains into headwaters of the Cheakamus River, whereas the other slopes drain to the Lillooet River via Billygoat Creek. Outlier Peak is more notable for its steep rise above local terrain than for its absolute elevation as topographic relief is significant with the summit rising over 900 metres (2,952 ft) above the Cheakamus River in 1.75 kilometres (1.09 mi) and over 1,800 metres (5,905 ft) above Billygoat Creek in four kilometres (2.5 mi). The mountain's toponym was officially adopted on November 28, 1980, by the Geographical Names Board of Canada as submitted in 1978 by Karl Ricker of the Alpine Club of Canada.

== Climate ==
Based on the Köppen climate classification, Outlier Peak is located in the marine west coast climate zone of western North America. Most weather fronts originate in the Pacific Ocean, and travel east toward the Coast Mountains where they are forced upward by the range (orographic lift), causing them to drop their moisture in the form of rain or snowfall. As a result, the Coast Mountains experience high precipitation, especially during the winter months in the form of snowfall. Winter temperatures can drop below −20 °C with wind chill factors below −30 °C. This climate supports small unnamed glaciers on the peak's slopes. The months of July and August offer the most favorable weather for climbing Outlier Peak.

== See also ==
- Geography of British Columbia
- Geology of British Columbia
