= Outlier (disambiguation) =

Outlier is a statistical term.

Outlier or outliers can also refer to:

- Inliers and outliers (geology), a geological term
- Anomaly detection in data mining
- Exclave, a geopolitical term
- Polynesian outlier, culturally Polynesian islands which lie in Melanesia and Micronesia
- Outlier (album), by Twelve Foot Ninja
- Outlier, an album by Kingdom Come
- Outlier (ballet), by Wayne McGregor
- Outlier Peak, a mountain in Canada
- Outlier (TV series), Norwegian TV crime drama broadcast in 2020
- Outliers (book), by Malcolm Gladwell
- Outliers (comics), a Marvel Comics team of young mutants
- Outlier, an AI training platform owned by Scale AI
