= Sessel Mountain =

Mountain in BC, Canada

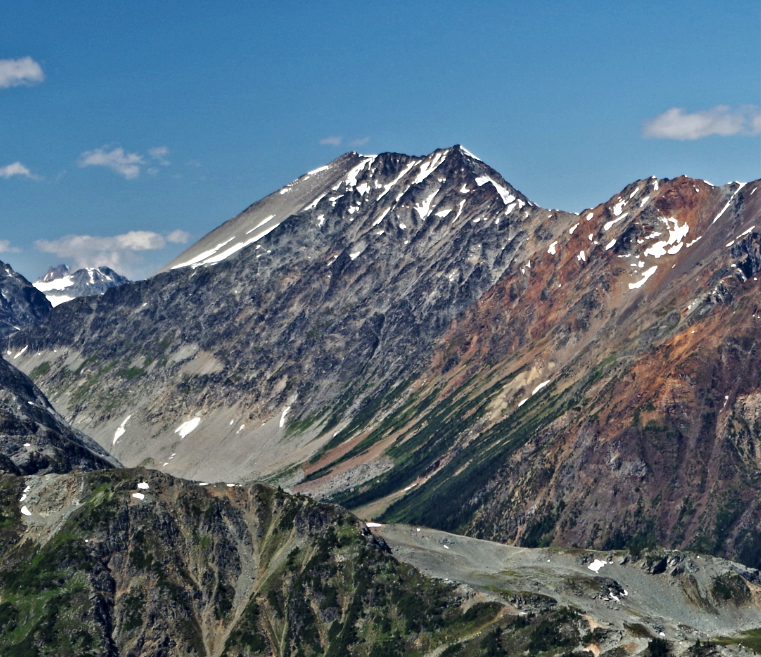
- Sessel Mountain, east aspect

Highest point
- Elevation: 2,746 m (9,009 ft)
- Prominence: 736 m (2,415 ft)
- Parent peak: Mount Sampson (2811 m)
- Listing: Mountains of British Columbia
- Coordinates: 50°39′03″N 123°10′36″W

Geography
- Location within British Columbia Location within Canada
- Interactive map of Sessel Mountain
- Location: British Columbia, Canada
- District: Lillooet Land District
- Parent range: Thiassi Range; Coast Mountains
- Topo map: NTS 92J11 North Creek

Climbing
- First ascent: 1974 by John Clarke
- Easiest route: Scrambling from south

Sessel Mountain is a 2,746-metre (9,009-foot) mountain summit located in the Thiassi Range of the Coast Mountains, in southwestern British Columbia, Canada. It is the fourth-highest point in the Thiassi Range. Sessel is situated 46 km (29 mi) northwest of Pemberton, and 4.3 km (3 mi) northwest of Mount Sampson, which is its nearest higher peak. An unnamed icefield rests on the northern side of the peak, and the Boomerang Glacier lies at the base of the south slopes. Precipitation runoff from the peak drains into tributaries of the Lillooet and Hurley Rivers. The mountain's descriptive name was submitted by mountaineer Karl Ricker of the Alpine Club of Canada for its similar shape to a sessel, the German word for "armchair". The name was officially adopted January 23, 1979, by the Geographical Names Board of Canada. The first ascent of the mountain was made in 1974 by John Clarke.

== Climate ==
Based on the Köppen climate classification, Sessel Mountain is located in a subarctic climate zone of western North America. Most weather fronts originate in the Pacific Ocean, and travel east toward the Coast Mountains where they are forced upward by the range (Orographic lift), causing them to drop their moisture in the form of rain or snowfall. As a result, the Coast Mountains experience high precipitation, especially during the winter months in the form of snowfall. Temperatures can drop below −20 °C with wind chill factors below −30 °C. The months July through September offer the most favorable weather for climbing Sessel.

== Gallery ==
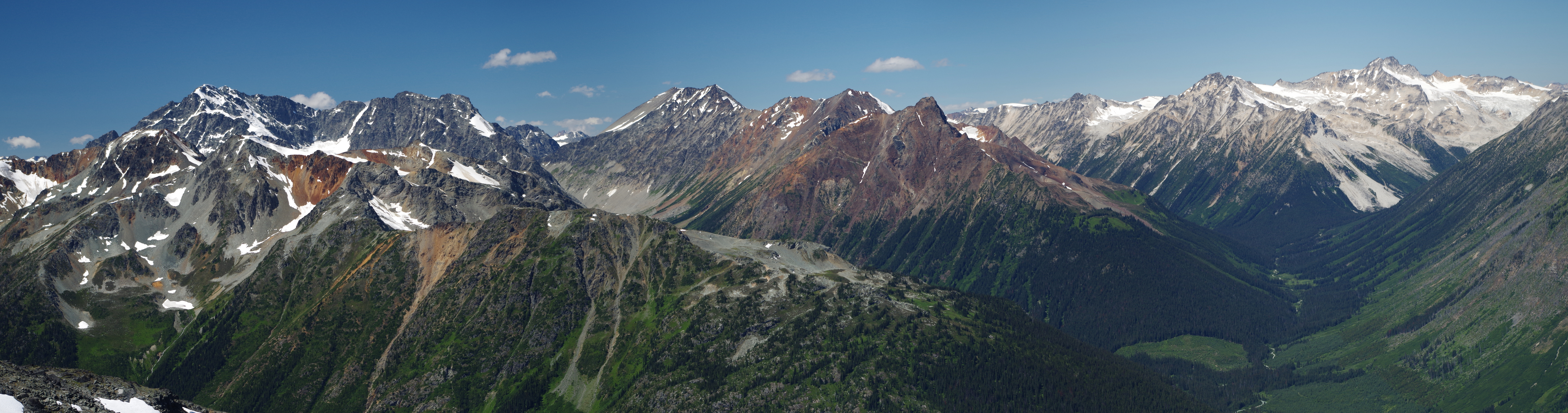
Thiassi Range with Mount Sampson (left), Sessel Mountain (middle), and Mount Thiassi (right). Viewed from Grouty Peak.

== See also ==
- Geography of British Columbia
- Geology of British Columbia
