= Mount Pitt =

Summit in British Columbia, Canada

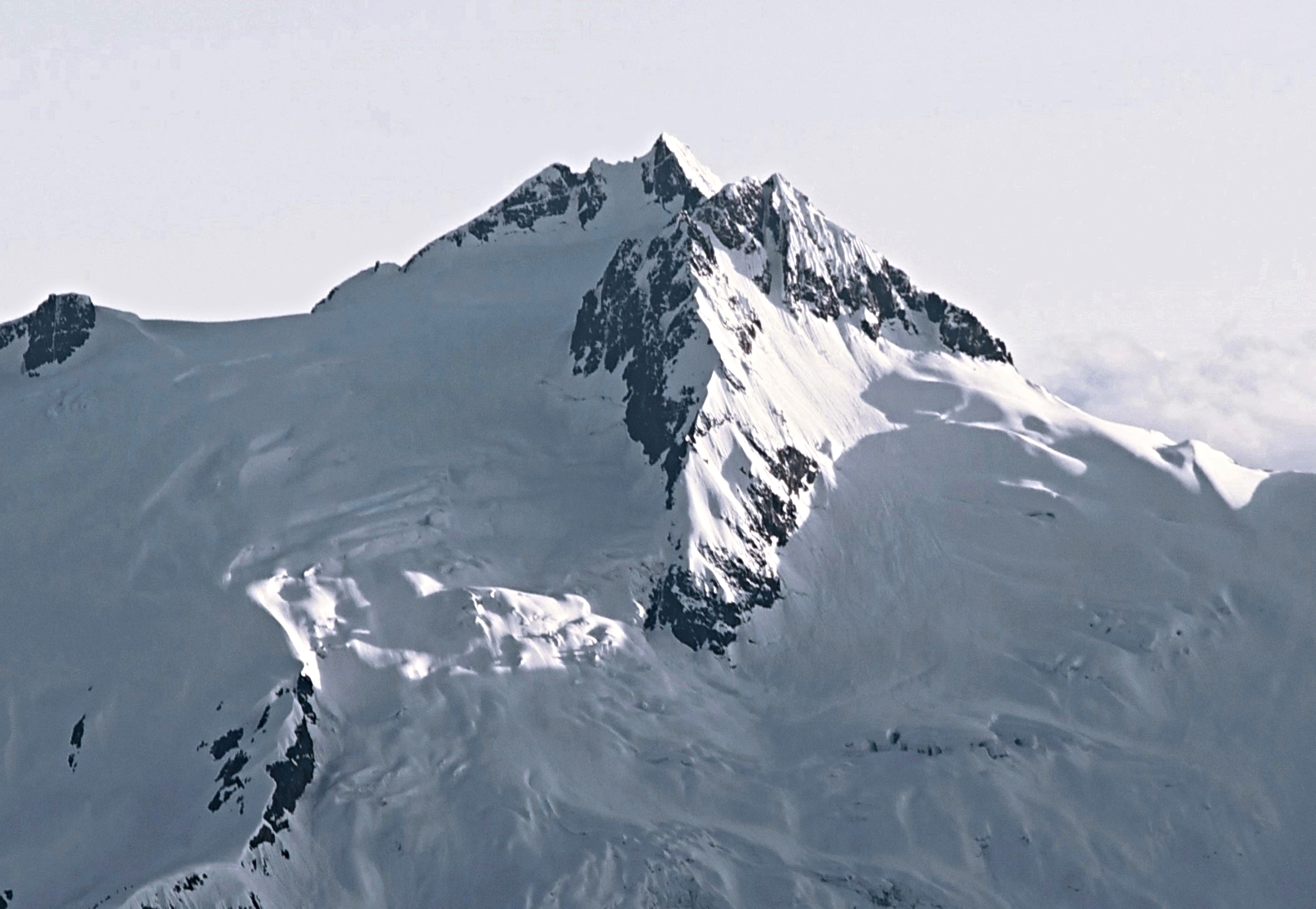
- Northeast aspect

Highest point
- Elevation: 2,487 m (8,159 ft)
- Prominence: 1,057 m (3,468 ft)
- Isolation: 9.04 km (5.62 mi)
- Listing: Mountains of British Columbia
- Coordinates: 49°52′40″N 122°42′14″W

Naming
- Etymology: William Pitt the Younger

Geography
- Location within British Columbia Location within Canada
- Interactive map of Mount Pitt
- Country: Canada
- Province: British Columbia
- District: New Westminster Land District
- Protected area: Garibaldi Provincial Park
- Parent range: Coast Mountains; McBride Range
- Topo map: NTS 92G15 Mamquam Mountain

Climbing
- First ascent: 1938, Jenkins brothers

Mount Pitt is a 2,487-metre (8,159-foot) summit in British Columbia, Canada.

== Description ==
Mount Pitt is located in the McBride Range of the Coast Mountains, and 32 kilometres (20 mi) southeast of Whistler in Garibaldi Provincial Park. The remote peak is the fourth-highest point of the McBride Range and 37th-highest peak within the park. Precipitation runoff and glacial meltwater from this mountain's north and east slopes drains to the Lillooet River via Tuwasus Creek, whereas the south and west slopes drain to the Pitt River. Mount Pitt is more notable for its steep rise above local terrain than for its absolute elevation as topographic relief is significant with the summit rising 1,487 metres (4,880 ft) above Tuwasus Creek in three kilometres (1.9 mi) and the west aspect rises approximately 1,200 metres (3,937 ft) in 1.5 kilometres (0.93 mi). This mountain is located near the head of Pitt River, which is named after William Pitt the Younger (1759–1806), and the mountain's toponym was officially adopted August 14, 1952, by the Geographical Names Board of Canada.

== Climate ==
Based on the Köppen climate classification, Mount Pitt is located in the marine west coast climate zone of western North America. Weather fronts originating in the Pacific Ocean move east toward the Coast Mountains where they are forced upward by the range (orographic lift), causing them to drop their moisture in the form of rain or snow. As a result, the Coast Mountains experience high precipitation, especially during the winter months in the form of snowfall. Winter temperatures can drop below −20 °C with wind chill factors below −30 °C. This climate supports the Solitude Glacier on the east slopes. The months of July and August offer the most favorable weather for climbing Mount Pitt.

== Gallery ==
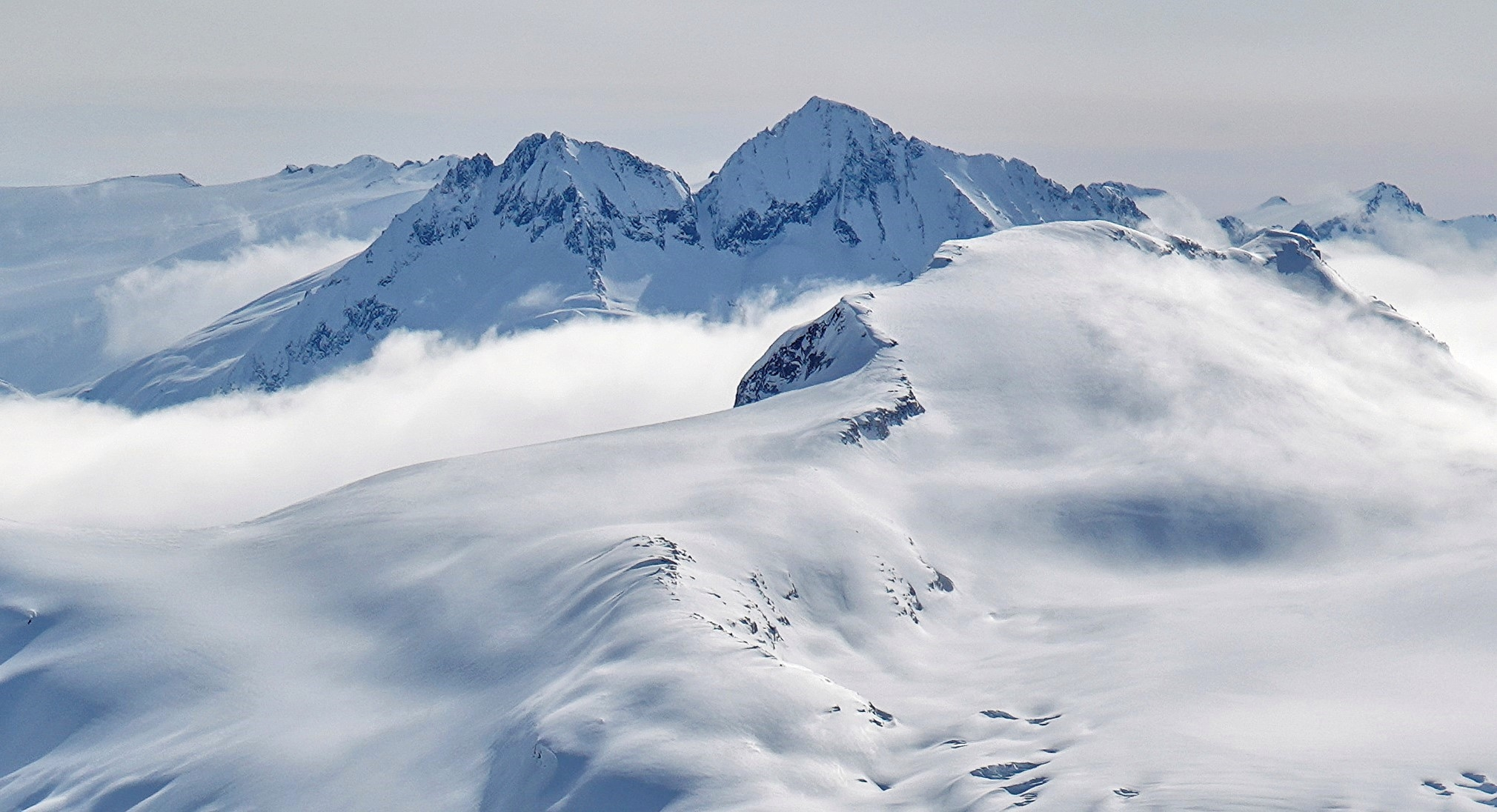
Northwest aspect of Mount Pitt in winter

== See also ==
- Geography of British Columbia
- Geology of British Columbia
