= Mount Thiassi =

Mountain in the country of Canada

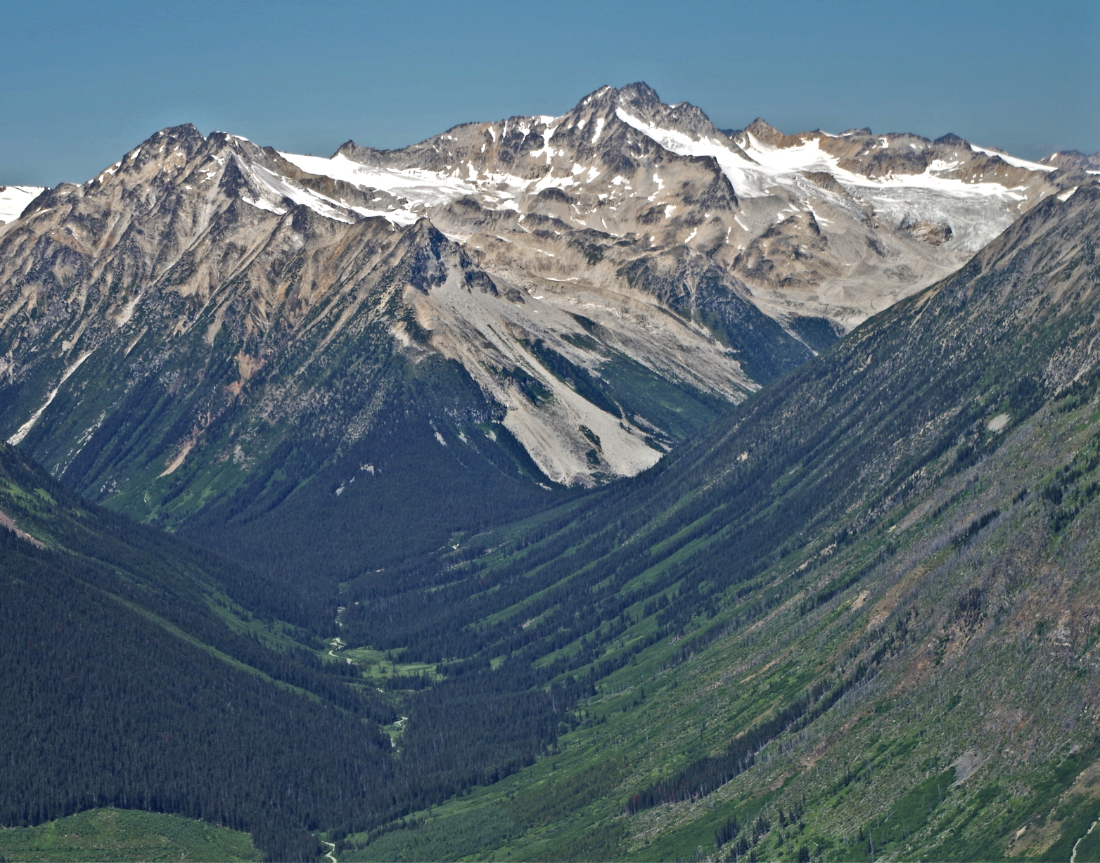
- Mount Thiassi, southeast aspect

Highest point
- Elevation: 2,772 m (9,094 ft)
- Prominence: 562 m (1,844 ft)
- Parent peak: Mount Vayu (2794 m)
- Listing: Mountains of British Columbia
- Coordinates: 50°42′52″N 123°10′58″W

Geography
- Location within British Columbia Location within Canada
- Interactive map of Mount Thiassi
- Location: British Columbia, Canada
- District: Lillooet Land District
- Parent range: Thiassi Range; Coast Mountains
- Topo map: NTS 92J11 North Creek

Climbing
- First ascent: 1965 Dick Culbert, Alice Purdey
- Easiest route: Scrambling from south

Mount Thiassi is a 2,772-metre (9,094-foot) mountain summit located in the Thiassi Range of the Coast Mountains, in southwestern British Columbia, Canada. It is the third-highest point in the Thiassi Range. Mount Thiassi is situated 56 km (35 mi) northwest of Pemberton, and 6.9 km (4 mi) south-southwest of Mount Vayu, which is its nearest higher peak. Precipitation runoff from the peak and meltwater from unnamed glaciers on its slopes drain into tributaries of the Lillooet, Bridge, and Hurley Rivers. The first ascent of the mountain was made in 1965 by Dick Culbert and Alice Purdey. The mountain's name was submitted by this first ascent party to commemorate Thiassi, the god of storms according to Norse mythology. The name was officially adopted June 22, 1967, by the Geographical Names Board of Canada.

== Climate ==
Based on the Köppen climate classification, Mount Thiassi is located in a subarctic climate zone of western North America. Most weather fronts originate in the Pacific Ocean, and travel east toward the Coast Mountains where they are forced upward by the range (Orographic lift), causing them to drop their moisture in the form of rain or snowfall. As a result, the Coast Mountains experience high precipitation, especially during the winter months in the form of snowfall. Winter temperatures can drop below −20 °C with wind chill factors below −30 °C. The months July through September offer the most favorable weather for climbing Thiassi.

== Gallery ==
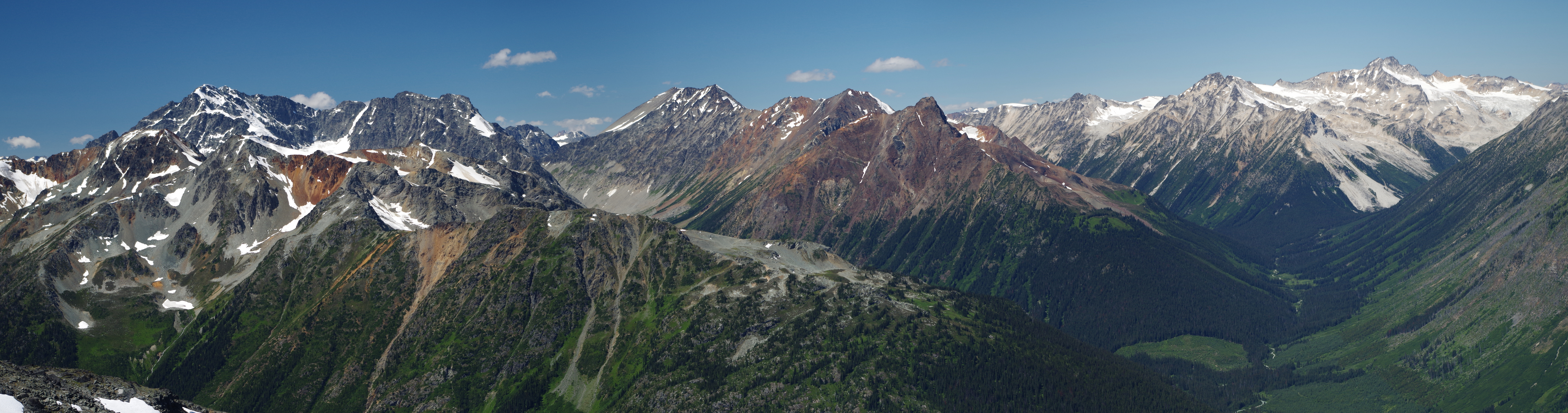
Thiassi Range with Mount Sampson (left), Sessel Mountain (middle), and Mount Thiassi (right). Viewed from Grouty Peak

== See also ==
- Geography of British Columbia
- Geology of British Columbia
