= McBride Range =

Mountain range in British Columbia, Canada

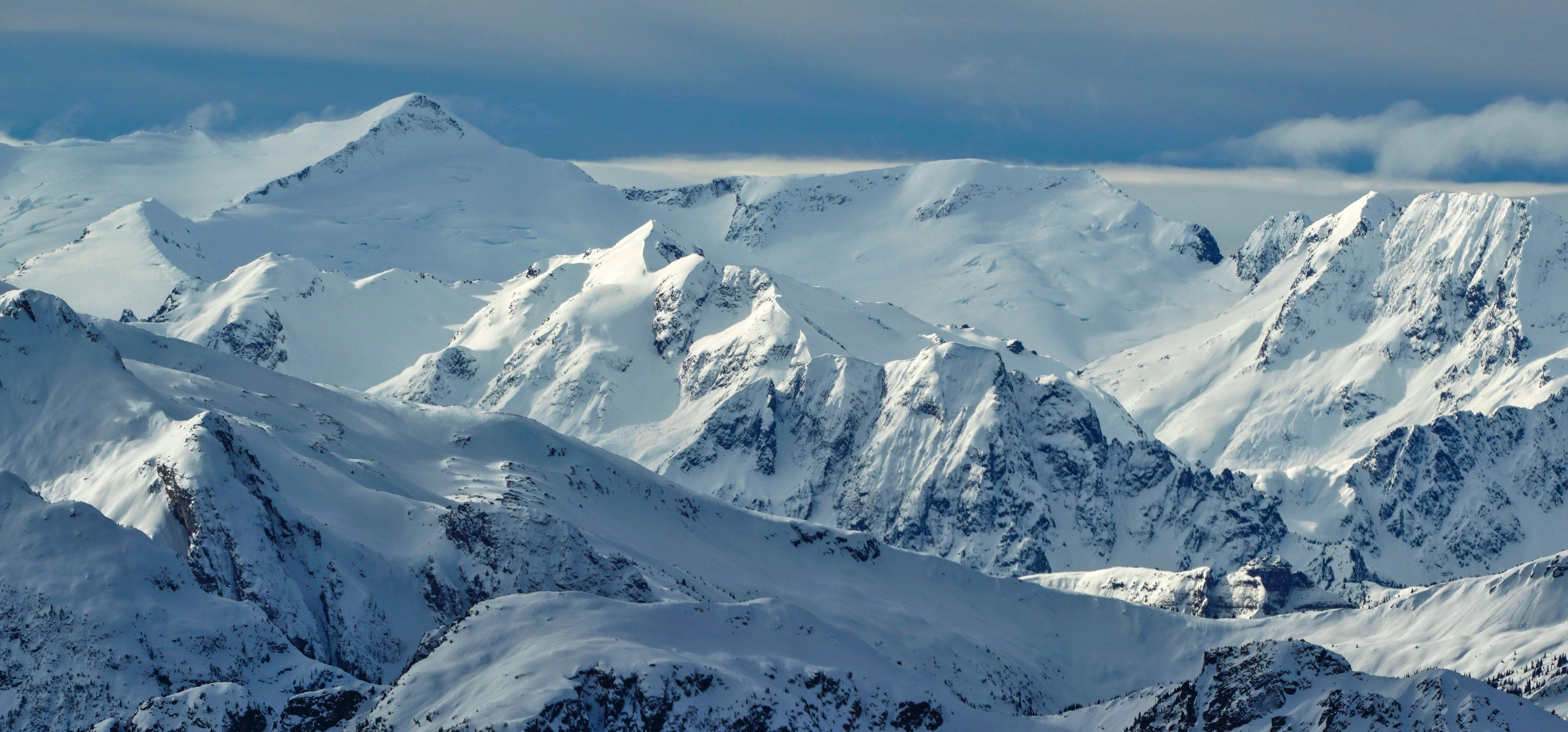
- Mount Sir Richard (upper left), Outlier Peak (centered), The Lecture Cutters (far right)

Highest point
- Peak: Mount Sir Richard
- Elevation: 2,681 m (8,796 ft)

Geography
- Location within British Columbia
- Country: Canada
- Region: British Columbia
- Range coordinates: 50°01′N 122°40′W
- Parent range: Garibaldi Ranges

The McBride Range is a small mountain range in southwestern British Columbia, Canada, located east of Cheakamus Lake at the northeast side of Garibaldi Provincial Park. It has an area of 228 km^{2} and is a subrange of the Garibaldi Ranges which in turn form part of the Pacific Ranges of the Coast Mountains. The four highest peaks of the range are Mount Sir Richard (2,681 m), Nivalis Mountain (2,659 m), The Lecture Cutters (2,524 m), and Mount Pitt (2,487 m). Other notable peaks include Outlier Peak, Forger Peak and In-SHUCK-ch Mountain.

== See also ==
- List of mountain ranges
