= In-SHUCK-ch Mountain =

Mountain in British Columbia, Canada

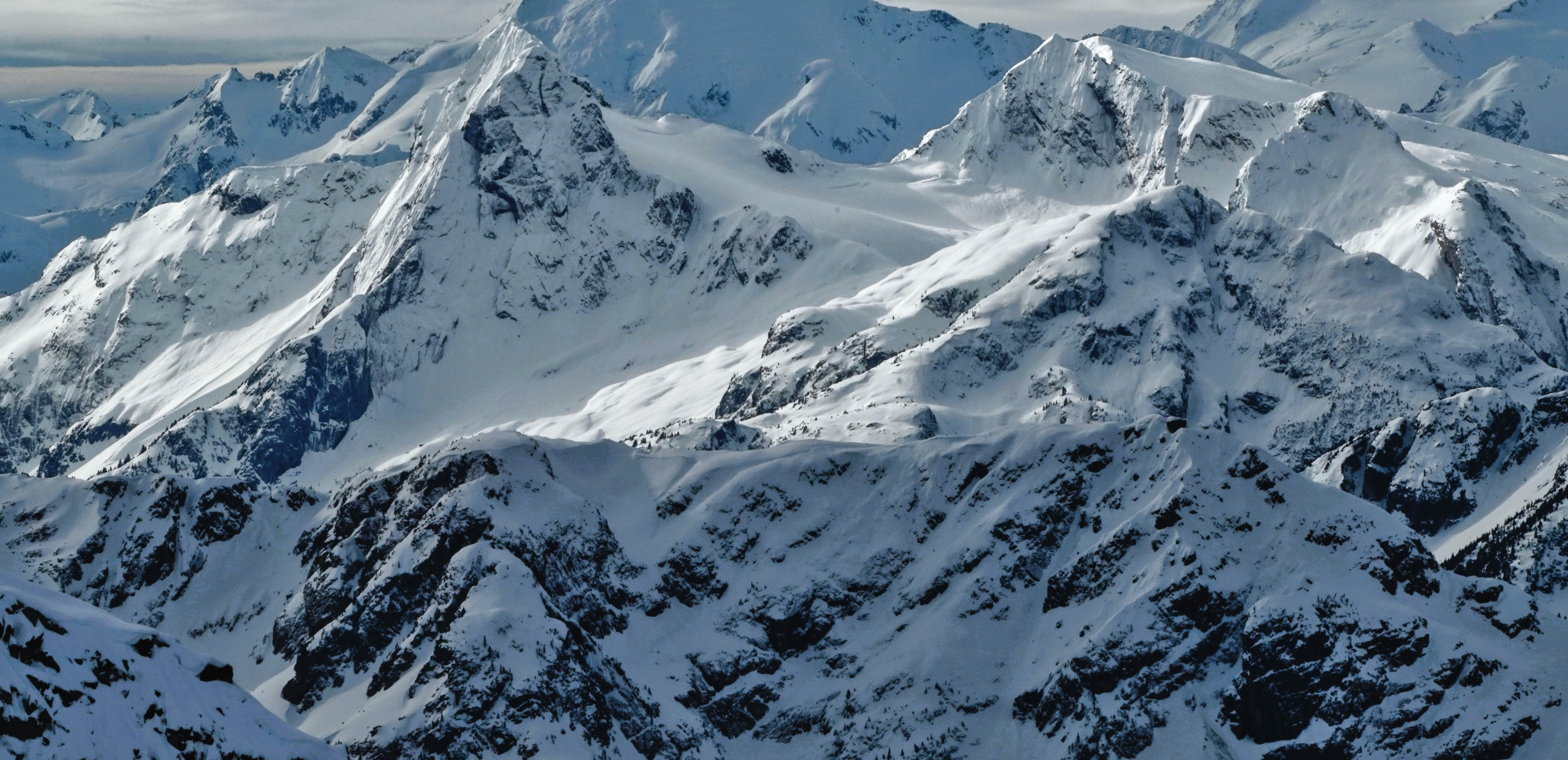
- North aspect, from Mt. Taylor

Highest point
- Elevation: 2,386 m (7,828 ft)
- Prominence: 486 m (1,594 ft)
- Parent peak: Wedge Mountain
- Isolation: 8.27 km (5.14 mi)
- Listing: Mountains of British Columbia
- Coordinates: 50°06′59″N 122°35′37″W

Geography
- Location within British Columbia Location within Canada
- Interactive map of In-SHUCK-ch Mountain
- Country: Canada
- Province: British Columbia
- District: New Westminster Land District
- Protected area: Garibaldi Provincial Park
- Parent range: Coast Mountains
- Topo map: NTS 92J2 Whistler

Climbing
- First ascent: 1967 John Clarke

In-SHUCK-ch Mountain is a 2,386-metre (7,828-foot) summit in British Columbia, Canada.

== Description ==
In-SHUCK-ch Mountain is located 26 kilometres (16 mi) east of Whistler in Garibaldi Provincial Park and the Coast Mountains. Precipitation runoff and glacial meltwater from this mountain drains into tributaries of the Lillooet River. In-SHUCK-ch Mountain is more notable for its steep rise above local terrain than for its absolute elevation as topographic relief is significant with the summit rising 2,186 metres (7,172 ft) above Little Lillooet Lake in four kilometres (2.5 mi).

== History ==
The mountain was officially named Gunsight Peak in 1978, but officially changed on August 13, 1992, by the Geographical Names Board of Canada. The name of the mountain is pronounced In-SHUCK-ch, meaning "split like a crutch", which refers to the split gap of the summit area. The people of the In-SHUCK-ch Nation took their name from this sacred mountain. In-SHUCK-ch Mountain is significant in the origin stories of the people, as the mountain provided a refuge from a great flood.

== Climate ==
Based on the Köppen climate classification, In-SHUCK-ch Mountain is located in the marine west coast climate zone of western North America. Most weather fronts originate in the Pacific Ocean, and travel east toward the Coast Mountains where they are forced upward by the range (orographic lift), causing them to drop their moisture in the form of rain or snowfall. As a result, the Coast Mountains experience high precipitation, especially during the winter months in the form of snowfall. Winter temperatures can drop below −20 °C with wind chill factors below −30 °C. This climate supports an unnamed glacier on the north slope of the peak. The months of July and August offer the most favorable weather for climbing or viewing In-SHUCK-ch Mountain.

== Gallery ==
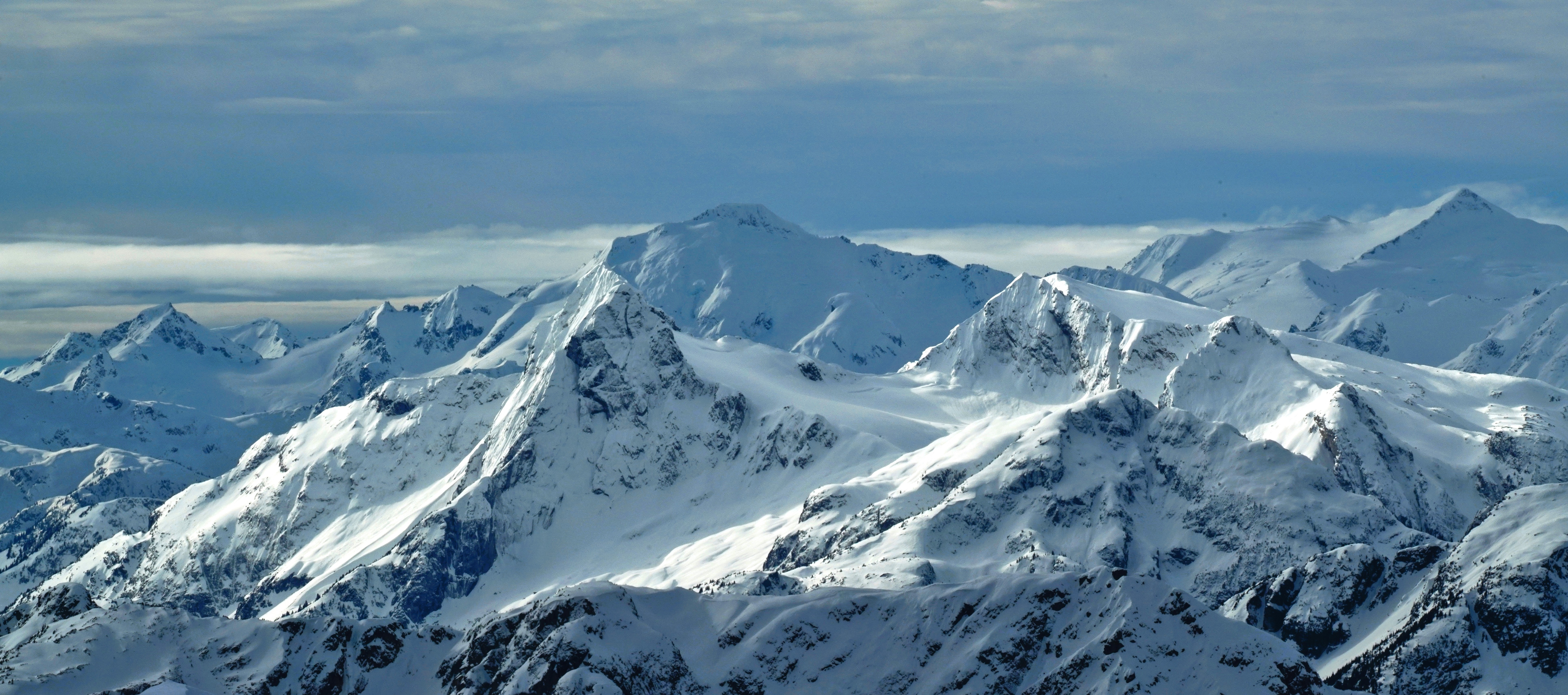
In-SHUCK-ch Mountain in front.
Nivalis Mountain centered at top, Mount Sir Richard at far right.

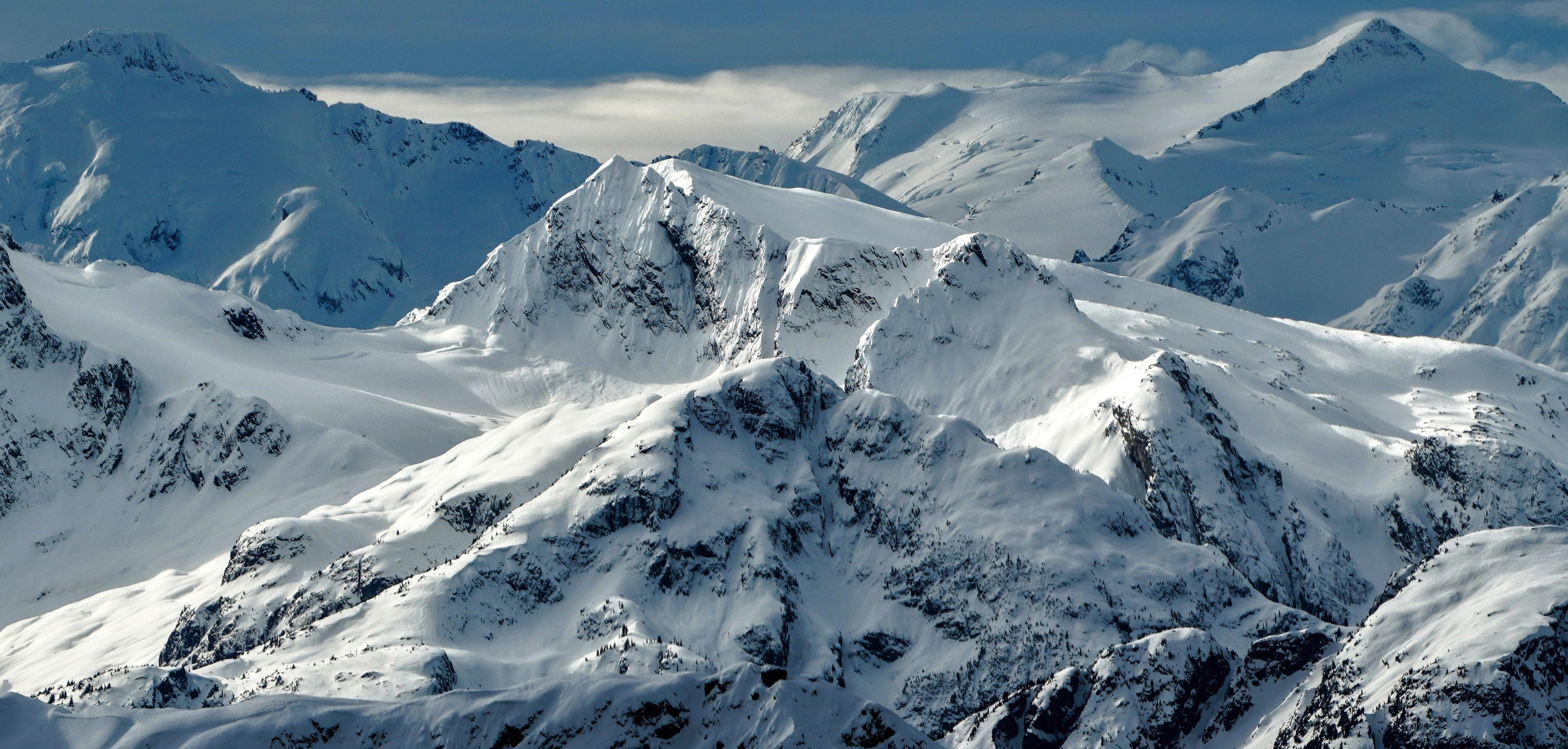
Nivalis Mountain (upper left corner) and Mount Sir Richard (upper right corner) with the Southwest peak of In-shuck-ch Mountain centered.

== See also ==
- Geography of British Columbia
- Geology of British Columbia
