= Mount Sampson =

Mountain in the country of Canada

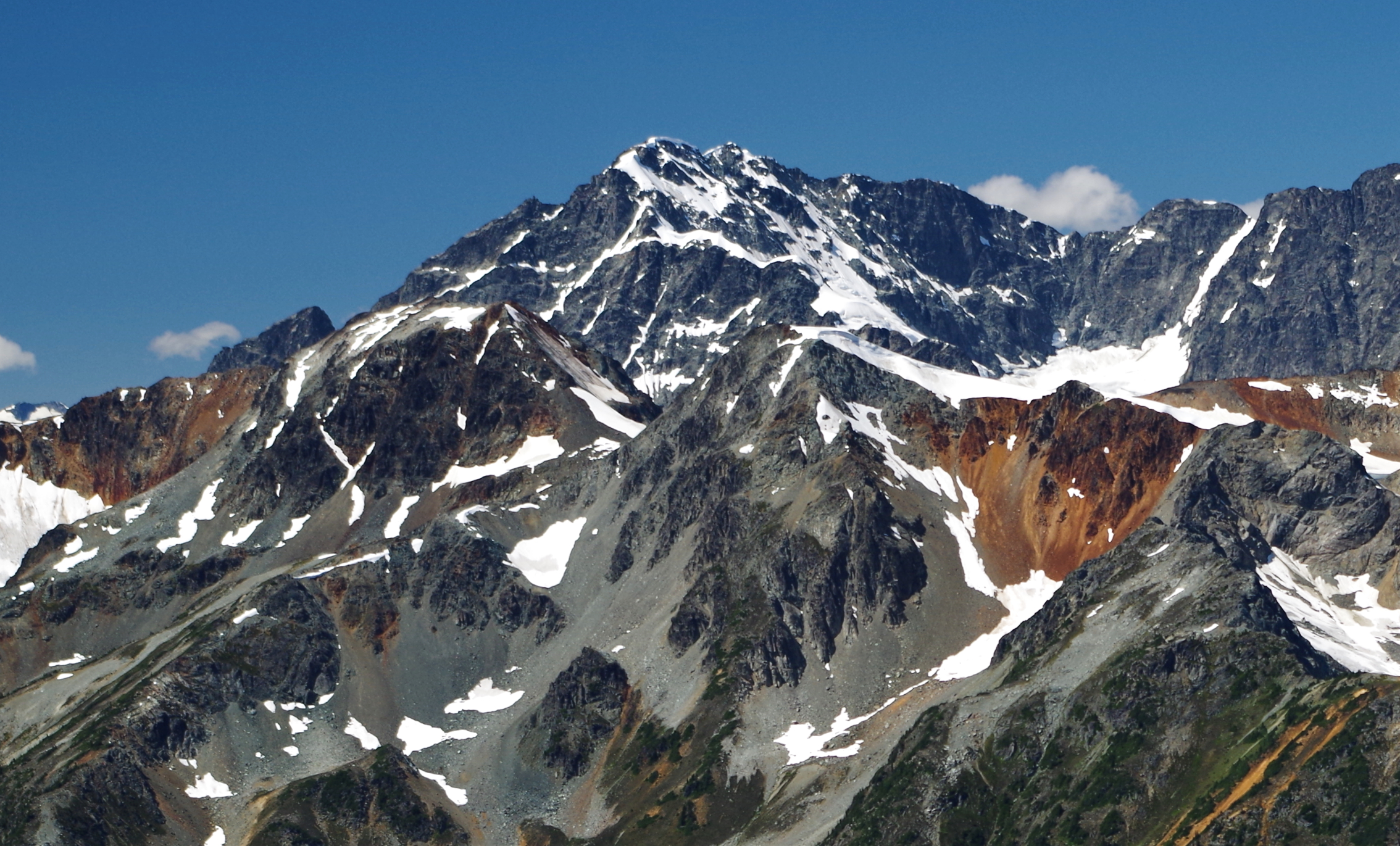
- Mount Sampson, east aspect

Highest point
- Elevation: 2,811 m (9,222 ft)
- Prominence: 1,261 m (4,137 ft)
- Parent peak: Mount Ethelweard (2819 m)
- Listing: Mountains of British Columbia
- Coordinates: 50°37′15″N 123°08′15″W

Geography
- Location within British Columbia Location within Canada
- Interactive map of Mount Sampson
- Location: British Columbia, Canada
- District: Lillooet Land District
- Parent range: Thiassi Range; Coast Mountains
- Topo map: NTS 92J11 North Creek

Climbing
- First ascent: 1935 by J. Ronayne, R. Ronayne, P. Tait
- Easiest route: Scrambling class 3 from south

Mount Sampson is a 2,811-metre (9,222-foot) mountain summit located in the Thiassi Range of the Coast Mountains, in the Pemberton Valley of southwestern British Columbia, Canada. It is the highest point in the Thiassi Range. Sampson is situated 41 km (25 mi) northwest of Pemberton, and 21.5 km (13 mi) southeast of Mount Ethelweard, which is its nearest higher peak. Precipitation runoff from the peak drains into tributaries of the Lillooet and Hurley Rivers.

The mountain was named in association with Sampson Creek, which flows south from the mountain. In 1911, E.N. Sampson acquired a preemption located on the east side of the locally named Sampson Creek. It was spelled Samson Mountain when it was first adopted in 1967 on maps. The spelling was officially corrected and adopted April 29, 1983, by the Geographical Names Board of Canada to conform with the creek. The first ascent of the mountain was made in 1935 by Preston Tait, John Ronayne, and Ronald Ronayne.

== Climate ==
Based on the Köppen climate classification, Mount Sampson is located in a subarctic climate zone of western North America. Most weather fronts originate in the Pacific Ocean, and travel east toward the Coast Mountains where they are forced upward by the range (Orographic lift), causing them to drop their moisture in the form of rain or snowfall. As a result, the Coast Mountains experience high precipitation, especially during the winter months in the form of snowfall. Temperatures can drop below −20 °C with wind chill factors below −30 °C. The mountain and its climate support an unnamed glacier on its northern slope. The months July through September offer the most favorable weather for climbing Sampson.

== Gallery ==
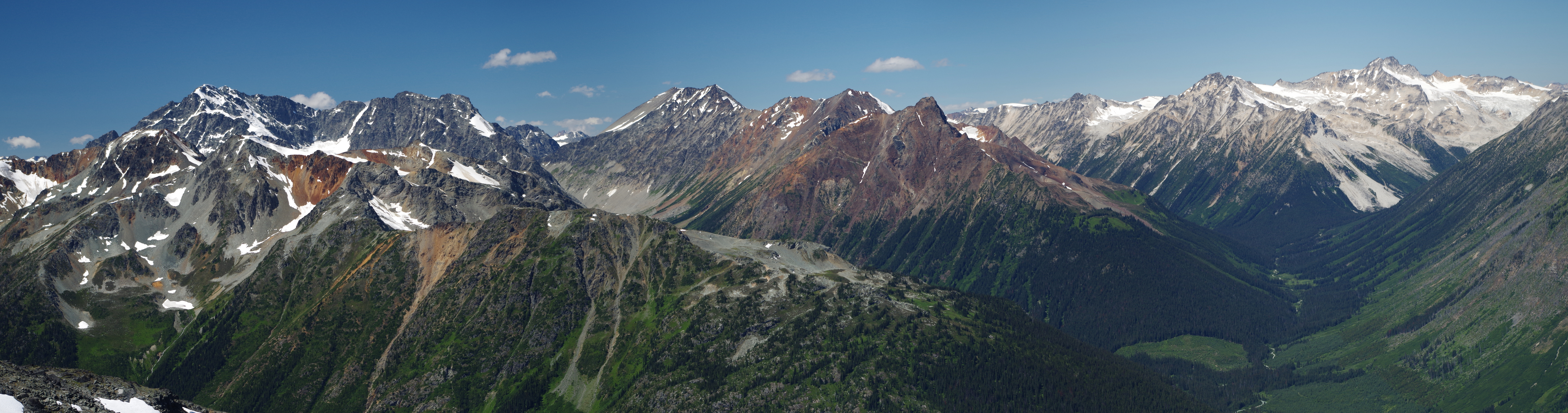
Thiassi Range with Mount Sampson (left), Sessel Mountain (middle), and Mount Thiassi (right). Viewed from Grouty Peak

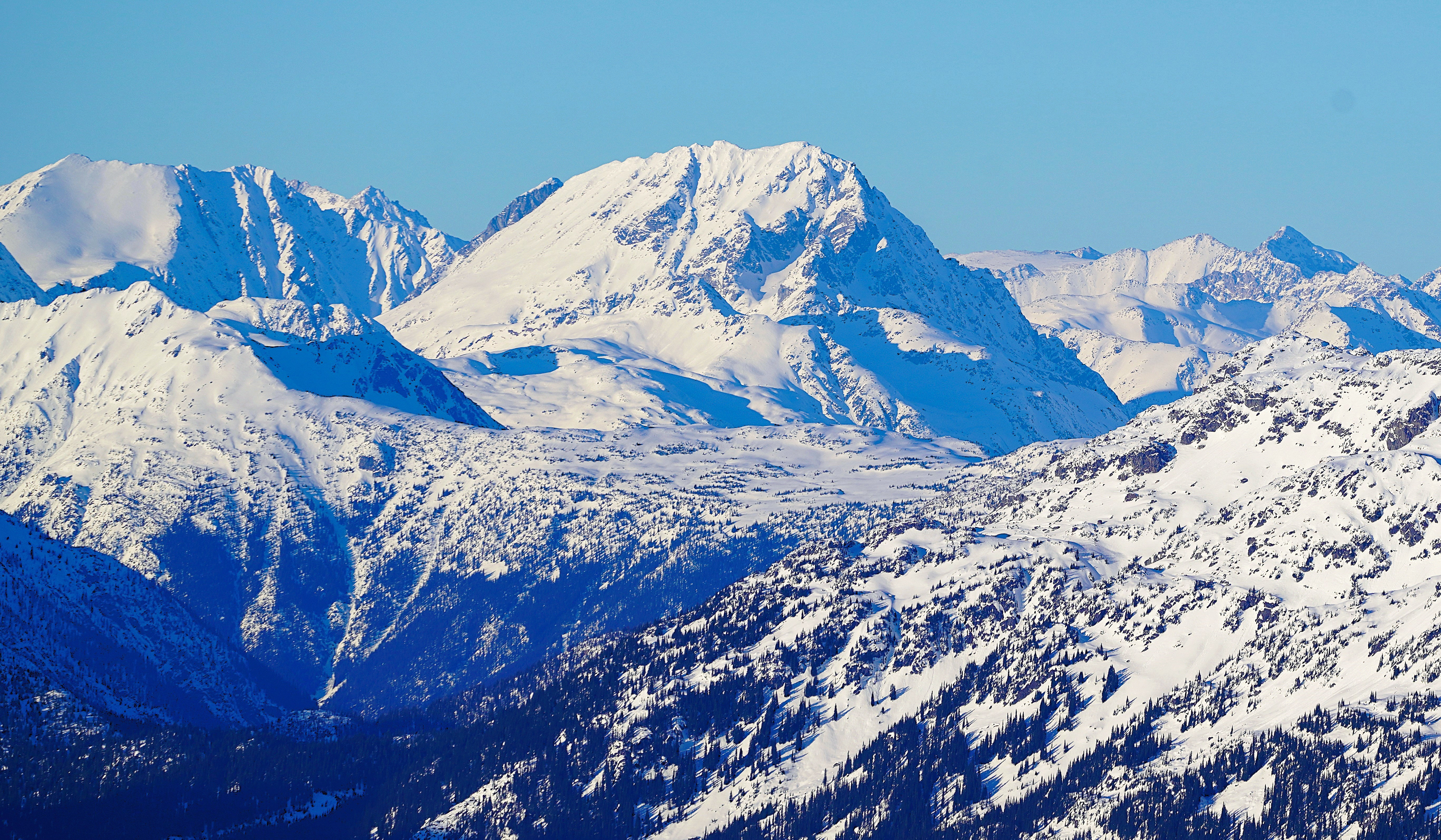
South aspect in winter, viewed from Rainbow Mountain

== See also ==
- Geography of British Columbia
- Geology of British Columbia
