= Randy Stoltmann =

Randy Stoltmann (September 28, 1962 – May 22, 1994) was an outdoorsman, and a campaigner for the preservation of wilderness areas in British Columbia, Canada.

Stoltmann was the author of three books: Hiking Guide to the Big Trees of British Columbia, Written by the Wind, and Hiking the Ancient Forests of British Columbia and Washington.

Stoltmann became an expert on big trees in British Columbia at a young age. He played a key role in the campaign to prevent the logging of the Carmanah Valley on Vancouver Island. This led to the establishment of the Carmanah Walbran Provincial Park in 1990.

In May 1994 Stoltmann was killed in an avalanche while mountaineering in the Kitlope area.

The provincial government honoured Stoltmann after his death by naming the Randy Stoltmann Commemorative Grove in Carmanah Walbran Provincial Park after him. In addition, activists working to preserve the Elaho Valley north of Squamish designated this area as the Stoltmann Wilderness.
