= Mount Sir Richard =

Mountain in British Columbia, Canada

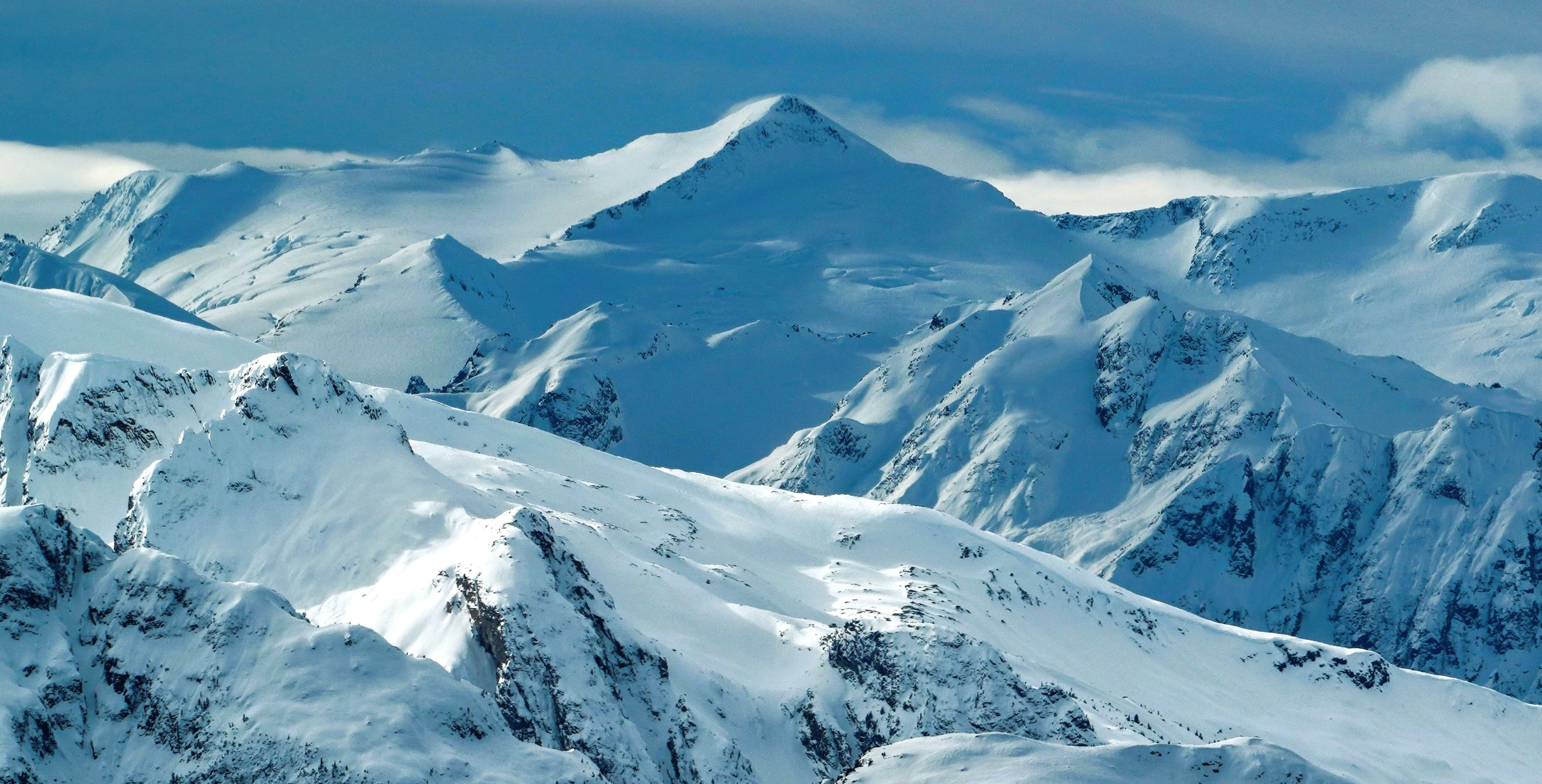
- North aspect centered at top, from Mt. Taylor

Highest point
- Elevation: 2,681 m (8,796 ft)
- Prominence: 886 m (2,907 ft)
- Parent peak: Tremor Mountain
- Isolation: 12.51 km (7.77 mi)
- Listing: Mountains of British Columbia
- Coordinates: 49°57′50″N 122°42′04″W

Naming
- Etymology: Sir Richard McBride

Geography
- Location within British Columbia Location within Canada
- Interactive map of Mount Sir Richard
- Location: British Columbia, Canada
- District: New Westminster Land District
- Protected area: Garibaldi Provincial Park
- Parent range: Coast Mountains; McBride Range
- Topo map: NTS 92G15 Mamquam Mountain

Climbing
- First ascent: 1937

Mount Sir Richard is a 2,681-metre (8,796-foot) glaciated summit in British Columbia, Canada.

== Description ==
Mount Sir Richard is located in the McBride Range of the Coast Mountains, and 25 kilometres (16 mi) southeast of Whistler in Garibaldi Provincial Park. It is the highest point of the McBride Range and seventh-highest peak within the park. Precipitation runoff and glacial meltwater from this mountain's south and east slopes drains to the Lillooet River via Tuwasus Creek, whereas the north and west slopes drain into headwaters of the Cheakamus River. Mount Sir Richard is more notable for its steep rise above local terrain than for its absolute elevation as topographic relief is significant with the summit rising 1,880 metres (6,168 ft) above Tuwasus Creek in less than six kilometres (3.7 mi) and 1,380 metres (4,527 ft) above Cheakamus River in five kilometres (3.1 mi).

== History ==
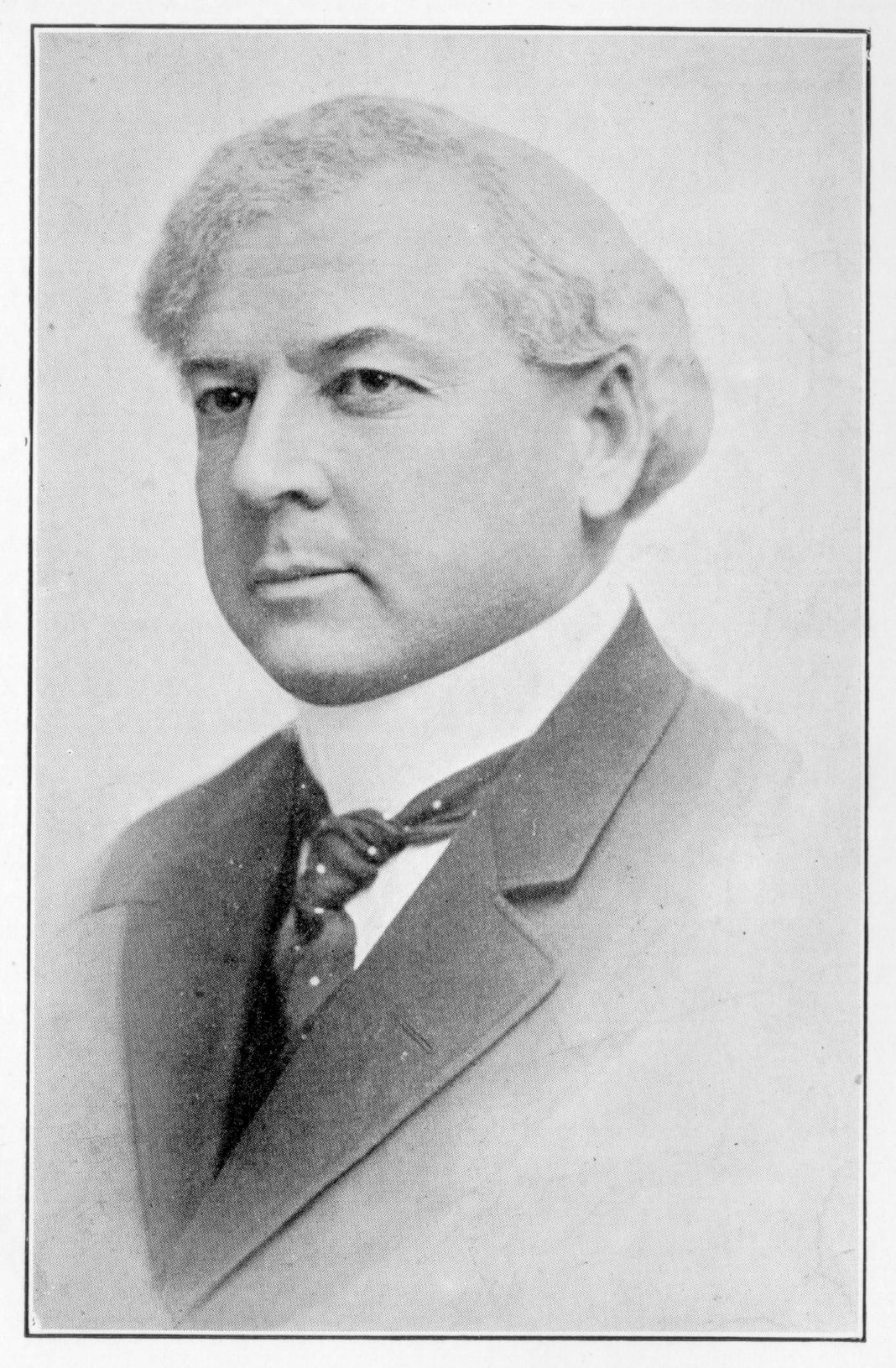
Richard McBride

The mountain's name honors Sir Richard McBride (1870–1917). The toponym was officially adopted September 2, 1930, by the Geographical Names Board of Canada. In 1903, at the age of 33, he became the youngest premier in the history of British Columbia. McBride was knighted in 1912, then resigned as premier in 1915 and became British Columbia's agent-general in London. There is also Mount McBride located on Vancouver Island that is named after him.

The first ascent of the summit was made on May 2, 1937, by Don Munday, Phyllis Munday, and Pip Brock via the Cheakamus River Valley and McBride Glacier. Their adventure took 14 days.

== Climate ==
Based on the Köppen climate classification, Mount Sir Richard is located in the marine west coast climate zone of western North America. Most weather fronts originate in the Pacific Ocean, and travel east toward the Coast Mountains where they are forced upward by the range (orographic lift), causing them to drop their moisture in the form of rain or snowfall. As a result, the Coast Mountains experience high precipitation, especially during the winter months in the form of snowfall. Winter temperatures can drop below −20 °C with wind chill factors below −30 °C. This climate supports the Ubyssey Glacier on the south and west slopes of the peak, as well as the McBride Glacier on the north and east slopes. The months of July and August offer the most favorable weather for climbing Mount Sir Richard.

== See also ==
- Geography of British Columbia
- Geology of British Columbia
