= New Westminster Land District =

Land district in British Columbia, Canada

- Land district
- Interactive map of New Westminster Land District
- Coordinates: 49°44′N 126°05′W
- Country: Canada
- Province: British Columbia
- Created: 1860
- Number of land districts in BC: 59
- Named for: New Westminster

New Westminster Land District is one of 59 land districts of British Columbia, Canada, which are the underlying cadastral divisions of that province, created with rest of those on Mainland British Columbia via the Lands Act of the Colony of British Columbia in 1860. The British Columbia government's BC Names system, a subdivision of GeoBC, defines a land district as "a territorial division with legally defined boundaries for administrative purposes". All land titles and surveys use the Land District system as the primary point of reference, and entries in BC Names for placenames and geographical objects are so listed.

== Description ==
This land district is named for the city of New Westminster, which at the time of its creation was the capital of the Mainland Colony. Greater Vancouver, the Fraser Valley, the Sunshine Coast and the Highway 99 corridor up to and including the Resort Municipality of Whistler, are all within this land district, as well as Savary, Raza, and East and West Redonda Islands. Also included are the settlements of Skookumchuck Hot Springs (Skatin) and Port Douglas on the lower Lillooet River, Long Island, which is a large island in the middle or Harrison Lake, and the Village of Harrison Hot Springs, the western half of the District of Kent, and almost all of City of Chilliwack.

To the north of New Westminster Land District are Range 1 Coast Land District and Lillooet Land District, to its east is Yale Division Yale Land District and for the small portion of its boundary within the Lillooet Ranges, Kamloops Division Yale Land District.

=== Boundary ===
The land district's southern boundary lies along part of the international boundary between BC Canada and the US state of Washington. The western end of the land district's southern boundary meets the centre of the Strait of Georgia where it turns along the midline until it diverges to follow Malaspina Strait, bypasses Texada Island which has its own separate land district, then rejoins the midline of the Strait of Georgia approximately midway between Comox and Powell River to a point south of Hernando Island, then traversing the mouth of Desolation Sound following Calm Channel between Cortes Island to the west and West Redonda and Raza Islands to Pryce Channel, then following that channel and Homfray Channel to 51 degree 14 minutes north, from whence it proceeds eastward, other than two small variances around certain land parcels in the area of Homfray Channel and the Soo River, to the summit of the Garibaldi Ranges just south of Mount Currie to a point southwest of In-SHUCK-ch Mountain (Gunsight Peak), then eastward via roughly 50 degrees 7 minutes north latitude to the divide of the Lillooet Ranges, following that for a short distance, then south via an irregular line to Harrison Lake, meeting that lake's shoreline northwest of the mouth of Big Silver Creek (aka Big Silver River) and following the lake south so as to include Long Island but exclude Echo Island.

Upon reaching the foot of Harrison Lake, the boundary of the land district proceeds southward so as to include the Village of Harrison Hot Springs and to bisect the District of Kent, excluding the town of Agassiz, roughly along 121 degree 17 minutes west longitude, to a point east of Rosedale to roughly 49 degrees 11 minutes north latitude, west a short distance to 121 degrees 47 minutes 38 seconds west longitude to roughly 49 degrees 10 minutes 32 seconds north latitude, east along that line which corresponds to Nevin Road to 121 degrees 9 minutes 7 second west and following that line south to 49 degrees 9 minutes 40 seconds north latitude, where it goes a short distance west to roughly 121 degrees 47 minutes 25 seconds west longitude, then south along that line to meet the eastern end of the land district boundary that lies along part of the international boundary.

== Political geography ==
The Land District corresponds to the original Westminster riding for the British Columbia Legislature.

== See also ==
- List of Land Districts of British Columbia
