= Malibu Princess =

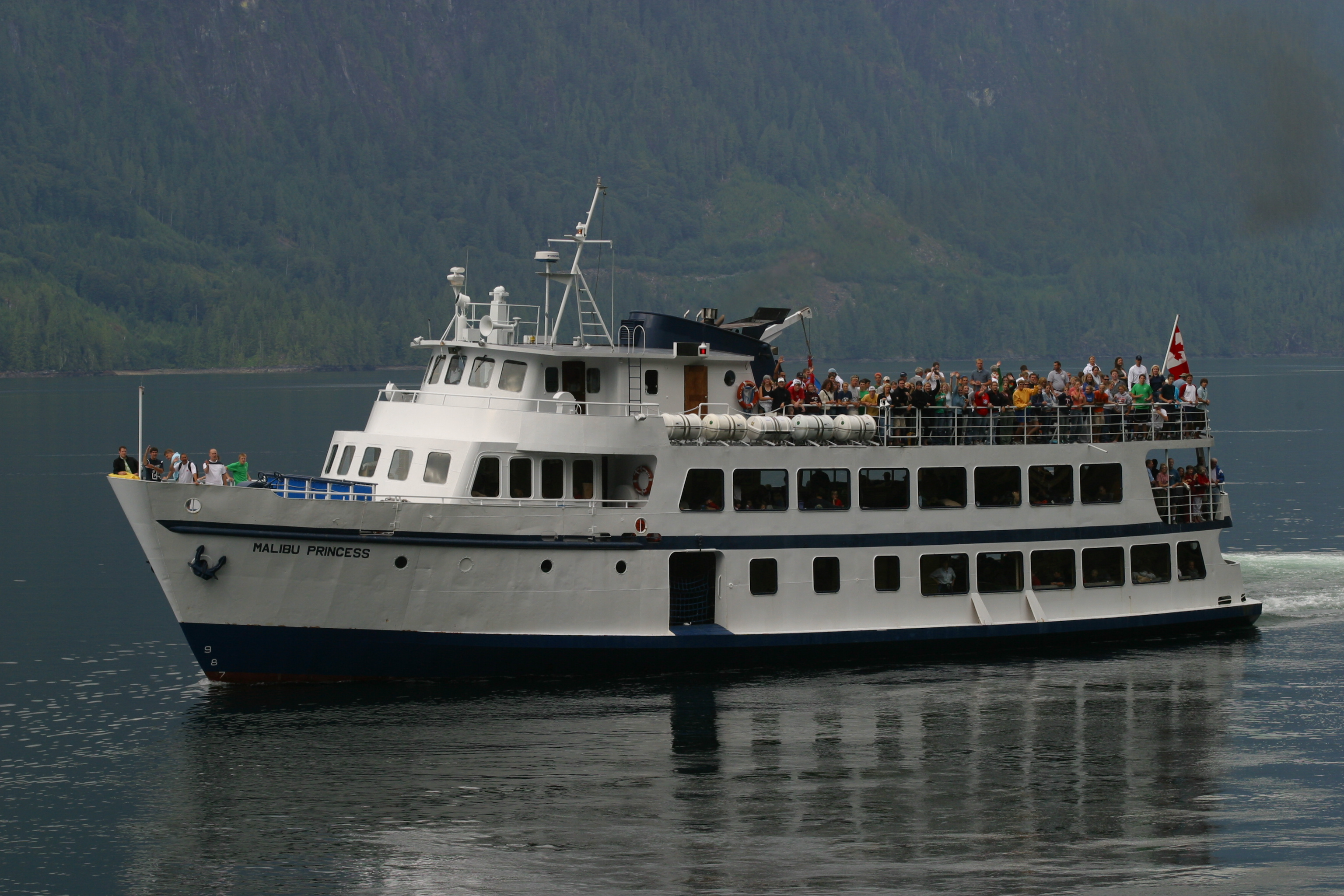
- Malibu Princess

History
- Name: Malibu Princess
- Owner: Young Life
- Operator: Malibu Yacht Charters
- Port of registry: Canada
- Route: Jervis Inlet, British Columbia
- Builder: Allied Shipbuilders, False Creek, Vancouver, Canada
- Cost: $335,000
- Launched: March 26, 1966
- Christened: March 26, 1966
- Completed: April 1966
- Identification: IMO number: 6611215; MMSI number: 316004344; Callsign: VYPM
- Status: Active
- Notes: Specifications from Transport Canada,vessel registration query - Malibu Princess

General characteristics
- Type: Passenger-Excursion
- Tonnage: 505 tons
- Length: 126 ft (38 m)
- Beam: 32.6 ft (9.9 m)
- Draft: 7.6 ft (2.3 m)
- Depth: 2.74 m (9.0 ft)
- Decks: 3
- Installed power: Two Deutz Diesels Engines with total of 850 hp (0.63 MW)
- Propulsion: Twin Screw
- Speed: 12 knots at full load
- Capacity: 325
- Crew: 7

Malibu Princess is a passenger vessel privately owned by Young Life and which operates the Malibu Club in Canada located at Malibu, British Columbia, adjacent to the narrow entrance of Princess Louisa Inlet. The ship is used specifically to transport people and freight to Malibu.

== History ==
During those early years, Young Life was reliant on charter freight boats to transport their young passengers from Vancouver to Malibu. By 1965, Young Life was faced with a challenge when their stable chartered freight hauler would no longer be in business.

A suitable vessel would need to be designed and built per Young Life's needs and a letter of intent was issued. Once approved, Philip F. Spaulding and Associates of Seattle was selected to design the vessel and the False Creek shipyard selected was Allied Shipbuilders who would build the ship. The name of the ship would be called the Malibu Princess after a large yacht Young Life sold to help finance it which would be renamed the Weatherly.

- The design of the Malibu Princess was a shorter version of the Coho of the Black Ball Line.

The overall cost of the ship was $335,000 with $135,000 coming from the Canadian Maritime Commission Ship Subsidy and from the proceeds from the sale of the soon-to-be Weatherly. The remaining funds were through a loan that Mr. C.D. Weyerhaeuser was able to secure. Eventually, the boat was paid off through fund raising and major donations.

- The ship was launched on March 26, 1966 on Saturday morning at nine in the morning.

When she was launched, the Malibu Princess was based out of, the North Vancouver waterfront, around the site of the current SeaBus Terminal, at the foot of Chesterfield Ave., then from 1972, she used a pier, just West from the old Pier B-C, which is now the location of Canada Place and the thriving cruise ship facility of Vancouver. The Princess would make its 16+ hour round trip from Vancouver to Malibu, taking campers and supplies to The Bu then returning with finished campers, this trip was done once a week. But in 1997, the Princess was moved to her new berth at Egmont which helped cut down the travel time by more than 60%, thereby reducing the overall wear & tear on the ship plus reduced significantly the fuel costs. Campers heading to The Bu are now brought to Egmont on charter bus, along the scenic Sunshine Coast highway, via B.C. Ferries Horseshoe Bay to Langdale Terminal.

- The Malibu Princess is available for private charters or tours to Princess Louisa Inlet through Malibu Yacht Charters in Egmont.

== Gallery ==
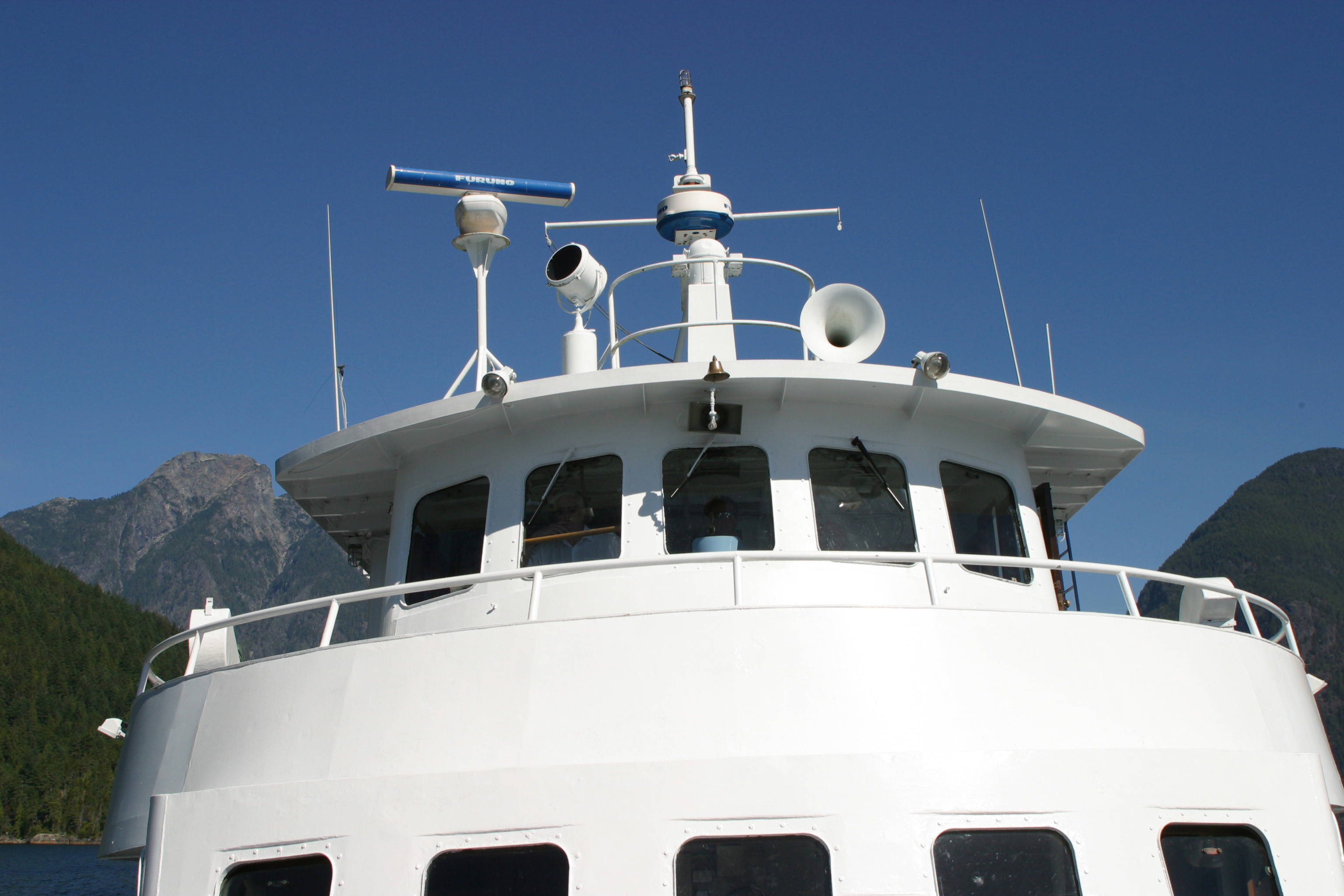

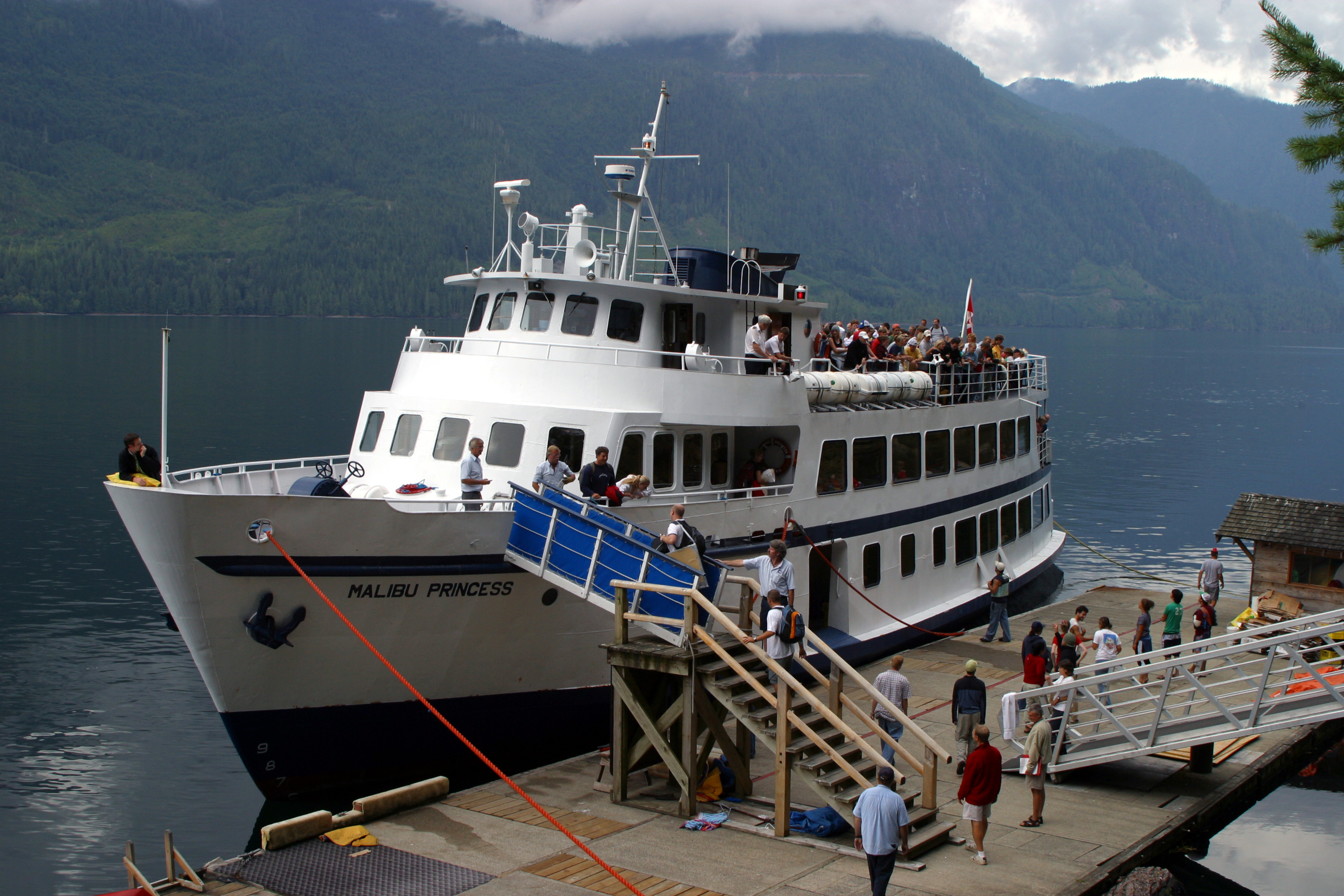

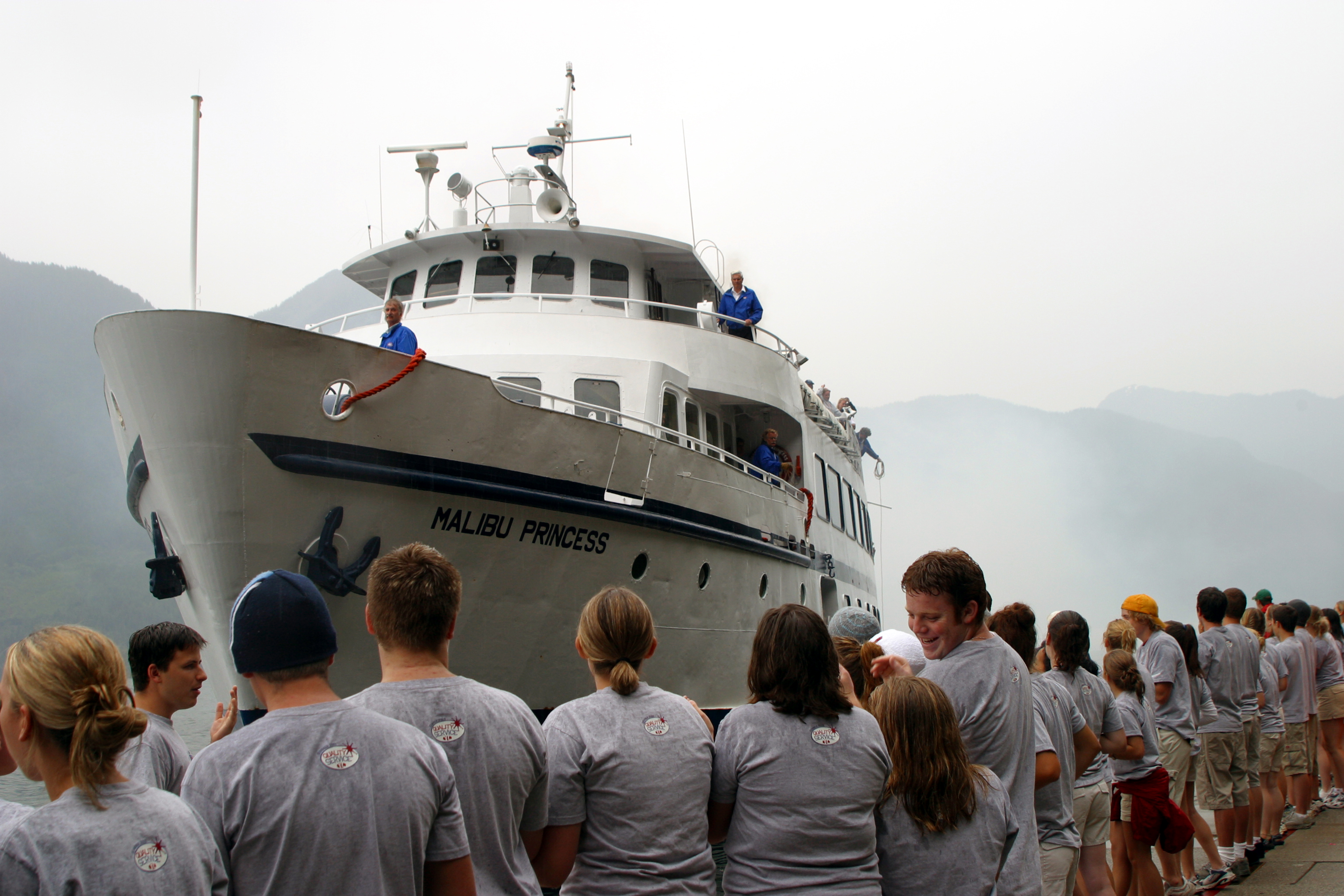

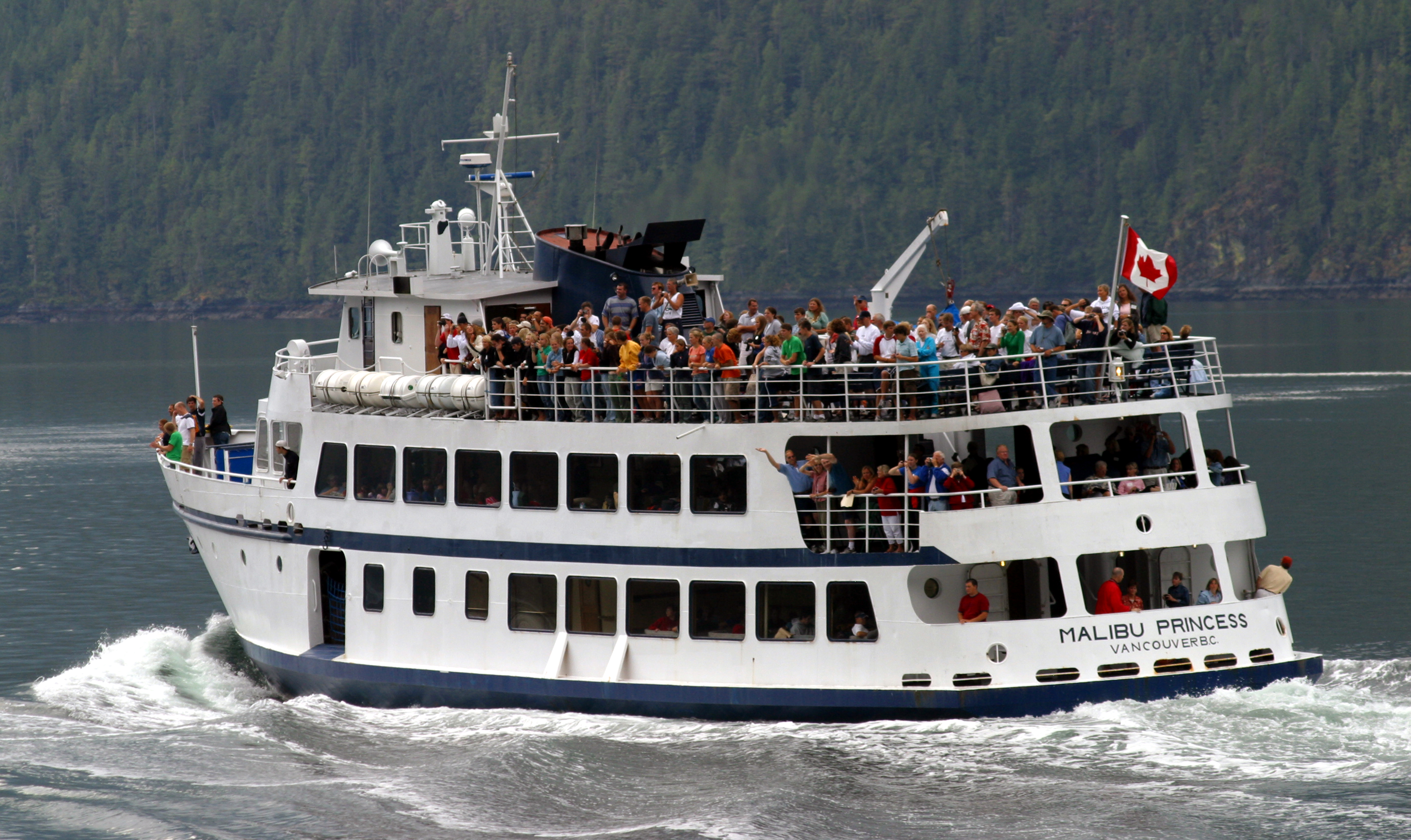

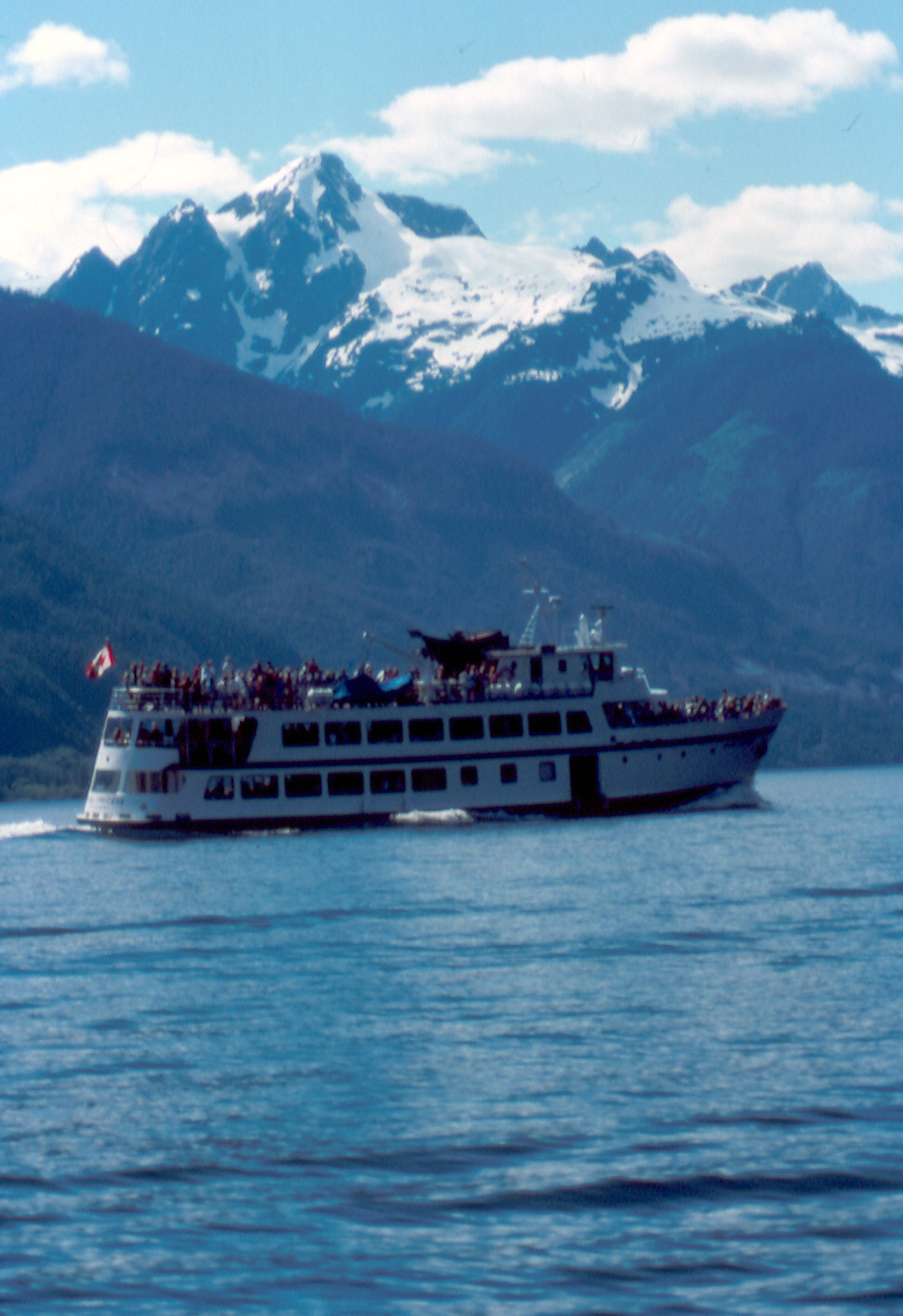
