= Forbidden Island =

Forbidden Island or Forbidden Isle may refer to:

== Arts and entertainment ==
- Forbidden Island (album), 1958 album by Martin Denny
- Forbidden Island (film), 1959 American film directed by Charles B. Griffith starring Jon Hall
- Forbidden Island (game), a board game published by Gamewright Games in 2010
- Forbidden Island (TV series), a 1999 American TV series

== Islands ==
- Forbidden Island, Saipan, Northern Mariana Islands, United States
- Kharg Island, Iran, often referred to as "the Forbidden Island"
- Niihau, the westernmost island in Hawaii, United States, nicknamed "the Forbidden Isle"
- Malibu Islet, at the entrance of Princess Louisa Inlet, in British Columbia, Canada, also known as Forbidden Island
