= MV Malibu =

Seafaring vessel

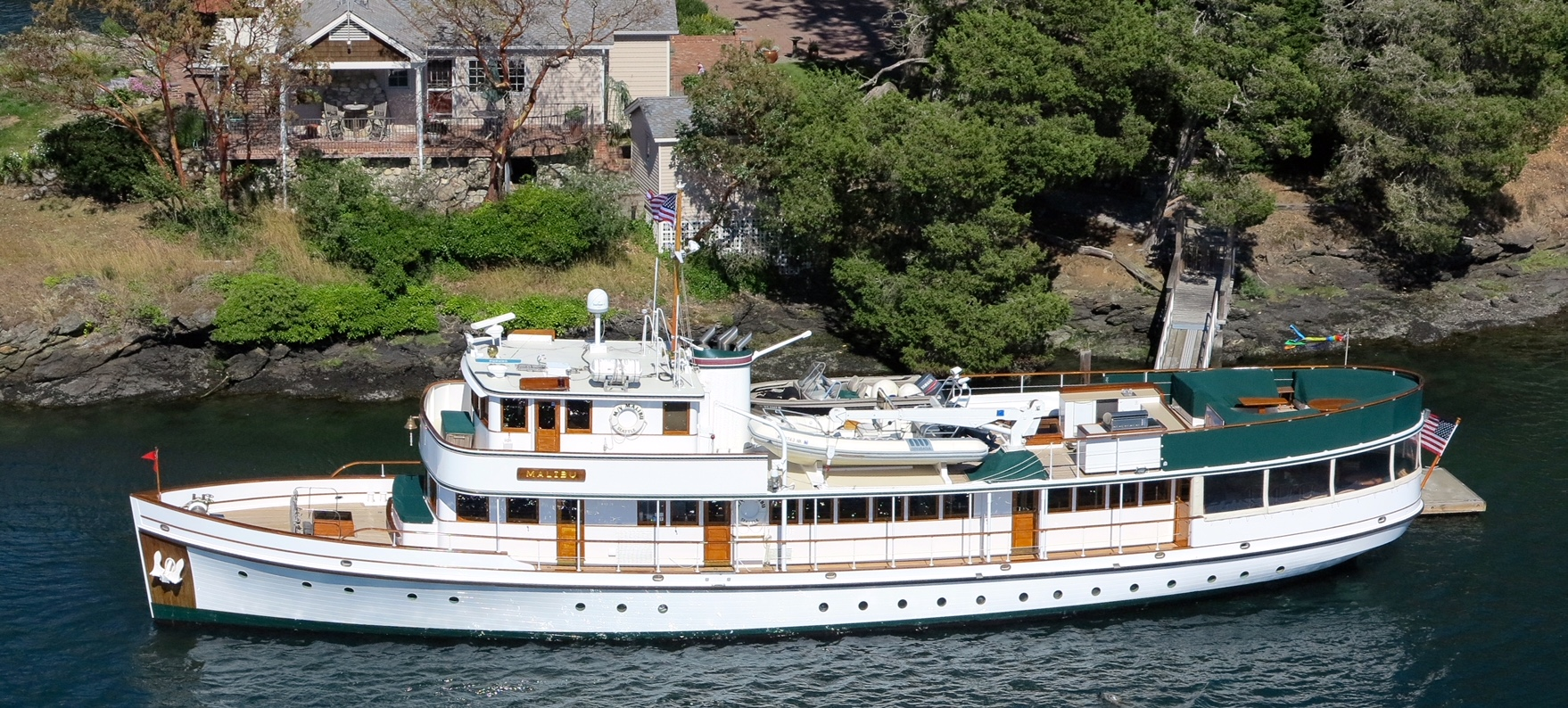
- Yacht Malibu in 2016

History
- Name: Malibu
- Owner: J. Jacobi
- Port of registry: U.S.
- Route: Pacific Northwest
- Builder: N. J. Blanchard Boat Co.
- Cost: $100,000
- Launched: May 28, 1926
- Identification: Official Number: 225799

General characteristics
- Tonnage: 142 GT
- Length: 100 ft (30 m) on deck
- Beam: 20 ft (6.1 m)
- Draft: 7.5 ft (2.3 m)
- Depth: 10.2 ft (3.1 m)
- Installed power: 600 hp (450 kW) Cummins diesel engines
- Propulsion: Twin screw
- Speed: 10 knots (19 km/h; 12 mph) cruise
- Notes: Wood hull

Seattle Landmark
- Designated: April 6, 1999

MV Malibu is a 100-foot (30 m) motor yacht built in 1926. She was designed by Ted Geary and built by N. J. Blanchard Boat Co., Seattle, Washington.

Construction is of Douglas Fir sawn frames on 16 in (410 mm) centers, planked with 2.5 in (64 mm) Port Orford yellow cedar.

Malibu's original 4-cylinder Washington Estep diesel engines have been replaced twice, now with Cummins diesel engines, cruising at 10 knots (19 km/h; 12 mph) with a range of over 2,000 miles (3,200 km).

== History ==
Malibu was originally built for the Adamson and Rindge families of Malibu, California. Rhoda May Knight Rindge and daughter Rhoda Adamson commissioned the yacht in 1925 and owned her until 1937.

Her third owner, Thomas F. Hamilton developed a resort in British Columbia, Canada, named 'Malibu Camp' (Malibu, British Columbia). The camp is now owned and operated by Young Life. The 'Malibu Rapids' navigation channel at the entrance to Princess Louisa Inlet, near Malibu Camp, is also named after the yacht.

Malibu was purchased by Wells McCurdy in 1973 and reconfigured with raised wheelhouse and other arrangement changes.

On July 3, 2002, Malibu sank after running into a rock in the San Juan Islands of Washington State. There were no injuries, but the yacht had to be extensively rebuilt and was re-launched at Seattle's Foss Shipyard in 2003.

Currently owned by John Jacobi of Seattle, Washington, who has owned her since 1999. Malibu is also designated as a City of Seattle Historic Landmark.
