= Mount Helena =

Mount Helena may refer to:

- Mount Helena, Western Australia, a suburb of Perth.
- Mount Helena (British Columbia), a mountain in British Columbia.
- Mount Helena City Park, a mountain and city park in Helena, Montana.
