= Malibu Islet =

Islet in British Columbia, Canada

Nickname: Forbidden Island
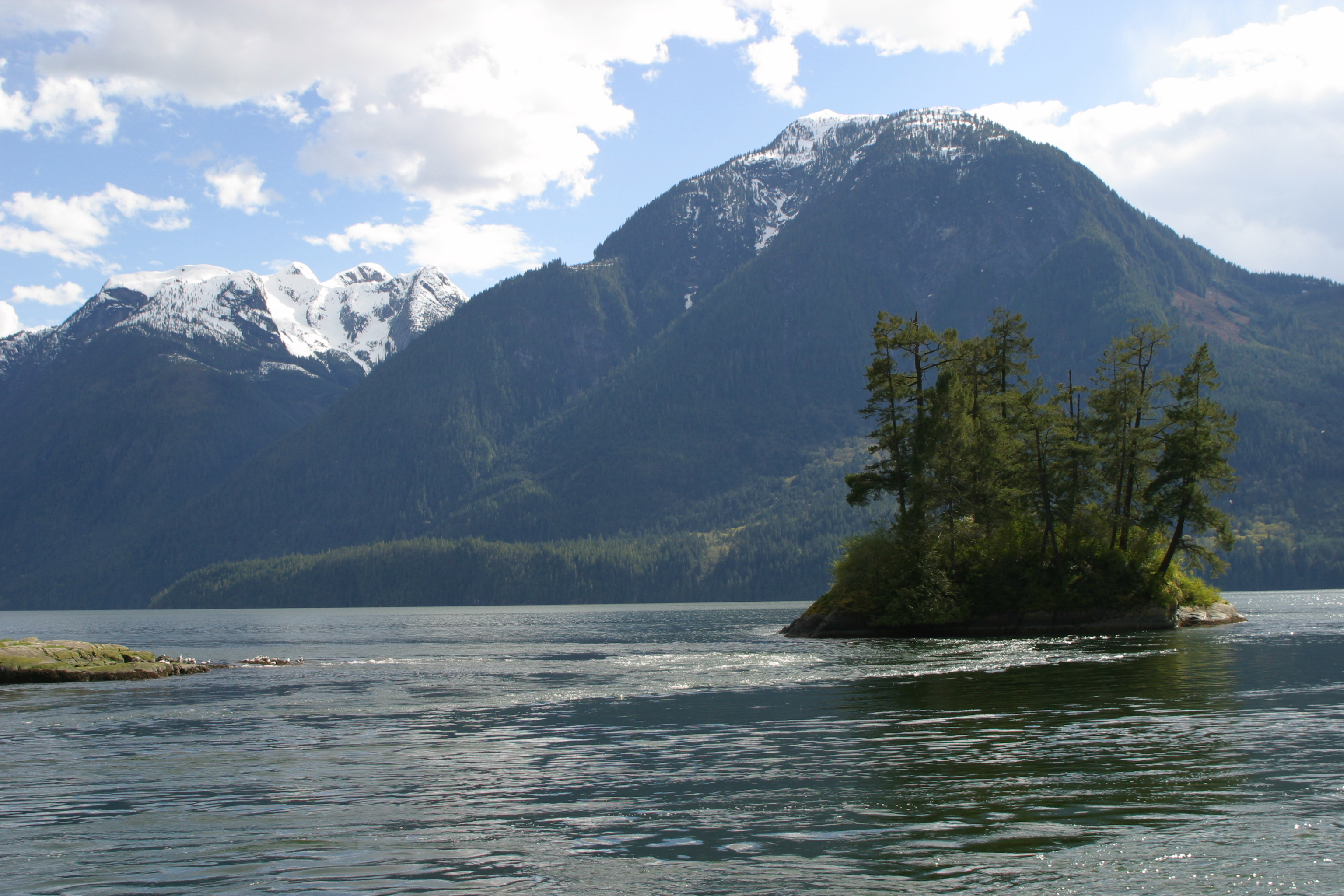
- Mt. Arthur with Forbidden Island in the foreground, Jervis Inlet and Princess Louisa Inlet, BC/Canada
- Interactive map of Malibu Islet

Geography
- Coordinates: 50°9′46.26″N 123°51′5.30″W

Administration
- Canada

Location of Malibu Isle in British Columbia

Malibu Islet, also known as Malibu Isle or Forbidden Island, is located at the entrance of Princess Louisa Inlet, south of Malibu Rapids, east of Queens Reach, a stretch of Jervis Inlet in the New Westminster Land District, British Columbia, Canada. The island is the part of the narrow passage that joins Princess Louisa Inlet and Jervis Inlet together. The navigational entrance to Princess Louisa Inlet for all marine traffic is between the island and a navigation buoy.

The island is part of the Shishalh people's traditional territory, referenced as Malibu Isle on all nautical charts and topographic maps. Traditionally, the Sechelts would bury their dead in the caves and island surrounding these inlets and bays of the Sunshine Coast. It is for this reason, that Young Life's Malibu Club has referred to this island as Forbidden Island since it is forbidden to be on the island for any reason out of respect for the native tradition.
