= Chatterbox Falls =

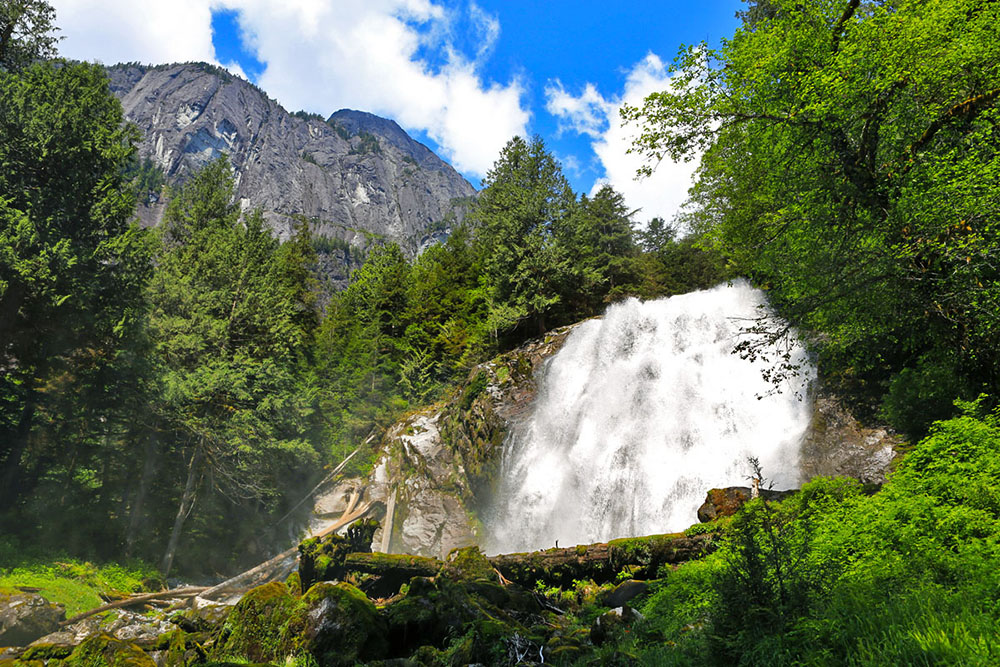
- Chatterbox Falls, Princess Louisa Inlet
- Interactive map of Chatterbox Falls
- Location: Mouth of Losquilts Creek at head of Princess Louisa Inlet, NE end of Jervis Inlet, New Westminster Land District
- Coordinates: 50°12′22″N 123°46′14″W
- Type: Fan
- Total height: 120 feet (37 m)
- Watercourse: Loquilts Creek

Chatterbox Falls is a waterfall in British Columbia, Canada, located at the head or end of Princess Louisa Inlet. It is part of Loquilts River which empties into the inlet. The falls are a popular destination for boaters around the world and are in Princess Louisa Marine Provincial Park, part of BC Parks' marine park system which manages the area with the cooperation of the Princess Louisa International Society.

Just upstream from Chatterbox Falls lies the 2,755-foot (840 m) James Bruce Falls, which is the tallest waterfall in North America.

== Gallery ==
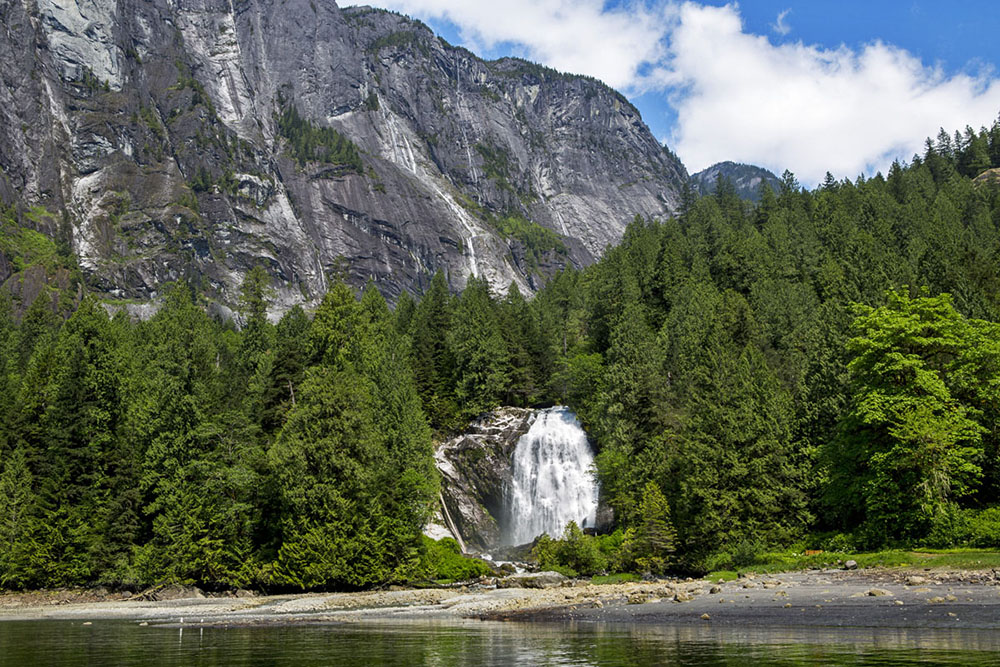
Chatterbox Falls from distance

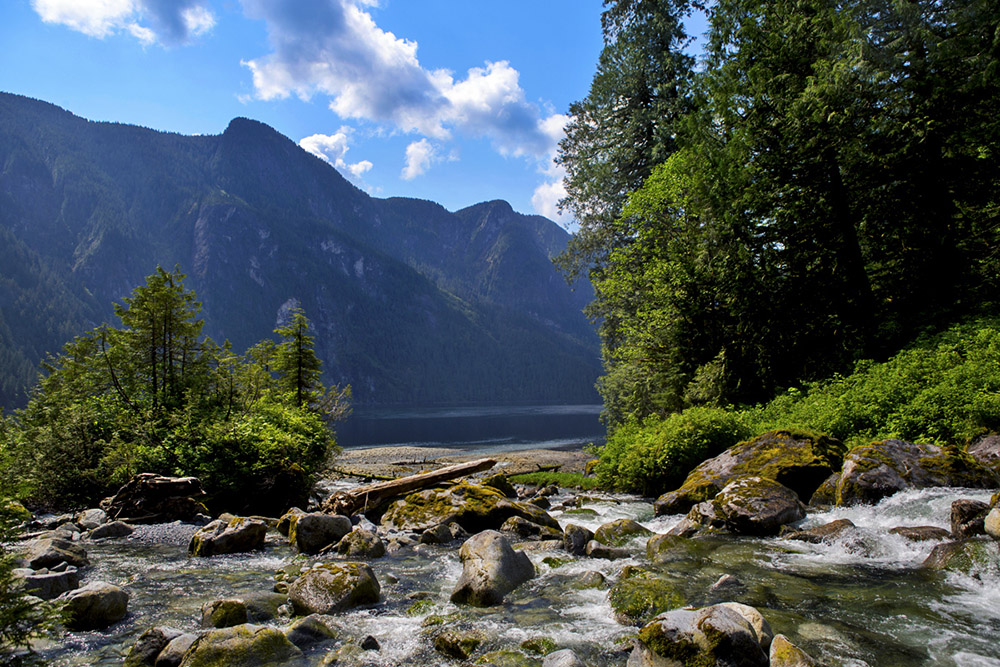
Stream from Chatterbox Falls

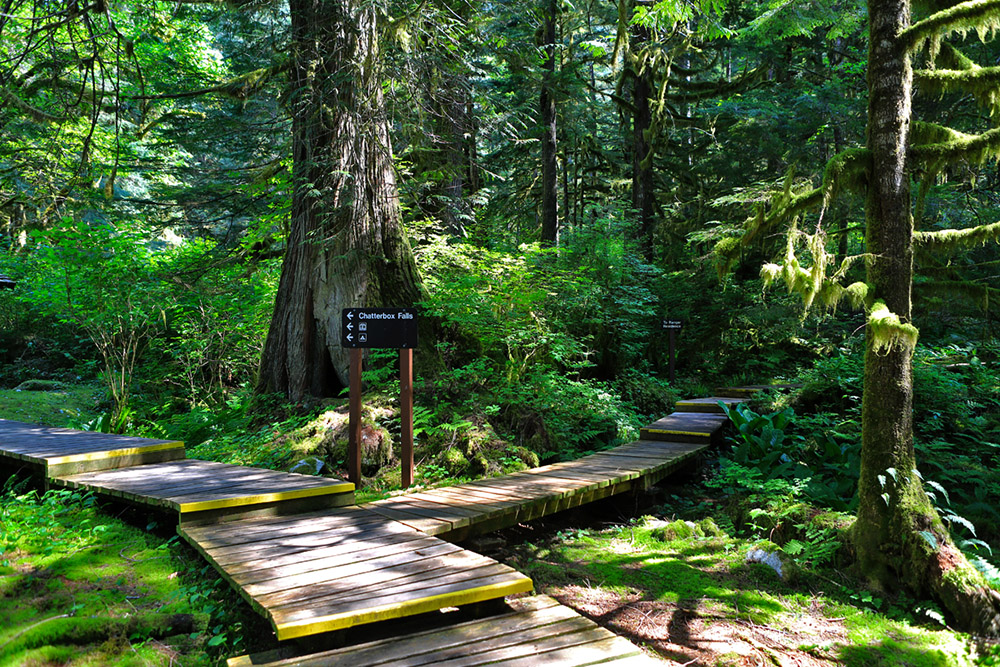
Path to the falls

== See also ==
- List of waterfalls
- List of waterfalls of Canada
- List of waterfalls in British Columbia
