= Thomas F. Hamilton =

American aviator and founder of the Hamilton Standard Company

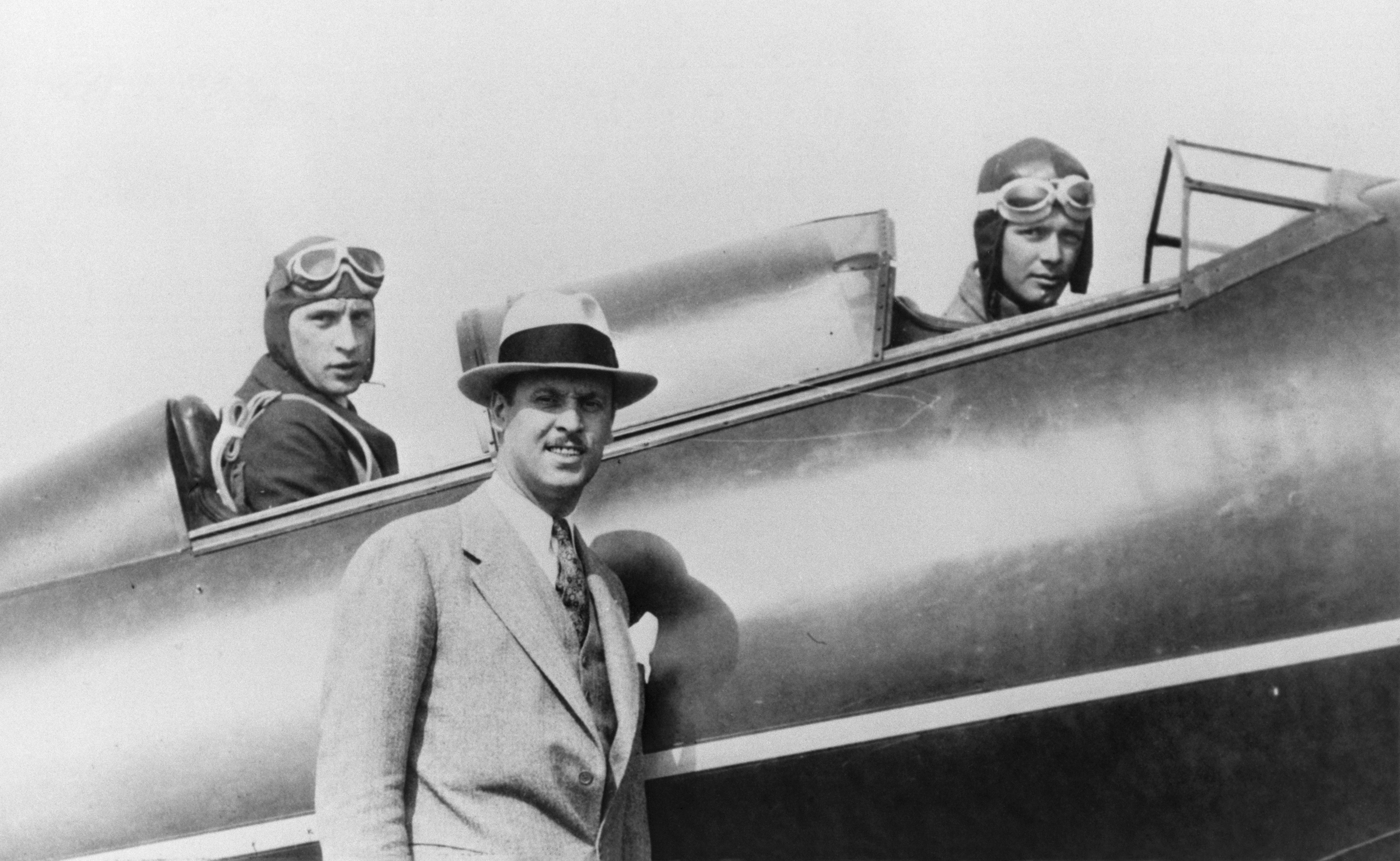
- Hamilton in front of Weick and Lindbergh
- Born: Thomas Foster Hamilton; July 28, 1894; Seattle, Washington, US
- Died: August 12, 1969 (aged 75); Good Samaritan Hospital, Los Angeles, California, US
- Resting place: Forrest Lawn Memorial Park, California, US
- Occupation: Aviation Executive
- Known for: Founder of the Hamilton Standard company, propellers, and early aircraft. Builder of the Malibu Resort at Princess Louisa Inlet
- Spouse(s): Ethal Inez Hughes (1st wife) & Lenora Hamilton (2nd wife)
- Children: 4

Thomas Foster Hamilton (July 28, 1894 – August 12, 1969) was a pioneering American aviator and the founder of the Hamilton Standard Company.

Since 1930, Hamilton Standard (now Hamilton Sundstrand) was involved with revolutionizing the propulsion technology of propeller-driven aircraft, prior to World War II. The introduction of Frank Caldwell's variable-pitch propeller made Hamilton Standard one of the leading aerospace companies of today. Hamilton contributed a great deal in shaping the aviation industry into what it is today. Hamilton worked hard from an early age to understand technical concepts and their application to aircraft design and manufacturing. He was also a skilled businessman and marketer, known in social and political settings, and a devoted family man.

== Life ==
Hamilton was born on July 28, 1894. He spent most of his childhood in Seattle. He was the older of two boys (his brother, Edgar Charles Hamilton, born later) to his parents (Thomas Luther and Henrietta Hamilton). Hamilton's early interests in aviation began when he was around 10 years old. His mother had taken a trip to see the 1904 St. Louis Exposition, where there was a display of gliders organized by Octave Chanute and, somehow on her return, Hamilton became more focused on aeronautics. Mrs. Hamilton may have made a connection with Chanute at the fair since the young Tom Hamilton did not make the long trip with her. Some years later, Hamilton indicated that he often wrote to Chanute concerning technical matters related to his early aircraft, though no record has been found mentioning Hamilton in Chanute's letter collection currently located at the Library of Congress thus far.

During the 1909 Alaska–Yukon–Pacific Exposition, held in Seattle (held on the site of the present-day University of Washington), the young Hamilton, now at the age of 14, had a job of repairing hot-air balloons. This job would also allow him to ride what he repaired (possibly a type of insurance policy to ensure the balloons were fixed properly) which helped fuel his continuing interest in aviation. Also, during this time, Hamilton and a school friend, Paul J. Palmer established a partnership and called their company “Hamilton and Palmer”. Their office and factory were located in their respective parents' garage and kitchen tables. The two built and experimented with various biplane glider designs of the time. The two quickly gained a better understanding of the principles of how aircraft worked and were put together. Three gliders were actually built and flown around the steep hills around their neighborhood in Seattle called Leschi which was on the west shores of Lake Washington. There was only one mishap. The second glider jerked out of the hands of Palmer and soared away and crashing into pieces blocks away. Many years later, Hamilton would recall that even though he got a scar on his left hand from one of the flights, he had learned how to fly from those tests.

In 1910, after finishing their experiments with the gliders they moved on to building propeller-driven aircraft. At this point, there was a disagreement between Palmer and Hamilton, and the former was no longer involved with the company and was totally removed from the partnership. It seems this split was so severe that Hamilton changed the name of the company to the “Hamilton Aero Manufacturing Co”.

=== Early aircraft designs ===
In 1911, Hamilton teamed up with Ted Geary, a young yacht designer, to create a number of unique seaplane designs that were seen around Seattle's Lake Washington and various aerial demonstrations of the day. The total number of known aircraft built by Hamilton's Seattle company is estimated to be around 10 to 25 aircraft, though a more accurate account of his aircraft built during the 1909 to 1914 period is yet unknown. His designs were a combination of other designs of the era and his own unique ideas incorporated into the aircraft. Even at an early age, he was able to comprehend and build complicated flying machines. Although he dropped out of high school and did not have any formal education after that, he was able to manufacture and sell these aircraft all before he was 16 years old. This was done prior to William Boeing taking his first flight and setting up his operation in Seattle, which is the Boeing Company of today. Incidentally, Hamilton and Boeing became friends during this time and their friendship lasted throughout the years both professionally and personally. It was recorded that in 1914, Hamilton introduced Bill Boeing to Conrad Westervelt (a young Navy lieutenant commander) at a club in Seattle that was the start of the Boeing Company.

Also in 1914, a number of wealthy businessmen from Vancouver, British Columbia, approached Hamilton. They were looking for someone to build airplanes for the non-profit, private BC Aviation School Ltd. that would teach their Canadian sons to fly in the Great War being fought over in Europe. Hamilton accepted the invitation and immediately moved his whole operation up to Vancouver and established the Hamilton Aero Manufacturing Ltd. The contract was to build four planes to be used in training purposes for the school. However, only one airplane was ever completed. It was a biplane patterned after a Curtiss tractor design, with two seats, a six-cylinder engine, and a tricycle landing gear. Unfortunately, the aircraft was not successful because it crashed in a muddy field outside of Vancouver. Out of the 12 students, two were able to graduate and went on to fight in the war with the RFC (Royal Flying Corps – the precursor to the RAF). The rest were integrated into other aviation training programs and transferred to the war effort later. In the meantime, Hamilton had become very interested in the physics of propellers and had started making inquires about his possible involvement in the war effort for the United States. This was around 1917; at this point, the U.S. just entered the war and needed experienced people to help the country establish an aviation industry in support of the war overseas in Europe.

=== Military interest ===
The US military was very interested in Hamilton's background and requested that he come out east. The military leaders at the time wanted to keep most of their aviation resources closer to Washington D.C., and not in the remote Pacific Northwest. A Milwaukee woodworking firm, the Matthews Brothers Furniture Company, needed an experienced person to run their new aviation division since a large military contract was signed to produce wood propellers for the Navy and Army. Hamilton became their director of aviation in 1918. However, once the war ended Hamilton bought their entire inventory of wood propellers and again started his own company called the Hamilton Aero Manufacturing Company in Milwaukee. Around this time, Hamilton met and married Ethel Inez Hughes, from Milwaukee. The Hamiltons spent ten years in Milwaukee, where it was established as one of the nation's major aviation hubs in the 1920s.

=== Propeller manufacturing ===
Propellers were the first item to be manufactured by the new Hamilton Manufacturing Company, in Milwaukee. The limitations of using wood as a material for aircraft propellers were well known. Metal propellers can be thinner, more closely approximating the ideal airfoil sections needed for maximizing efficiency, while not being affected by the problems caused by moisture and vibrations, which can cause wood propellers to delaminate.

=== Float manufacturing ===
Pontoons were the second product to be manufactured by the company. Again, wood was also used in the construction and even preservatives to protect them, prolonged exposure to water caused the wood to deteriorate quickly.

Despite the clear advantages, there was initially a strong resistance to using materials that rusted easily but this changed with the widespread introduction of a new aluminum alloy developed at Zeppelin. Duralumin may have been the greatest metallurgical advance of its time and allowed aluminum to be used for structural members for the first time, normally being too soft in its pure form, while still being lighter than steel and very resistant to the types of corrosion that would compromise the strength of iron and steel alloys.

=== All-metal aircraft ===
Following World War I, the German Junkers Flugzeug-und Motorenwerke company was the first to manufacture all-metal, monoplane transport aircraft, the Junkers F.13. This was a development of their wartime all-metal corrugated-skin aircraft. In turn, having seen examples that had been imported by Junkers-Larsen, Stout copied Junkers's construction methods but failed to see much success until his company was bought by the Ford Motor Corporation, where he developed the similar Ford Tri-motor, affectionately called the “Tin Goose”. Like the Junkers aircraft, it too had a cantilevered monoplane wing and corrugated metal skin over a metal framework and was built to haul mail and passengers. In response, Hamilton and some shareholders in the Milwaukee community also decided to build an aircraft out of metal, which resulted in a new company called the Hamilton Metalplane Company being formed to do just that.

=== Hamilton Metalplane H-18 ===
The first aircraft built by this company was the Metalplane H-18, christened the “Maiden Milwaukee” in 1927. Its design came from the chief designer of the Metalplane Company of the time – James McDonnell. McDonnell had worked for Stout and Ford and incorporated similar features and new ideas into the construction of the H-18. It used a tubular frame with corrugated skin, a thick monoplane wing projecting from the fuselage beneath an open cockpit, with a 200 hp (150 kW) Wright J-4 Radial engine in the nose, and using a Hamilton (metal) propeller. The “Maiden Milwaukee” was the first aircraft produced by the Hamilton Metalplane Company and it achieved a number of awards. It first came in second during the Ford Air Tour of 1927 and it won the Spokane Air Race of the same year. It was also the first all-metal airplane to achieve certification in the United States. It was designed primarily to haul the mail, with passengers as a possible revenue bonus for the airlines. The design reflects this priority, as the wing root was in the middle of the fuselage and hardly any passengers could fit.

=== Hamilton Metalplane H-18 Helicopter Experiment ===
One of the interesting concepts, was when the designers took the H-18 and fitted two large downward facing propellers (i.e. on under each wing at midpoint) driven by a small engine mounted in the fuselage. It was claimed that this conversion resulted in an aircraft that could take off in a very short distance. Very little else is known about the conversion of an H.18 to this mode.

=== Hamilton Metalplane H-45 and H-47 ===
The aircraft was redesigned and these modifications were introduced in the sequential new models of the Metalplane called the H-45 and H-47. The aircraft now could accommodate passengers and mail. To do this, they had to specifically change the aircraft such as: moving the wing above the fuselage so six seats could be added; enclosing the cockpit and adding windows and leather padding the interior of the aircraft for the passengers' comfort. Offering different types of radial engines that could be incorporated per the customers' request (both Wright and Pratt & Whitney) and different types of landing gear that could be fitted too (such as skis, wheels, and pontoons). Since most of the Hamilton Metalplanes used most of the products generated from the other Hamilton factory it was a cheaper than the Ford Tri-Motor. The Hamilton Metalplane was definitely a plane of its time, for it was the era when airlines were being developed with cargo/mail-in mind instead of passengers. Both the Hamilton Metalplane and the Ford tri-motors started to change this trend. Northwest Airlines started by purchasing a number of Hamiltons to be used in their first passenger run throughout their routes in the Northwest. Ralph Sexton bought a number of Hamiltons to be used for his Panamanian airline called Isthmian Airways. A few went to Alaska and Canada for use in the Arctic. As with Hamilton's earlier aircraft in Seattle, it is not known the exact figure of how many Hamiltons were built but it is estimated to be between 27 and 40 aircraft. Unfortunately, the Hamilton Metalplanes were not as successful as the Ford Tri-Motors. Ford was successful at its marketing strategy of stating it is safer to fly on three engines than on one. For this reason, the Hamilton Metal plane struggled in the market, for it was a good airplane developed ahead of its time.

=== Consolidation ===
In 1929, a holding company called the United Aircraft and Transport Company incorporated a number of aviation companies under one control. This resulted in the Metalplane Company becoming part of Boeing as a separate division for a short time. Eventually, it was absorbed into the Boeing Company with all its patents and other assets becoming a part of the Boeing enterprise. It has been suggested that Boeing may have used these items from the Hamilton Metalplane Company in the development of their Boeing 247 (Boeing's first all-metal monoplane).

In the meantime, Hamilton became president of United Airports (a division of UA&T) and was in charge of building the new Burbank Airport in California. He also moved some of his propeller operations out west and established a propeller factory at the Burbank site. Hamilton's entire family moved to Beverly Hills and eventually built a house out at Lake Arrowhead, California, where he established a permanent residence. Meanwhile, the UA&T Company decided to merge the Hamilton Aero Manufacturing Company with the Pittsburgh propeller firm Standard Steel Propeller Company and the entire Milwaukee operation was moved to that location. Both Hamilton and the owner of Standard Steel had been intense business rivals. According to Eugene Wilson (who took over the propeller operation for UA&T) the Standard Steel Company had the patent rights to the Reed propeller design and there was concern about a lawsuit. As a compromise, it was decided to move the propeller operation to Pittsburgh and combined the names of the companies to be called the Hamilton Standard Company. A year later, the propeller operation moved again to Connecticut and has been there since. Incidentally, Hamilton did not receive the news of the merger right away, which was a little unsettling to him. As a compromise, Hamilton agreed to the merger only if his name took precedence in the new trademark and was called Hamilton Standard.

=== Build-up to war ===
After the Burbank Airport opened with big fanfare in 1930, Hamilton then became a foreign representative for the United Aircraft Export Company in Europe of which he would become a leading individual for the survival of several aviation companies. In 1934, President Franklin D. Roosevelt and his New Deal policies started actively working on an anti-monopoly campaign against the aviation industry. This legislation resulted in the UA&T being reorganized into new companies: United Aircraft (later to be called United Technologies), United Airlines, and the Boeing Company. The timing of this governmental legislation was poor at best for most of the United States and the World was under the black cloud of the Great Depression. United Aircraft had to rely on foreign sales to survive as a company for the domestic market in the US was depressed. Hamilton started with the “United Aircraft Export Company” as a sales representative, quickly rising to become president of the corporation by 1936. Eugene Wilson described Hamilton as the “Yankee Peddler” and felt that he was a man that was full of “salesmanship” and was a “master-entertainer”.

Hamilton had set up his headquarters in Paris's George V Hotel, representing companies like Hamilton Standard, Sikorsky Aviation, Chance Vought Aircraft, and Pratt & Whitney. During the time from 1936 to 1940, Hamilton was successful in getting licensing rights for foreign countries to build Pratt & Whitney engines and Hamilton Standard variable-pitch propellers. According to Wilson, it was a fight for survival as an American company. He also mentioned there was a kind of naivete when it came to dealing with countries like Germany, Japan, and Russia. For example, a deal was set up with BMW to license them to build a number of Pratt & Whitney engines, which was approved by the United States Congress. This was granted because neither the US businessmen nor governmental officials expected any war in Europe. As Wilson stated, “thanks to Mr. Thomas F. Hamilton moving around through these different ministries, he could appraise this situation more clearly than most people. And he came back from one trip and in a meeting of the executive committee of our company he said, ‘Don't discount this fellow Hitler.’ ‘To you, he's got a Charlie Chaplin mustache, but whatever he may look on the outside, either he or somebody behind him has a strategic insight and a political foresight that is not available anywhere else in the world that I know of’ ”. It has also been suggested that Hamilton also tried to convince the United States Congress of the seriousness of doing business with countries like Germany, Japan, and Russia. However, at the time business interests came first and Hamilton was asked to continue in his position until the fall of France in 1940, after which Hamilton and his staff had to make an unorthodox exit out of Europe through Spain.

=== Return to the US ===
Once back in the United States, Hamilton found a different sort of career in the hotel and hospitality business. He started developing a resort on the coast of British Columbia, Canada at the entrance of Princess Louisa Inlet, called the Malibu Club in Canada (named after his yacht, MV Malibu, that had been designed by Ted Geary). It officially opened in July 1941 and catered to yachters, the wealthy, and the Hollywood crowd. However, the attack on Pearl Harbor changed Hamilton's plans and he again went back into the aviation industry to run Hardman aircraft (which made nacelles for the B-17 bombers) in Southern California during World War II, for the nominal salary of a dollar a year. After the war, he reopened Malibu and also started an airline called “Malibu SeaAero” that served the resort with a single war-surplus Grumman Goose. After a few years, Malibu was abandoned and sold due to financial difficulties. During his final years, he was involved with the Early Bird Organization where he was a regular participant until his death. Hamilton also loved to paint and spent many years in Paris working on his craft. He was also the technical assistant to the 1966 movie “Those Magnificent Men in their Flying Machines”.

== Death ==
Hamilton died on August 12, 1969. His funeral was held at All Saints Episcopal Church, Beverly Hills.
