= Ḵ'els =

Mountain in British Columbia, Canada

ḵ’els
- Location within British Columbia

Highest point
- Elevation: 2,088 m (6,850 ft)
- Prominence: 227 m (745 ft)
- Parent peak: Mount Alexander (2368 m)
- Listing: Mountains of British Columbia
- Coordinates: 50°14′52″N 123°59′00″W

Geography
- Country: Canada
- Province: British Columbia
- District: Lillooet Land District
- Parent range: Pacific Ranges
- Topo map: NTS 92J4 Princess Louisa Inlet

Climbing
- First ascent: 1931

ḵ’els is a mountain located at the head of lekw’emin (Jervis Inlet) above the ancestral shíshálh village site of x̱enichen and within the Pacific Ranges of the Coast Mountains of British Columbia, Canada. The mountain is associated with a shíshálh legend about a great flood.

In 1860, during a survey by HMS Plumper, the mountain was named "Mount Victoria" after Princess Beatrice Mary Victoria who was the ninth child of Queen Victoria and Prince Albert. The name ḵ’els, which means "anchor" in she shashishalhem, was legally restored on June 21, 2023.

The first colonial ascent of ḵ’els was made in 1931 by Arthur Tinniswood Dalton and Percy Williams Easthope.
