= Princess Louisa Inlet =

Inlet in British Columbia, Canada

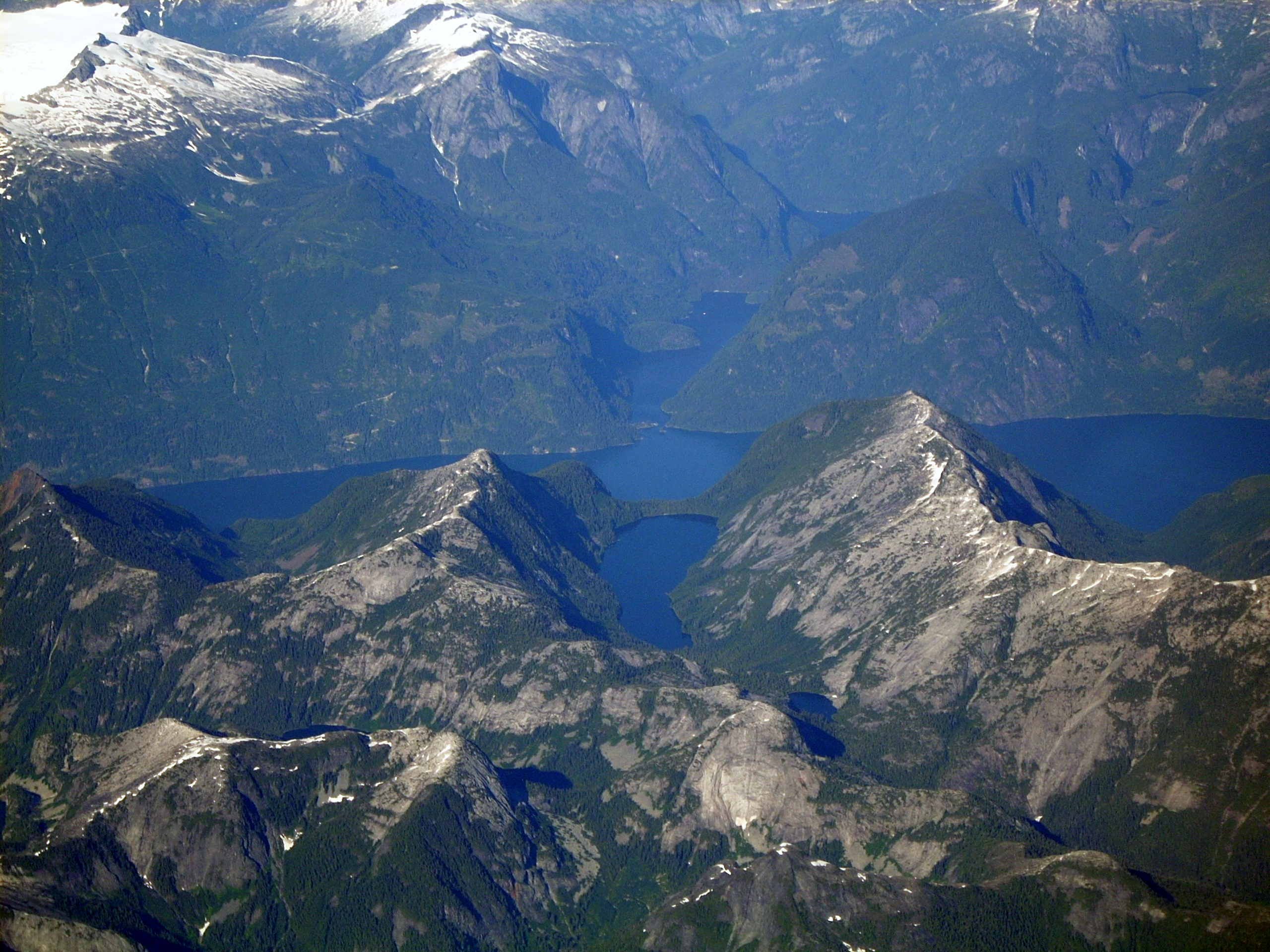
- Aerial view

- Location within British Columbia
- Location: East side of Queens Reach, New Westminster Land District
- Coordinates: 50°11′05″N 123°48′11″W
- Type: fjord
- Basin countries: Canada
- Max. length: 6 km (3.7 mi)
- Max. depth: 179 m (587 ft)
- Islands: Malibu Isle, MacDonald Island

Princess Louisa Inlet is a fjord on British Columbia’s Sunshine Coast and within the swiya (world, "Territory") of the shíshálh Nation.

The inlet is 6 km (3.7 mi) in length and lies at the northeastern end of the Queens Reach of Jervis Inlet. The Malibu Rapids form the entrance of the inlet.

Princess Louisa Marine Provincial Park, established in 1964, is located at the head of the inlet. The park is home to James Bruce Falls and Chatterbox Falls along Loquilts Creek, a large stream that flows into the head of the inlet.

== History ==
A shíshálh village known as asxwikwu was historically located at the mouth of the inlet.

In June 1792, George Vancouver, charting the BC Coast in a search for the Northwest Passage, explored Jervis Inlet to its end, and found the entrance to Princess Louisa Inlet but did not enter as the tide was ebbing through Malibu Rapids at the time. In 1860, Captain George Richards surveyed and mapped Jervis and Princess Louisa Inlets, naming them and surrounding features. In the same year, Commander Richard Charles Mayne explored the valley at the head of the inlet hoping that it would lead to the interior of British Columbia.

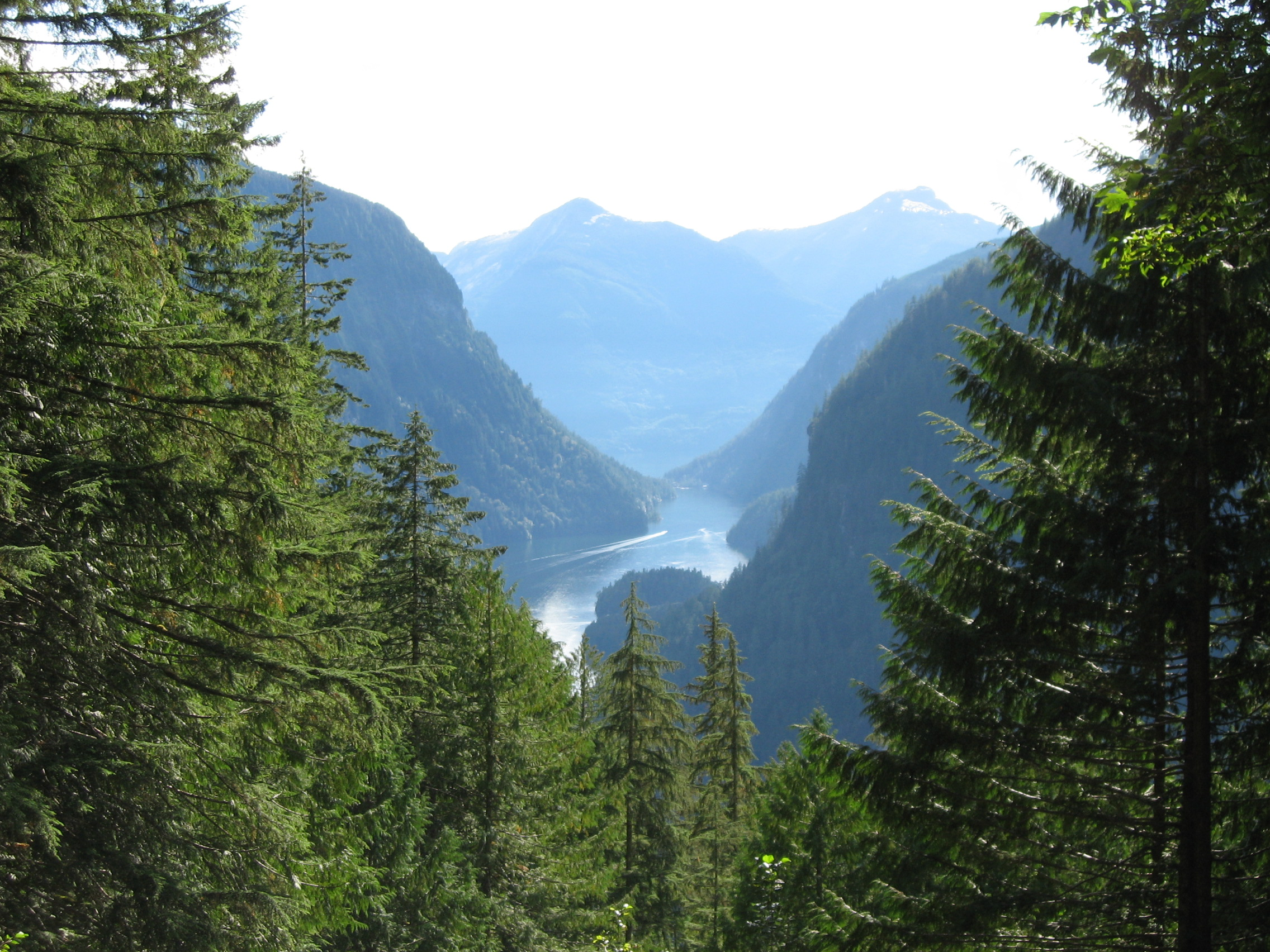
View of inlet from trappers cabin above Chatterbox Falls.

In 1919, James F. "Mac" MacDonald purchased 45 acres (18 ha) of land along the inlet and donated it to the Princess Louisa International Society in 1953. The land was acquired by BC Parks in 1964. Much of the remaining land surrounding the inlet has been acquired and added to the park in the following years. Hamilton Island, renamed MacDonald Island, is now a part of the park as well.

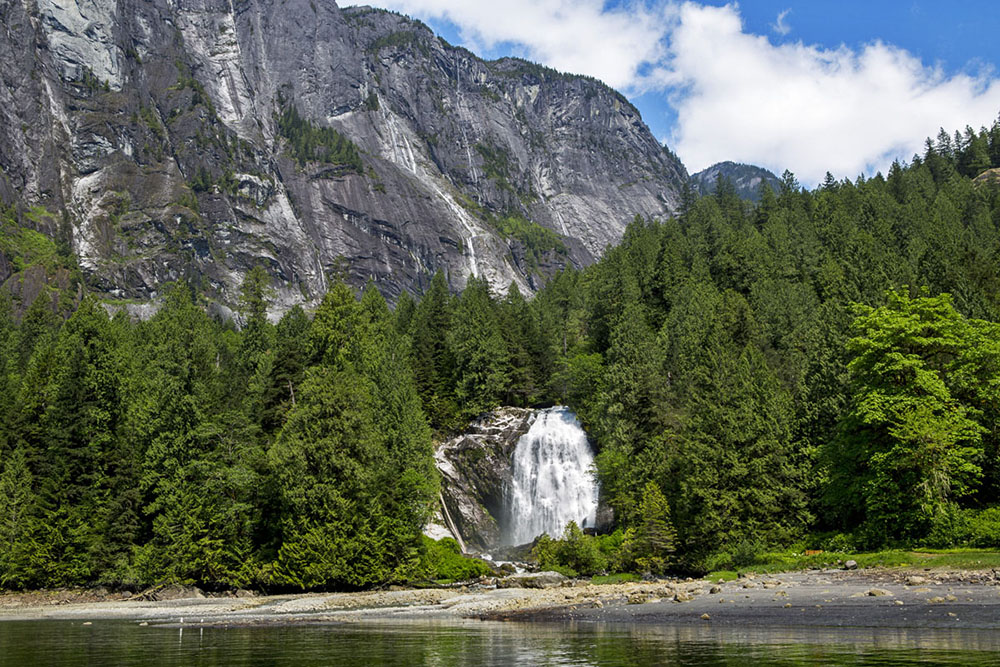
Chatterbox Falls at the head of Princess Louisa Inlet.

In 1940, Herman Caspar, who was rumored to have homesteaded at the entrance of the inlet, sold the land to Thomas F. Hamilton for $500. Casper was a squatter and had no legal right to the land. Hamilton, an American aviation executive, did buy all the land surrounding Princess Louisa Inlet with the intent on developing it with a series of themed luxury resorts to cater to visiting yachtsmen and Hollywood celebrities. However, only one resort was built at the entrance of the inlet, the Malibu Club which was named after Hamilton's yacht, the Malibu. In 1950, the resort was closed and abandoned due to a polio outbreak and quarantine. The property was later sold to Young Life in 1953 and has since operated it as a non-denominational Christian summer camp for teenagers.

== Naming of the inlet ==
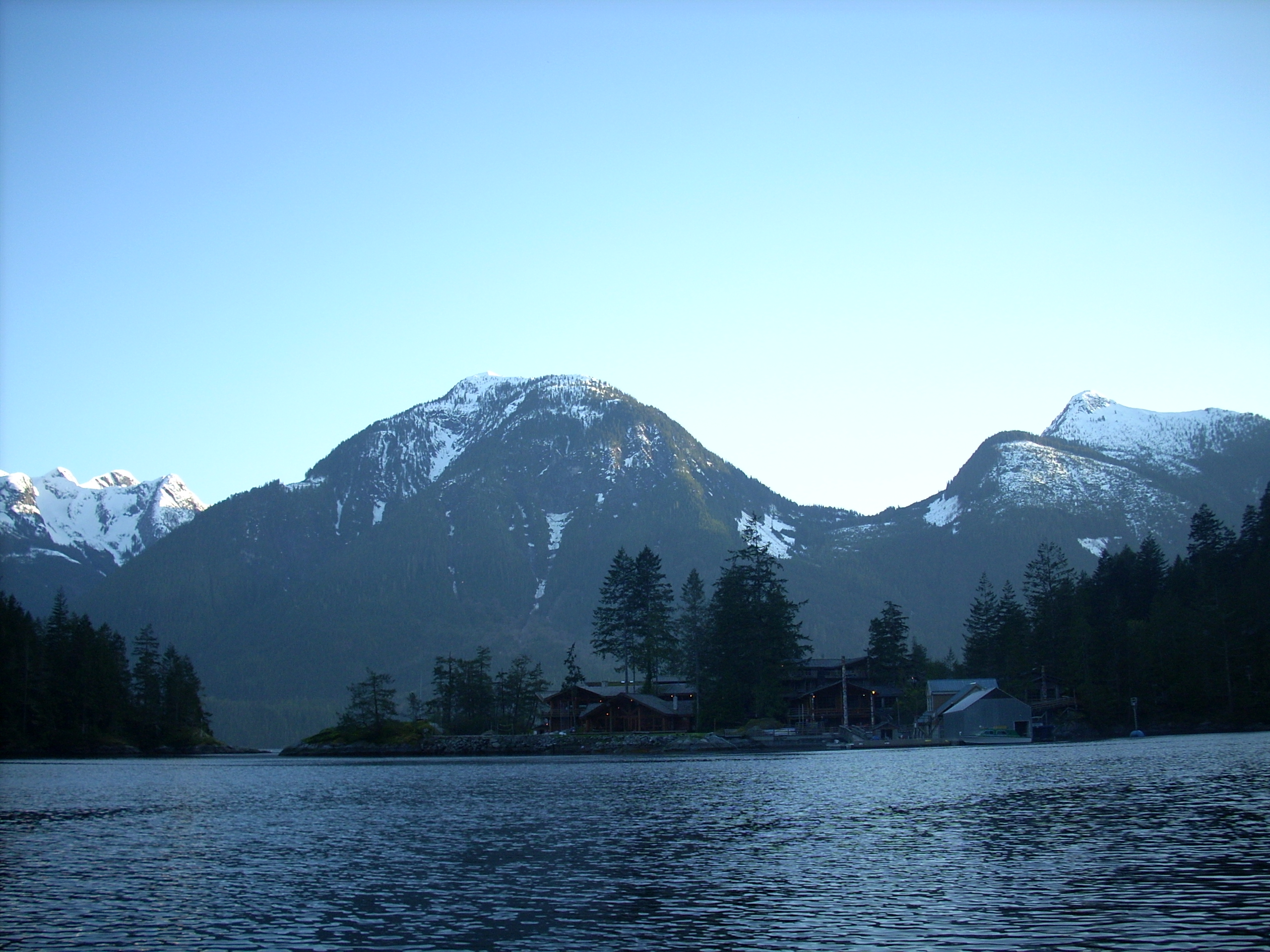
Mount Arthur rising above Malibu Club at the inlet entrance.

The inlet is known as swiwelat in she shashishalhem, the language of the indigenous shíshálh People of the region.

The inlet's English name may commemorate the Princess Louise, the fourth daughter of Queen Victoria, whose husband was the Marquess of Lorne, Governor General of Canada. The viceregal couple travelled extensively in Canada. Princess Louise spent three months in Victoria, in 1876 and was popular to the point that when the Governor General announced that the awaited completion of the transcontinental railway would pass through the Selkirk Mountains at the Kicking Horse Pass into what has since become Vancouver, rather than by the Yellowhead Pass to Bute Inlet and then to Victoria, Premier Robert Beaven asked Duke whether it would be possible for Vancouver Island to become a separate kingdom with Princess Louise as Queen. The more accepted theory is that the inlet is named for Queen Victoria's mother, Princess Victoria of Saxe-Coburg-Saalfeld, who was born Mary Louise Victoria. The actual source of the name is uncertain. The adjacent Prince of Wales Reach was named after Edward VII when he was the Prince of Wales. Princess Royal Reach was named after Empress Frederick of Germany. Five mountains around Queens Reach are named after the children of Queen Victoria: Mount Victoria, Mount Alfred, Mount Alice, Mount Arthur and Mount Helena.

== MacDonald Island ==
MacDonald Island is part of Princess Louisa Inlet in British Columbia, located approximately 4 km beyond the entrance of the inlet at Malibu Rapids towards the head of the inlet at Chatterbox Falls. It is a popular mooring place for it is one of the few shallow places of the deep fjord. The island was originally named after a man who built a cabin at Chatterbox Falls, James F. MacDonald. The cabin, which stood for many years, has now collapsed, but traces of it still remain. In 1940, the island was then named "Hamilton Island" after Thomas F. Hamilton, who built the Malibu Club and purchased the land from MacDonald for $18,000. In 1972, the name reverted to the original name of MacDonald Island.

== Access ==
The nearest road access to the inlet is about 50 km (31 mi) away at the BC Ferries landing on Highway 101 at Earls Cove. The area is a popular destination for boaters and can also be accessed by float plane from various locations around the Strait of Georgia and water taxi from Earls Cove. Boaters should note that Malibu Rapids is a narrow entrance and at spring tide can have a current of 9 knots (17 km/h; 10 mph).

== Gallery ==
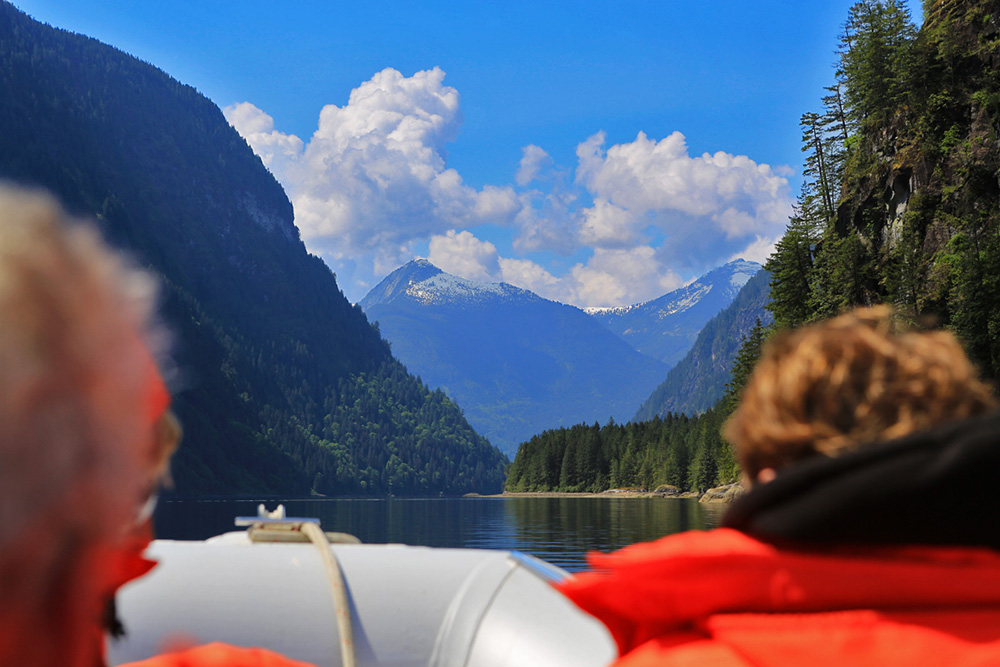
Inlet from boat.

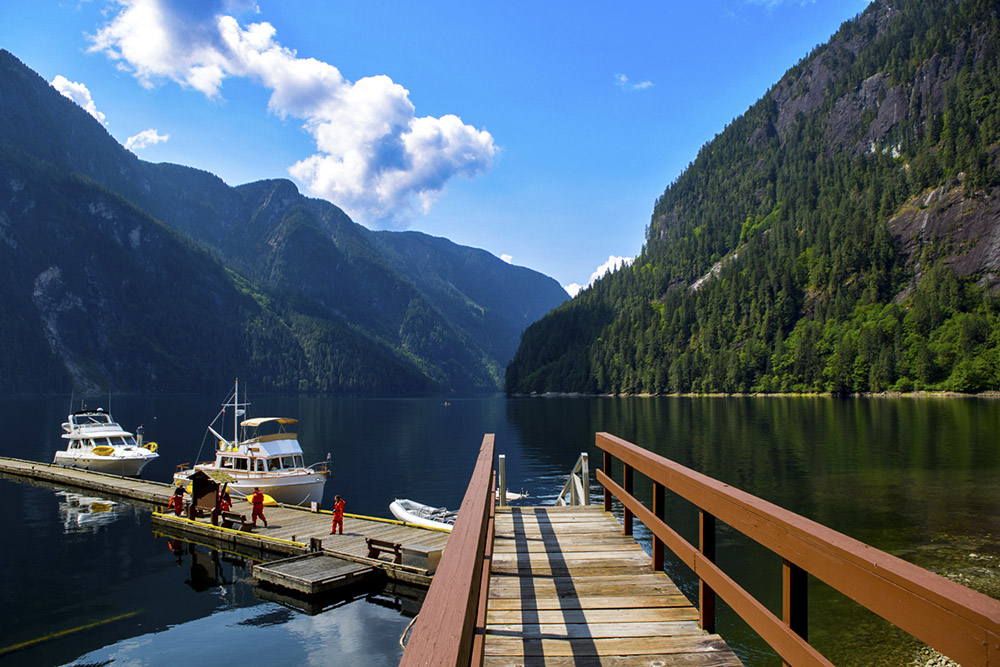
Harbour

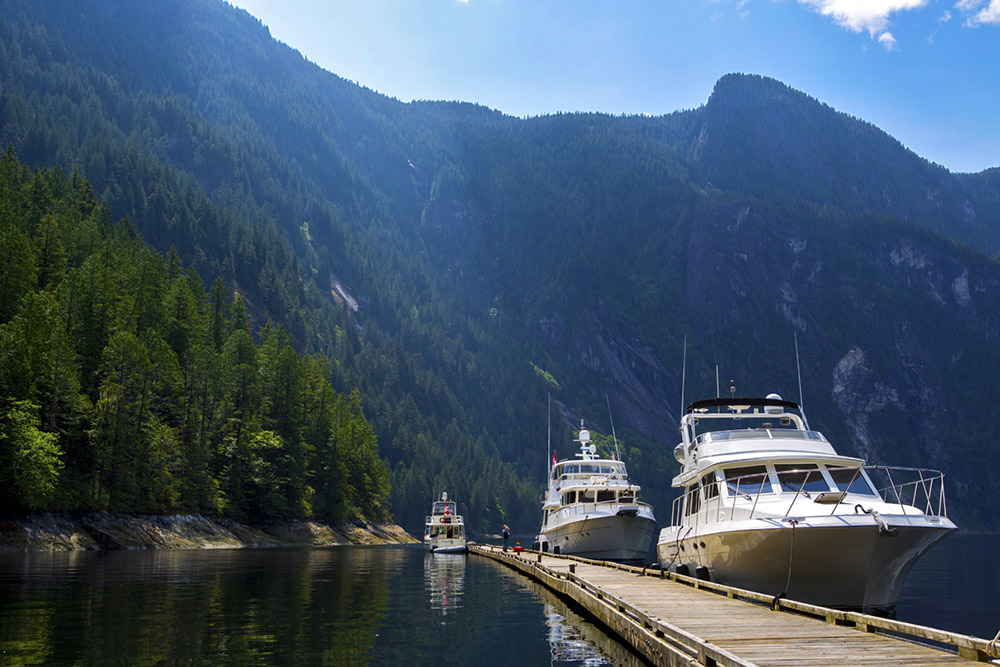

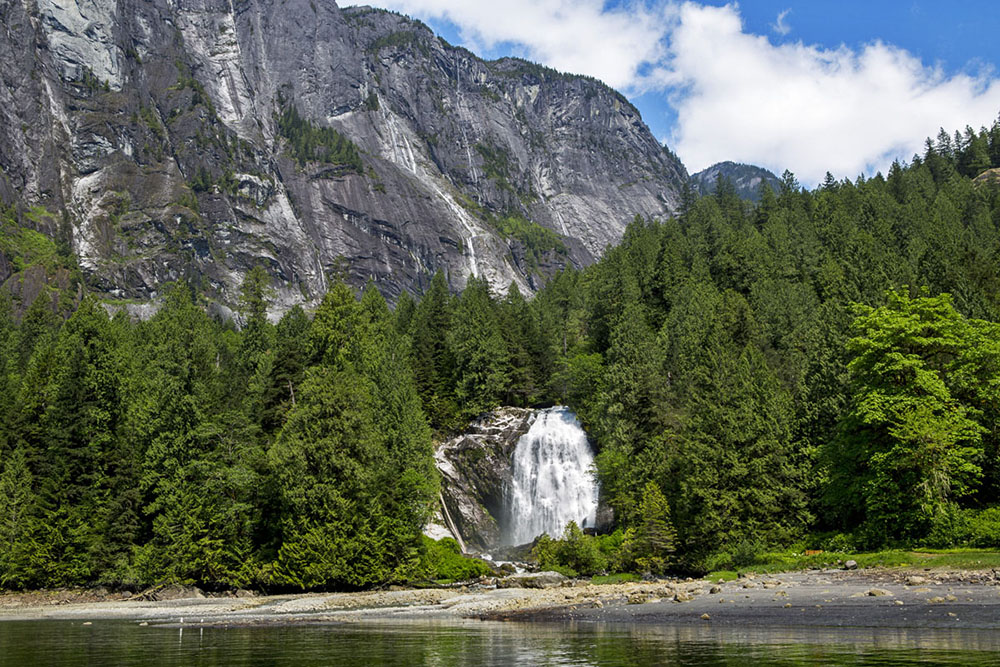

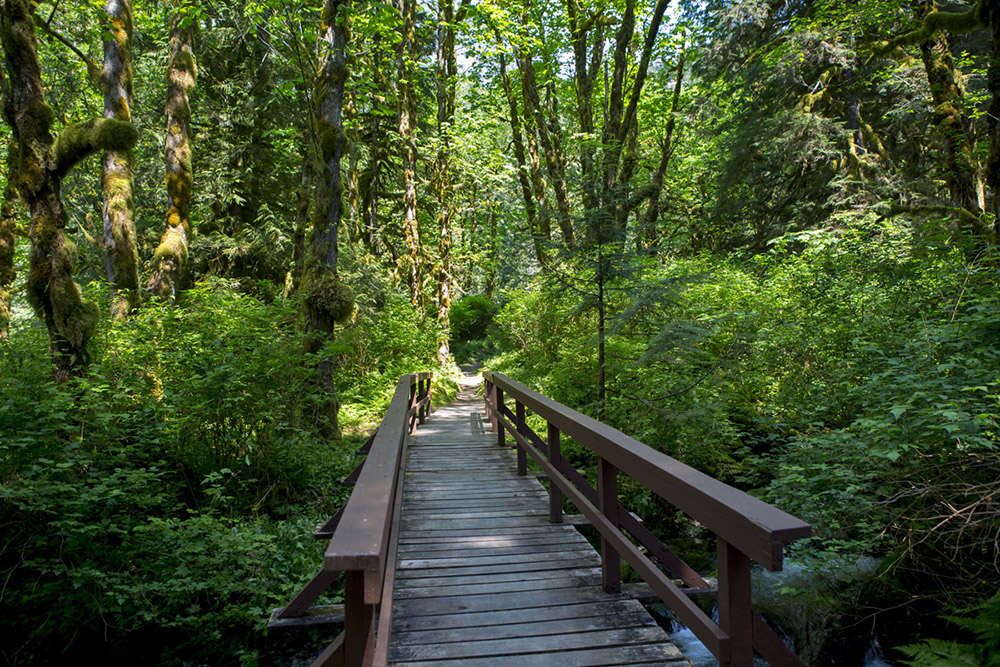

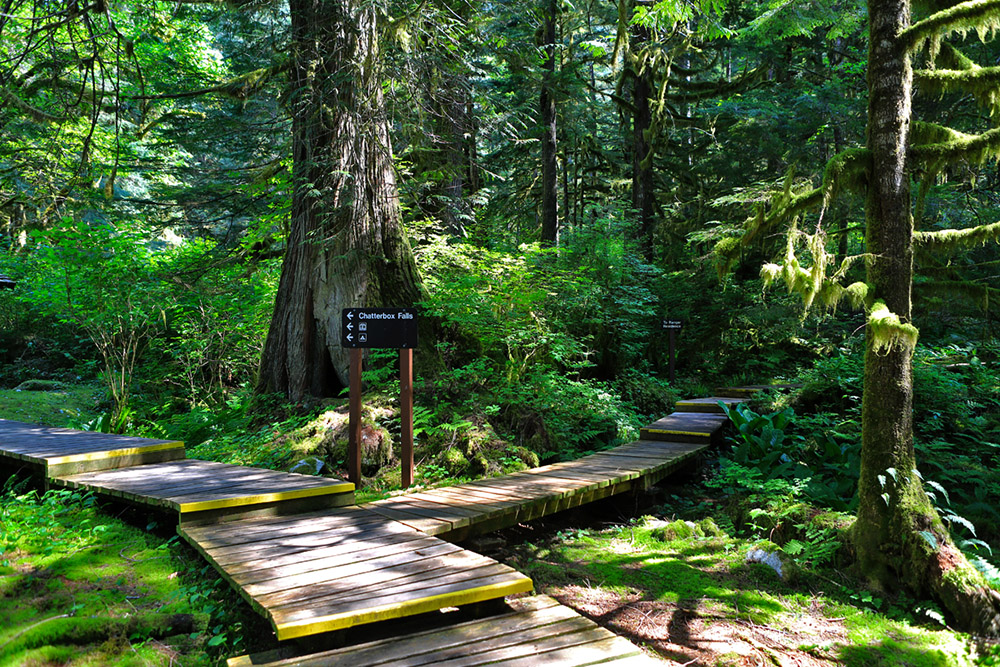
Path to the falls.

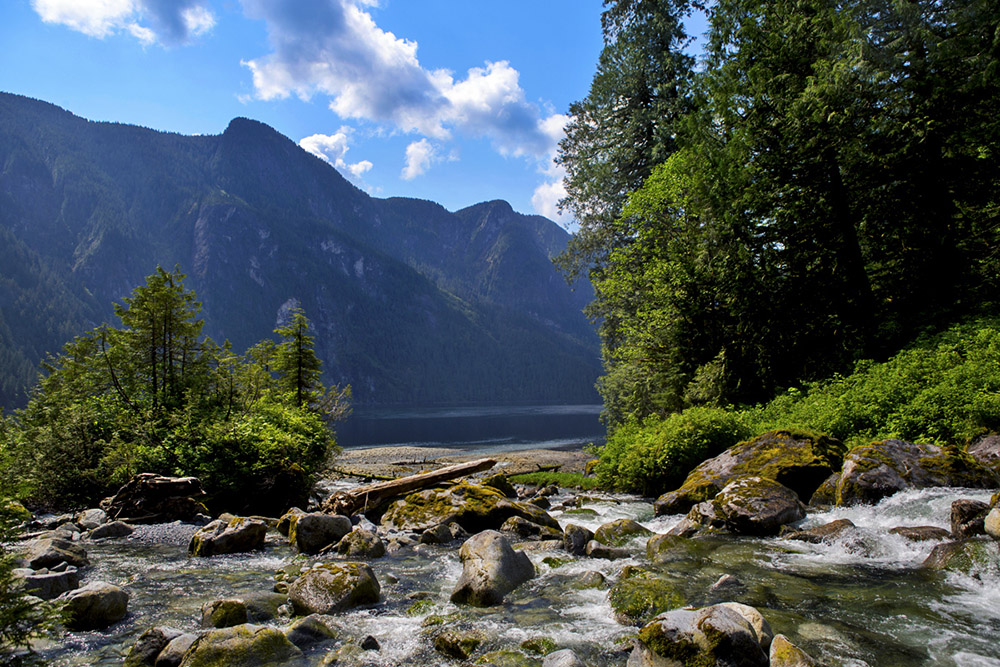
Stream from Chatterbox Falls.

== See also ==
- Robert Genn
- Royal eponyms in Canada
