= Princess Louisa Marine Provincial Park =

Provincial park in British Columbia, Canada

- IUCN category II (national park)
- Location within Vancouver Island Location within British Columbia
- Interactive map of Princess Louisa Marine Provincial Park
- Location: British Columbia, Canada
- Nearest city: Powell River
- Coordinates: 50°12′35″N 123°46′36″W
- Area: 9.64 km^{2} (3.72 sq mi)
- Established: June 24, 1965
- Governing body: BC Parks
- Website: bcparks.ca/princess-louisa-marine-park/

Princess Louisa Marine Provincial Park is a provincial park in British Columbia, Canada surrounding Princess Louisa Inlet.

== Gallery ==
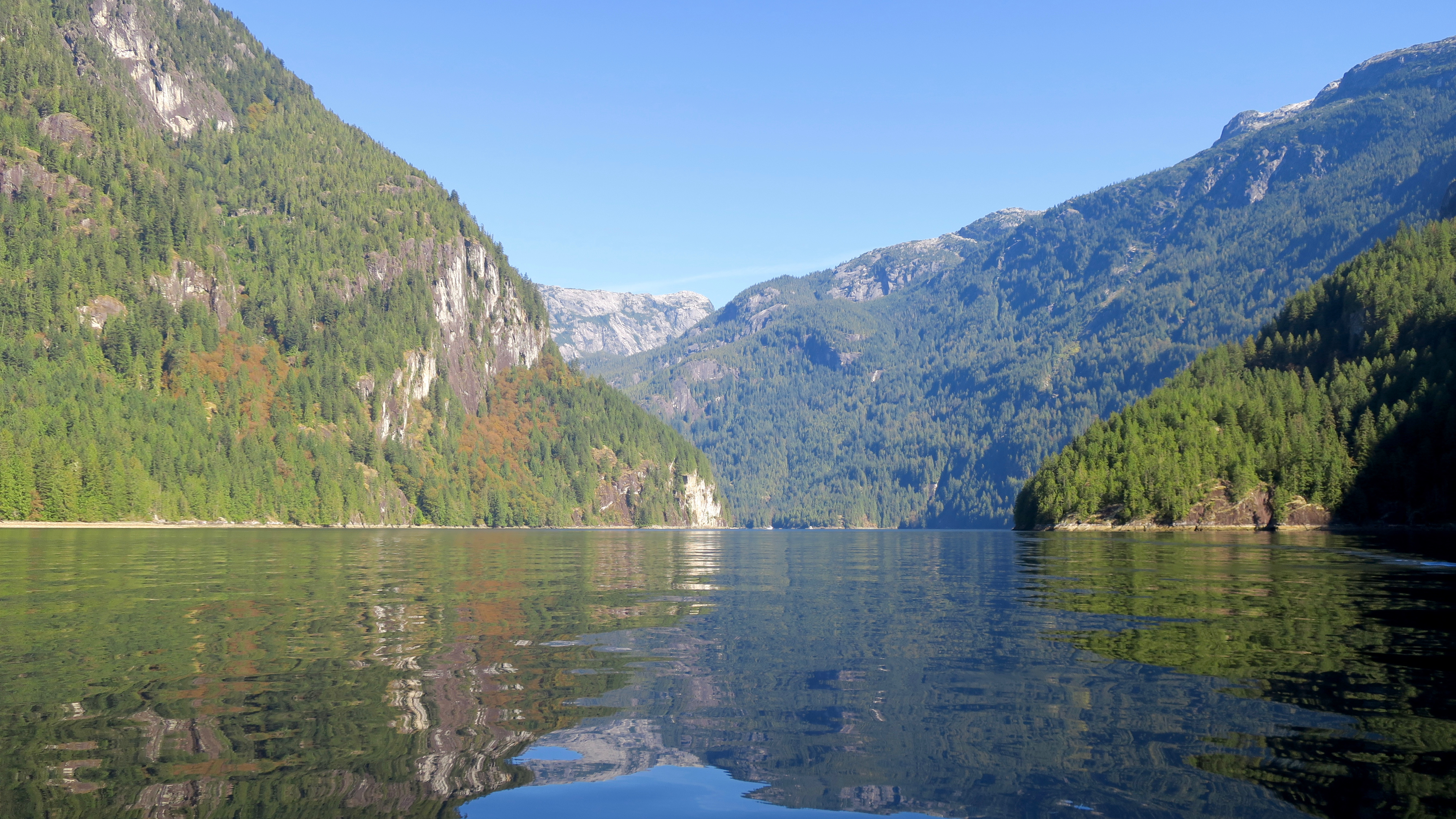
A view of Princess Louisa Inlet

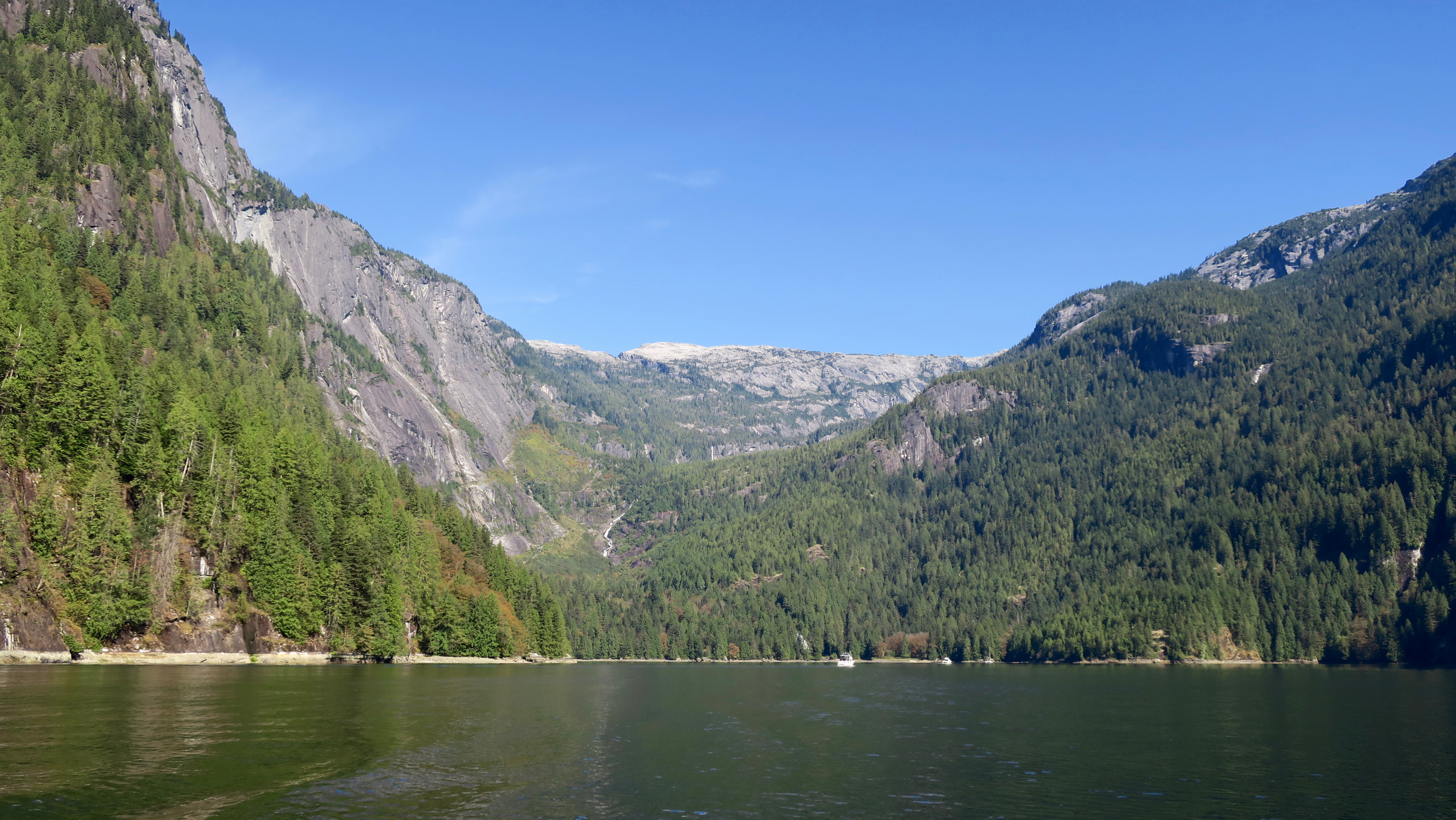
Another inlet view

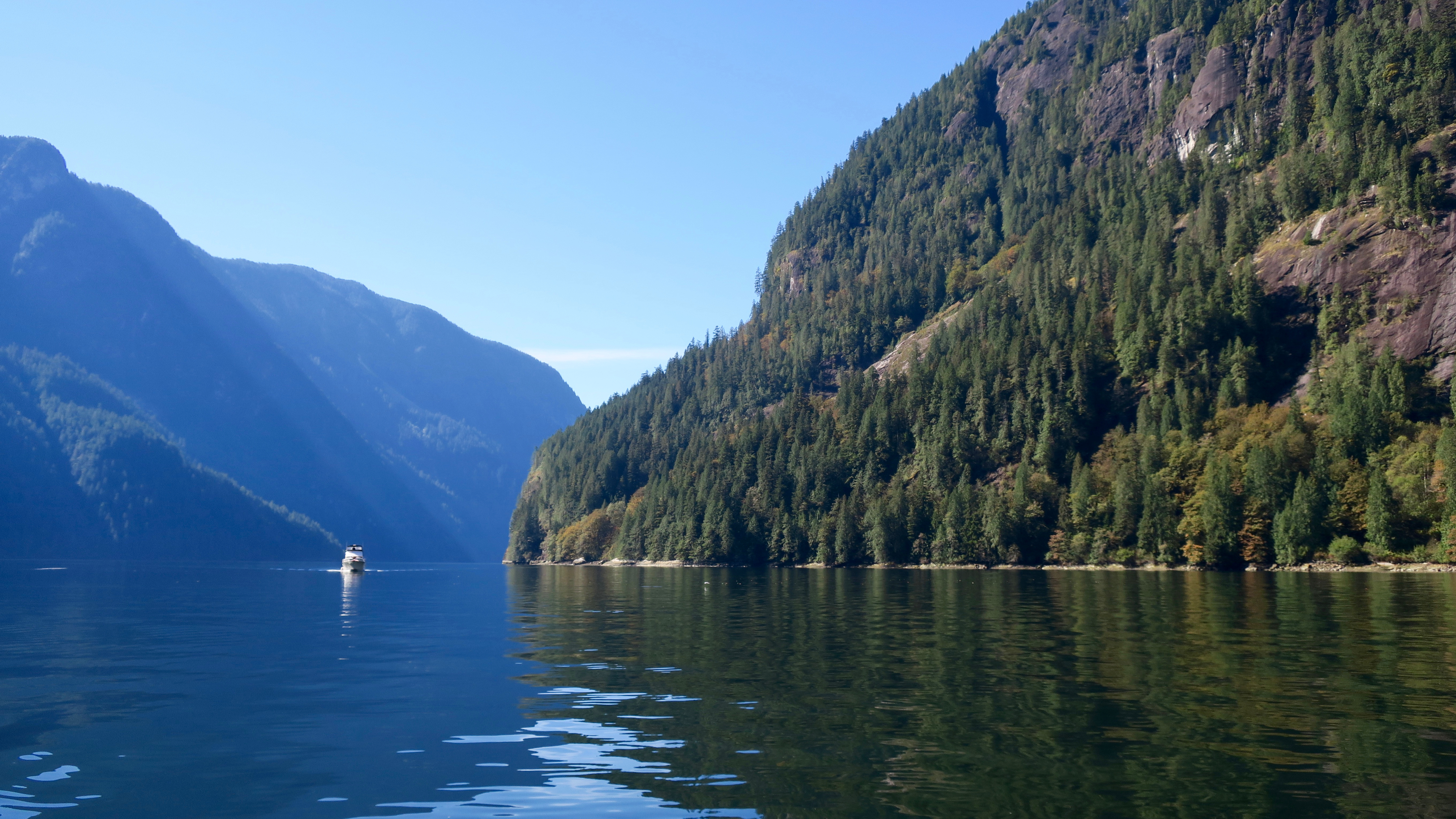
A boat travelling in calm waters

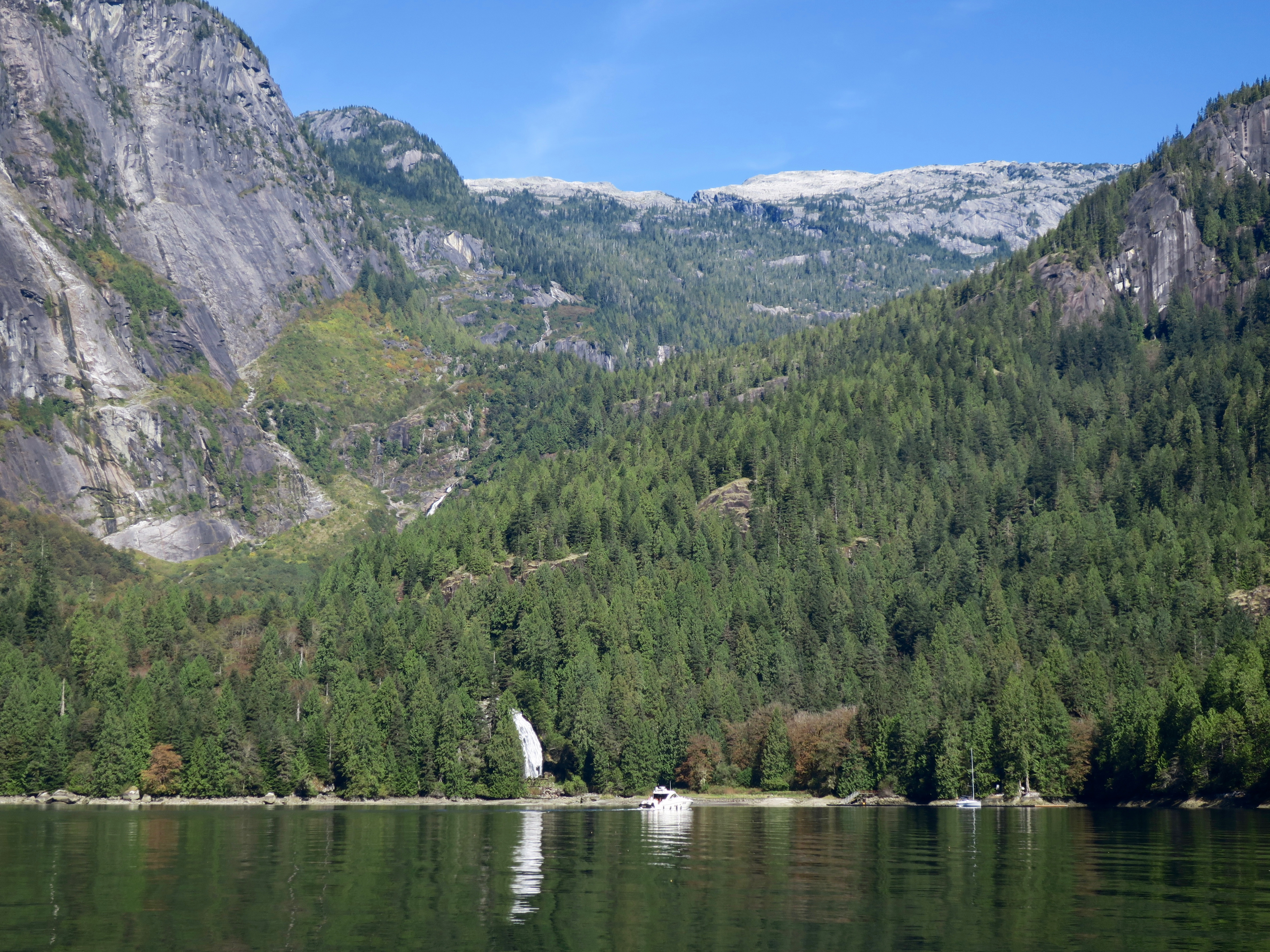
Boats docked at the park

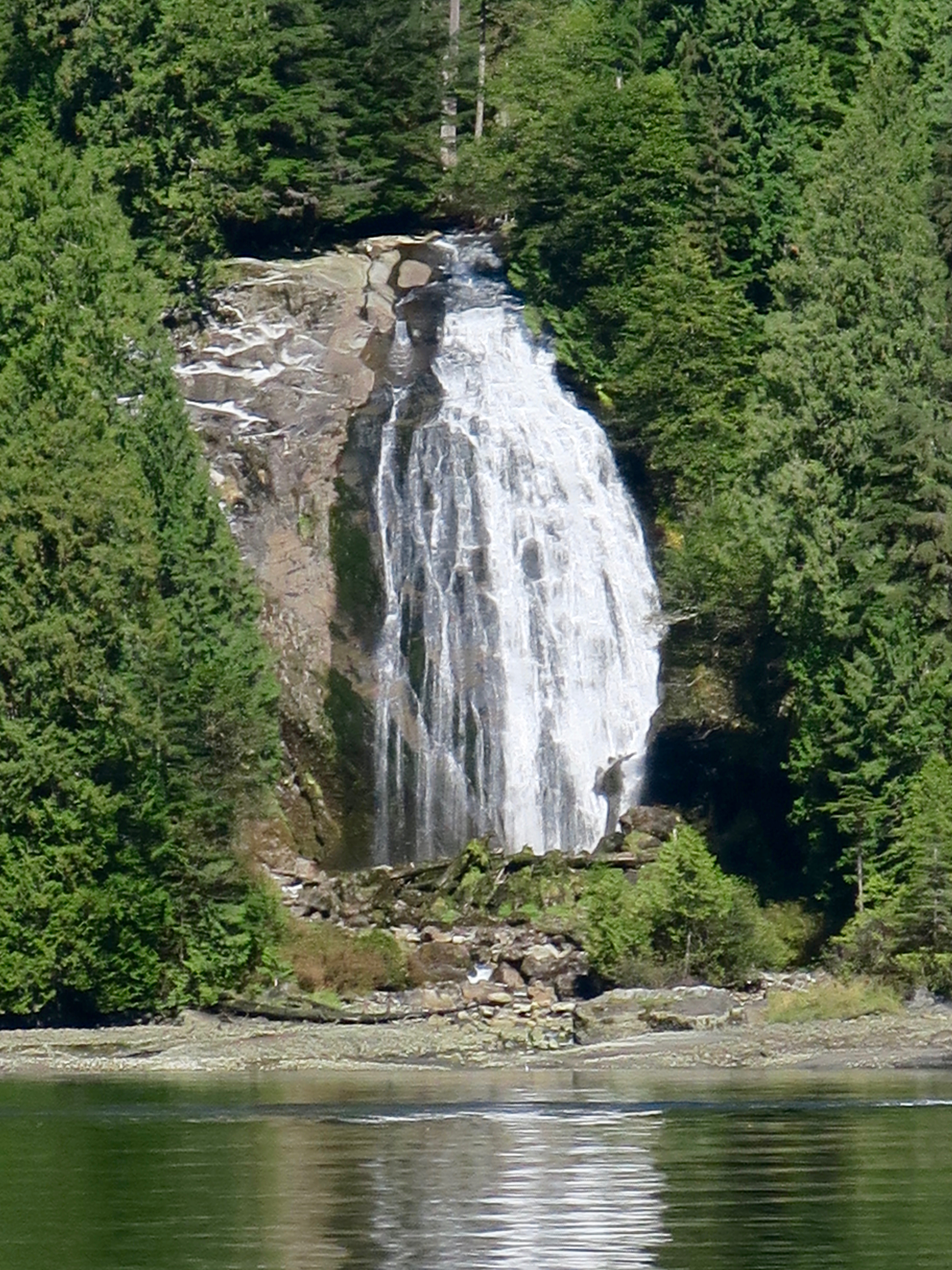
A waterfall next to the coast

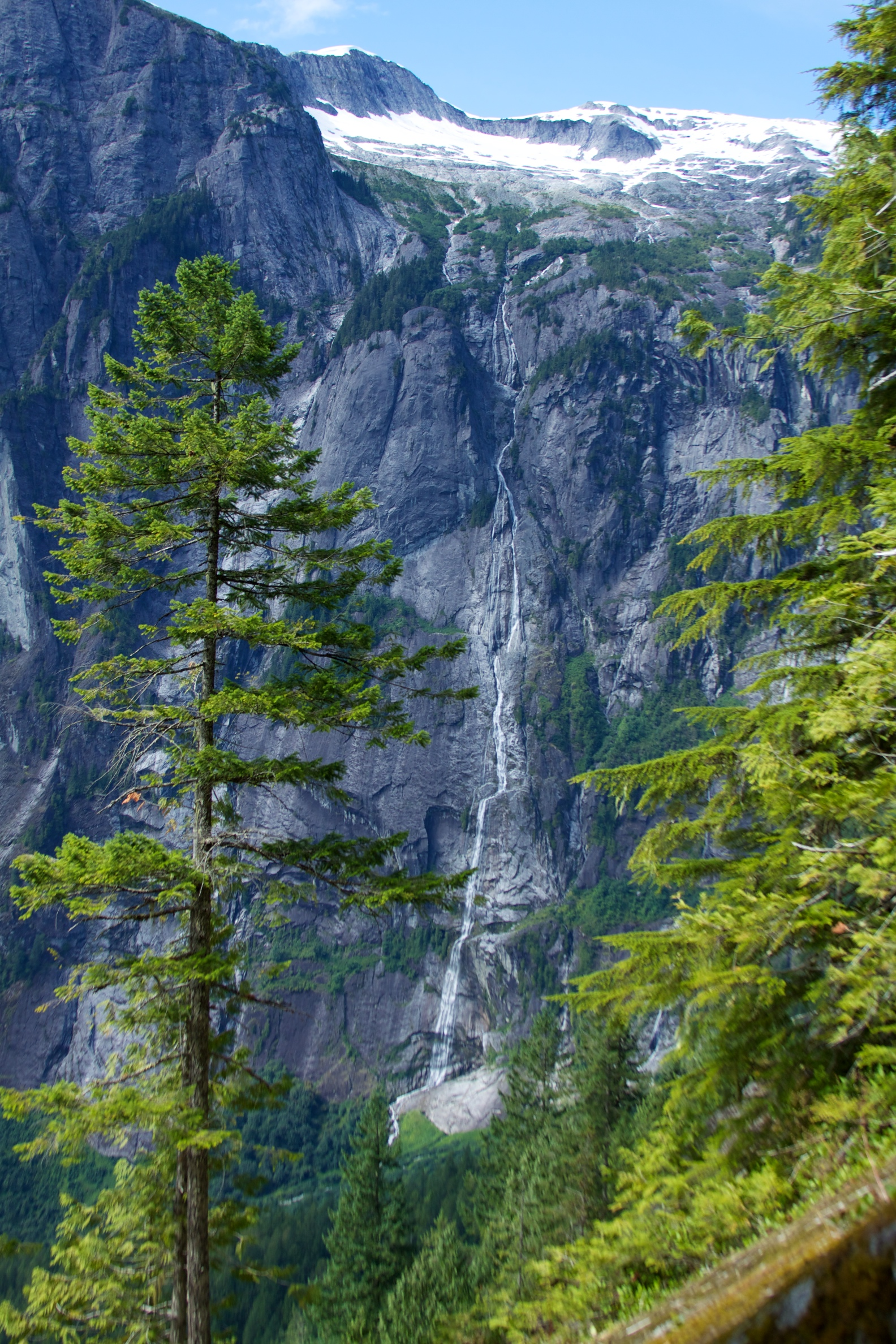
James Bruce Falls, the tallest waterfall in Canada and North America

== See also ==
- Royal eponyms in Canada
