= Mount Helena (British Columbia) =

Mountain in British Columbia, Canada

- Location within British Columbia
- Interactive map of Mount Helena

Highest point
- Elevation: 1,564 m (5,131 ft)
- Prominence: 274 m (899 ft)
- Coordinates: 50°11′22″N 123°51′34″W

Geography
- Location: Jervis Inlet , British Columbia, Canada
- District: Cowichan Land District
- Parent range: Pacific Ranges
- Topo map: NTS 92J4 Princess Louisa Inlet

Mount Helena is a mountain located at the Queen Reach arm of Jervis Inlet and behind Princess Louisa Inlet. Mount Helena is part of the Pacific Ranges of the Coast Mountains in British Columbia Canada. The mountain was named during the 1860 survey by HMS Plumper who charted all of the known area and named the mountain after Princess Helena Augusta Victoria "Lenchen" who was the fifth child of Queen Victoria and Prince Albert of England.

== See also ==
- Royal eponyms in Canada
