= Malibu Rapids (British Columbia) =

- Location within British Columbia

- Map of the Malibu Rapids
- Location: South end of Princess Louisa Inlet, New Westminster Land District
- Coordinates: 50°9′50.91″N 123°50′58.97″W
- Basin countries: British Columbia, Canada
- Max. depth: 13 m (43 ft)

The Malibu Rapids forms the entrance to Princess Louisa Inlet and is also connected to the Jervis Inlet. The tidal flow of both inlets pass through this narrow and shallow passage that creates a fast moving (approximately 9 kn or 17 km/h) and strong tidal rapids during the peak flows. At slack tide, the entrance is virtually flat calm similar to the Skookumchuck Narrows near the entrance of the Jervis Inlet.

The way to determine the direction of the tidal flow at the narrows is to observe the direction in which the tide is flowing. If the tidal flow is heading toward the Jervis Inlet then the tide is going out (low tide). But if the flow is moving toward Princess Louisa Inlet the tide it is coming in (high tide).

The entrance is large enough to allow marine traffic through. The narrow passage is defined by Malibu Isle and a System B type Lateral navigation beacon on the Jervis Inlet side and Malibu and the mainland on the Princess Louisa Inlet side.

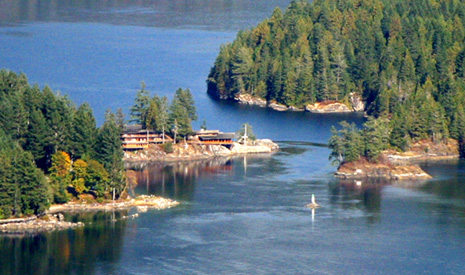

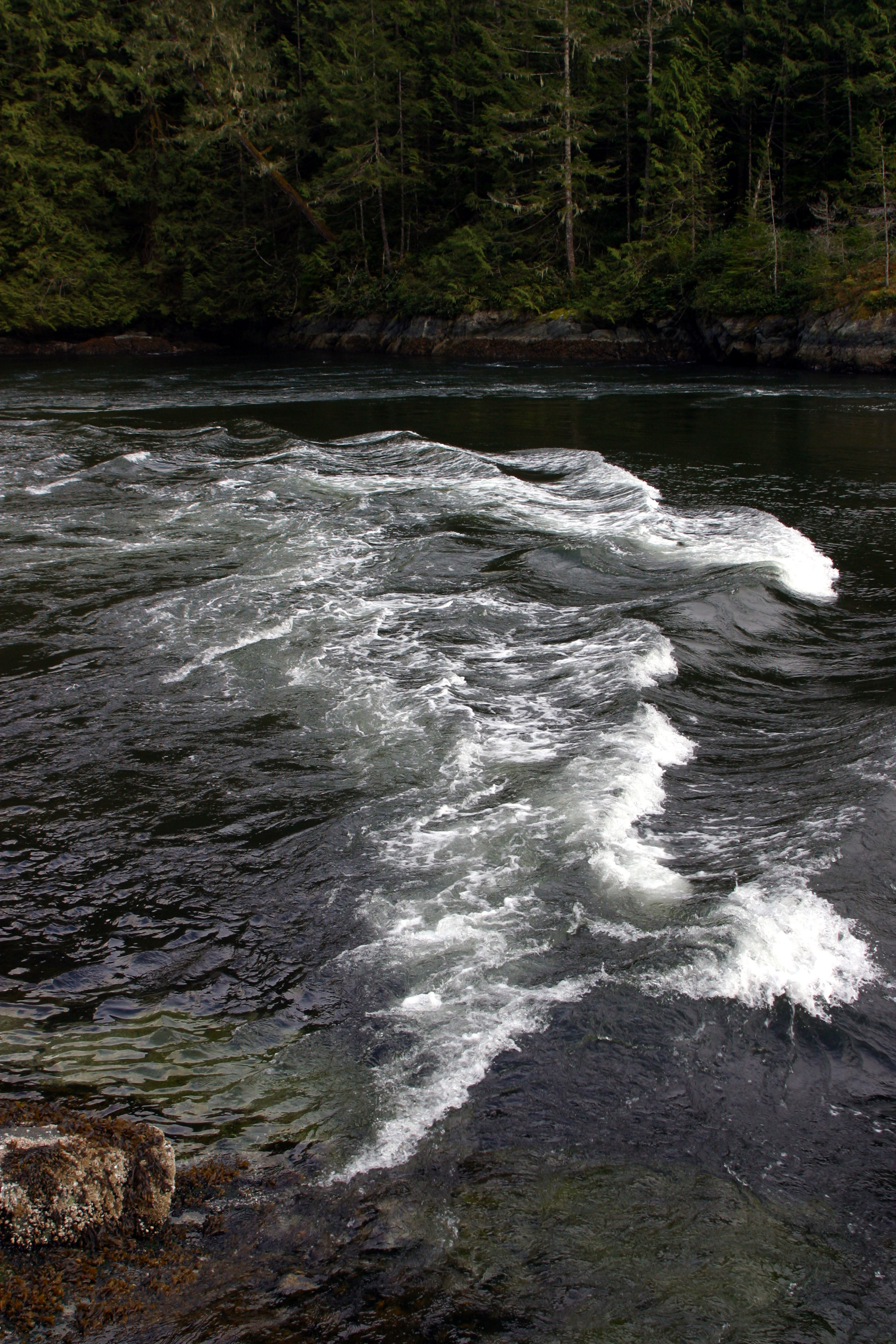

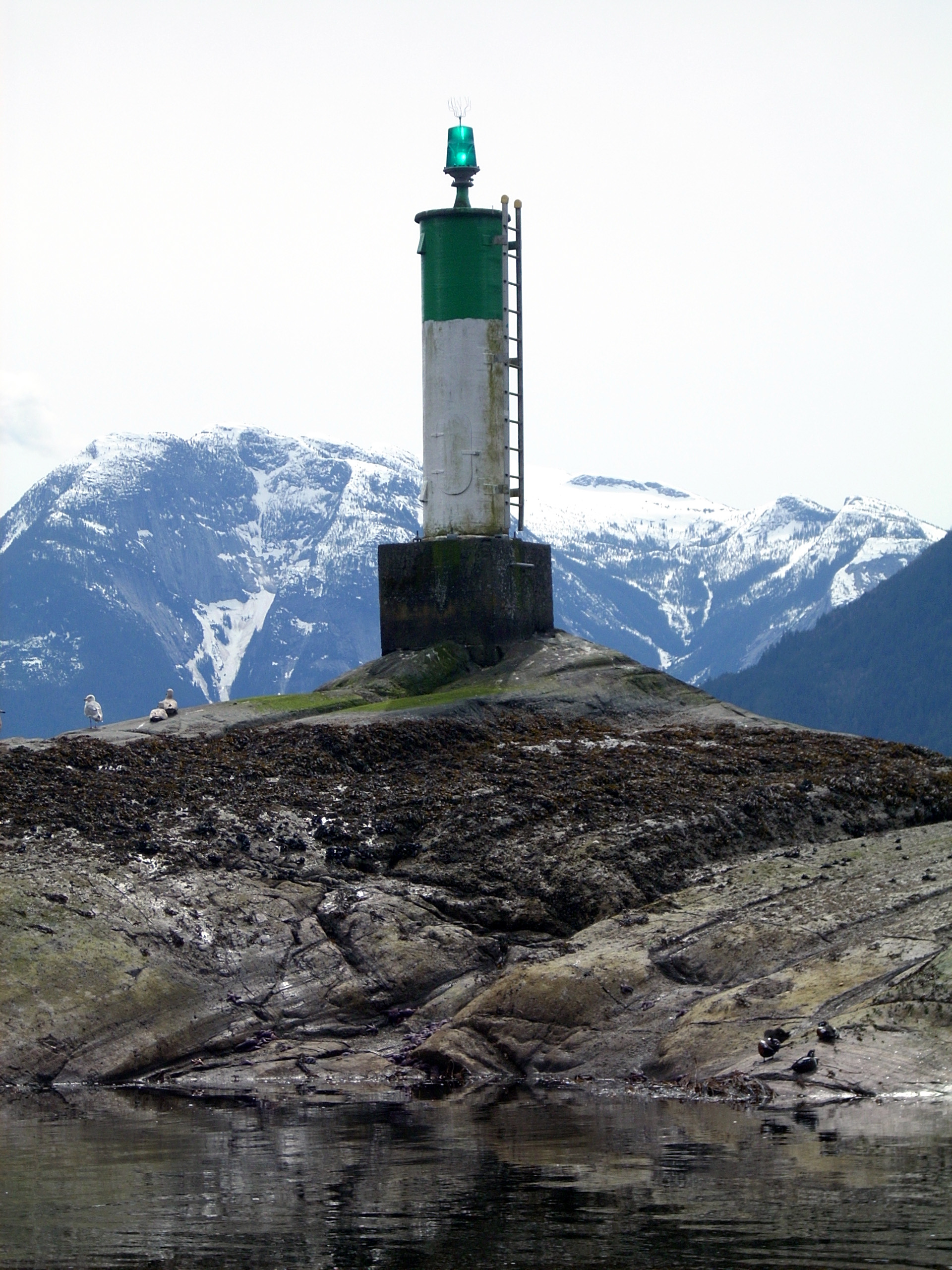

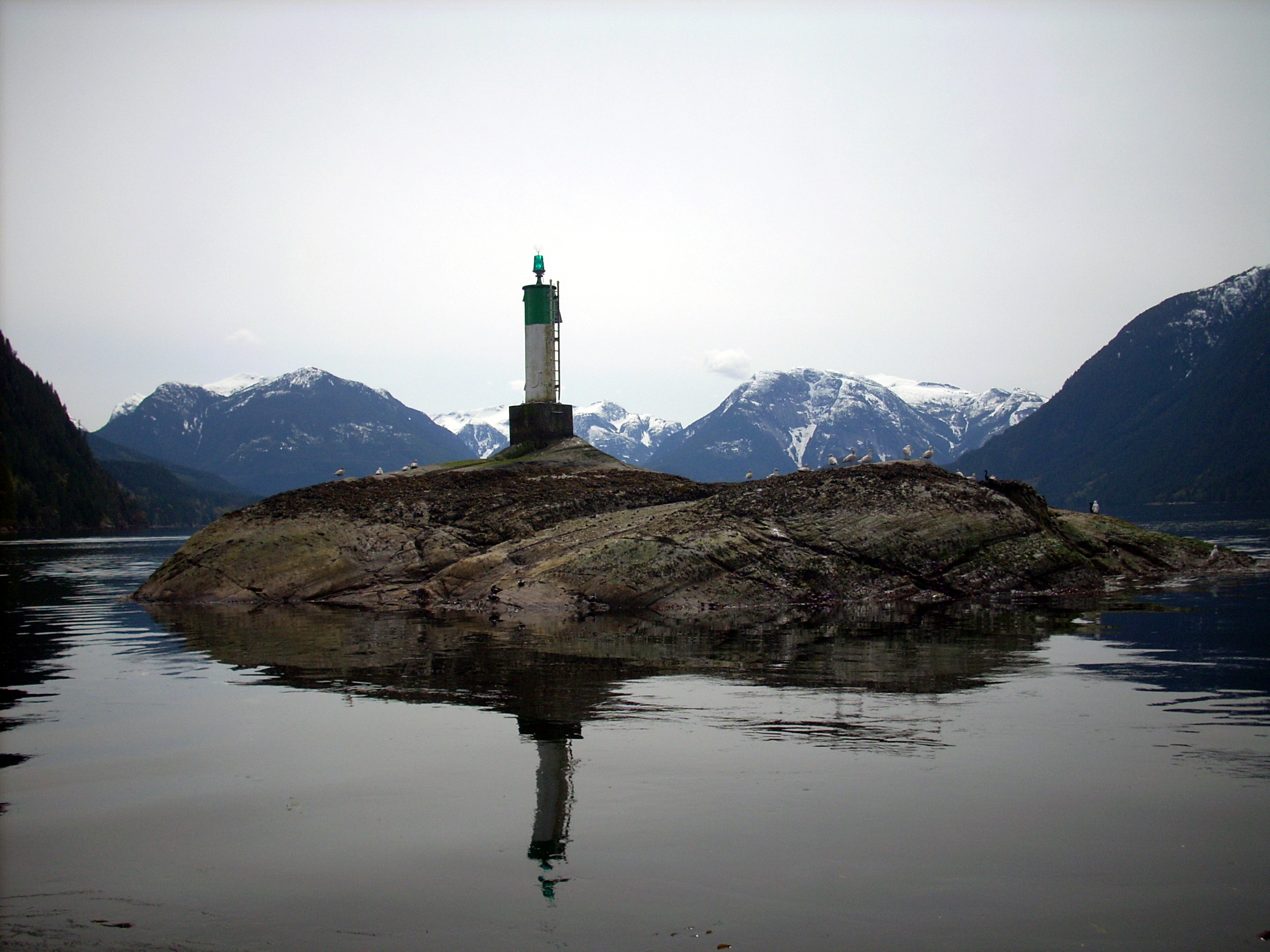

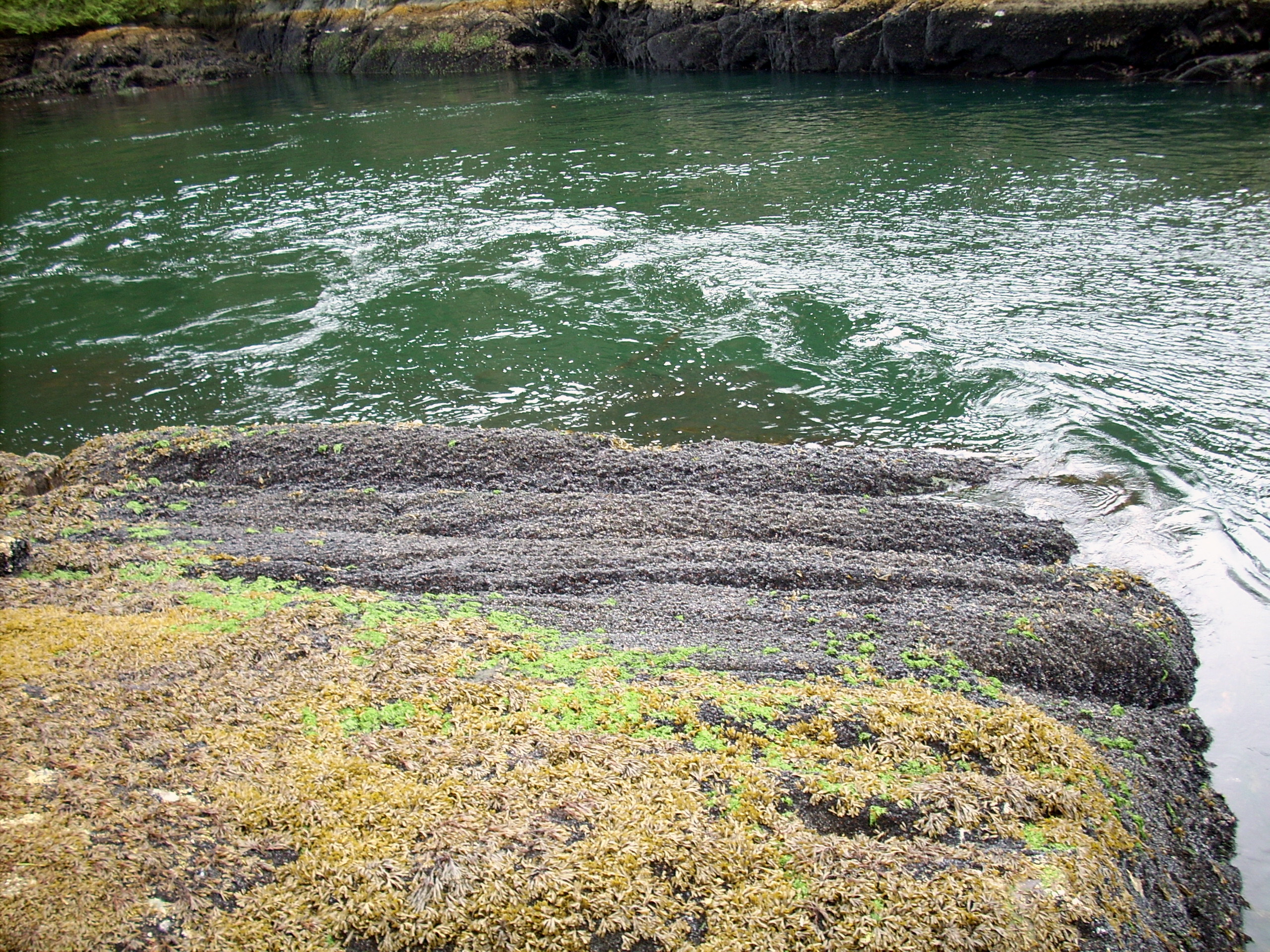

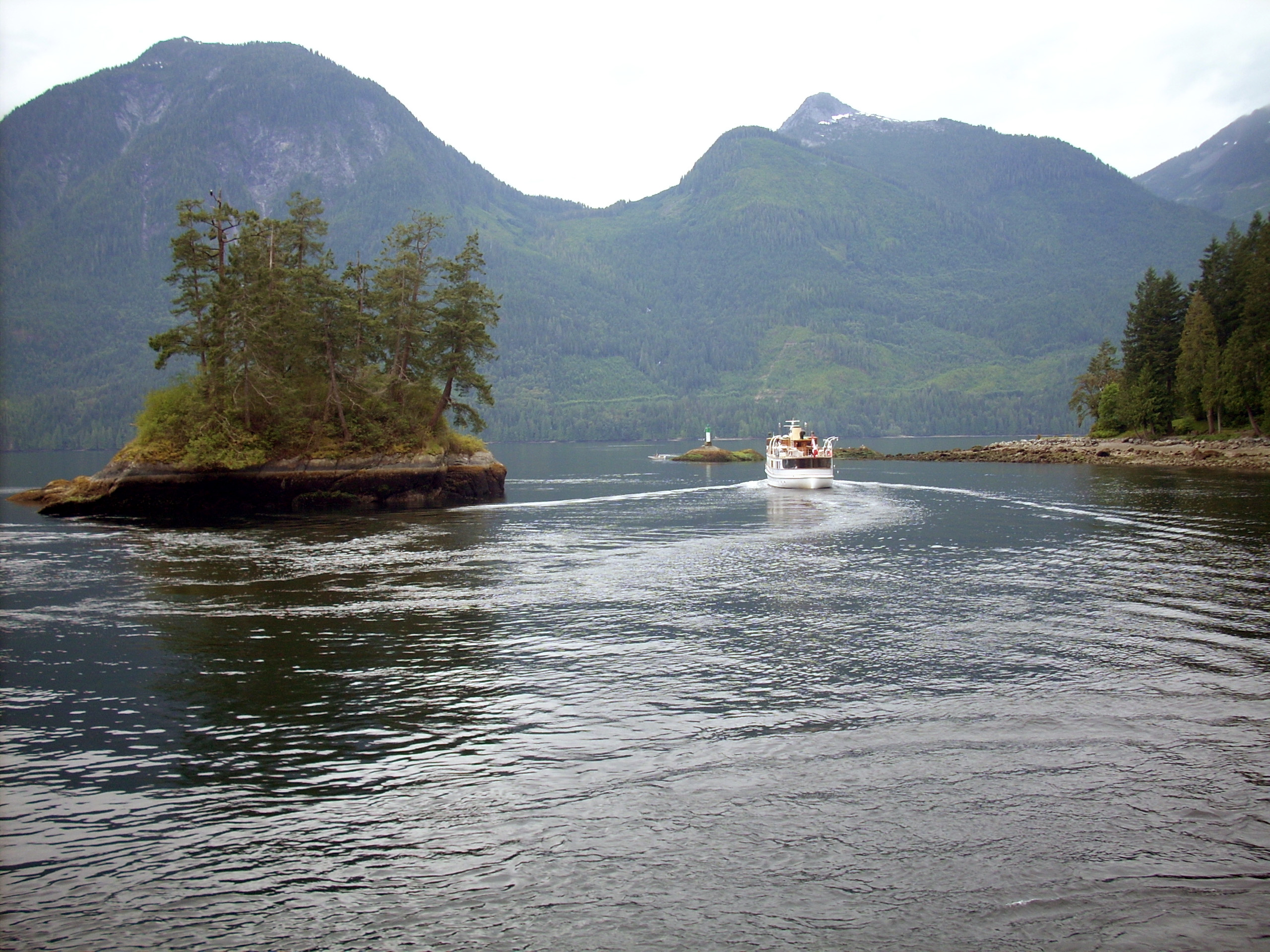

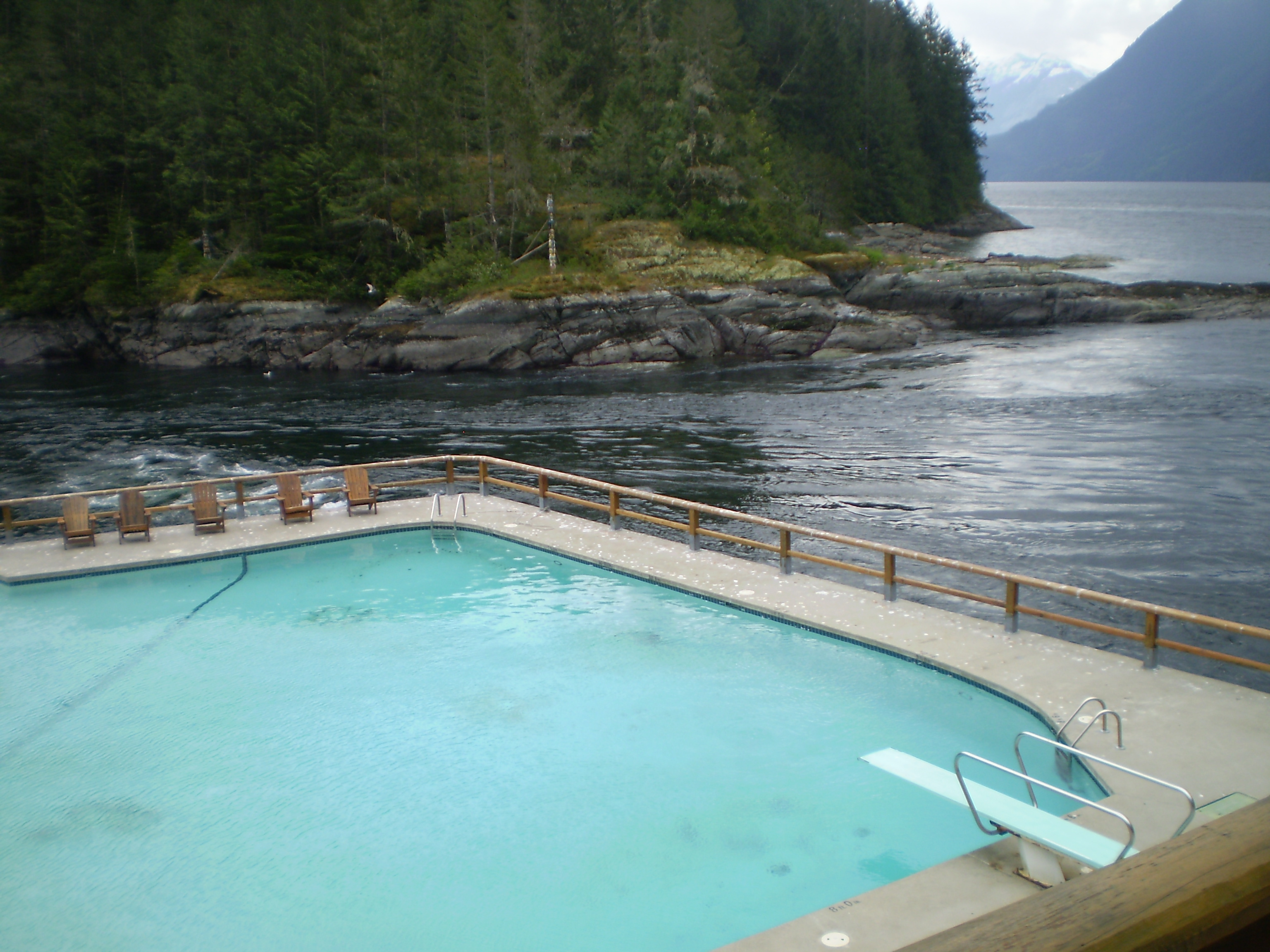
