= Malibu, British Columbia =

Coordinates: 50°9′52.44″N 123°51′4.51″W

- Youth Camp
- Interactive map of Malibu, British Columbia
- Country: Canada
- Province: British Columbia
- Region: Sunshine Coast
- Regional district: Sunshine Coast Regional District
- Location: Malibu Rapids, Princess Louisa Inlet, New Westminster Land District
- Elevation: 10 m (33 ft)
- Time zone: UTC-8 (PST)
- Waterways: Princess Louisa Inlet, Jervis Inlet

Malibu is a locality in the Canadian province of British Columbia's Sunshine Coast district. This place may also be referred to as Malibu Islet and Malibu Rapids. This was the site of the Malibu Club, formerly a private resort which is today a Young Life camp.

Malibu is at the mouth of the Princess Louisa Inlet and Swaywelat Sechelt Bands 12 and 12A. It is only accessible by boat or by seaplane.

== History ==
Thomas F. Hamilton began construction of the Malibu Club in 1940, named after his yacht, the MV Malibu. This was the first of a planned series of resorts throughout Princess Louisa Inlet. The club opened in July 1941, but its operations were suspended until the end of World War II in 1945. From that point until 1950, the facility was open as a premium resort. Visitors included John Wayne, Senator John F. Kennedy, Barbara Stanwyck, Bing Crosby, and Bob Hope. The club faced financial problems due to the limited transportation access and the limited two-month window of good weather. In 1948, a polio death and related quarantine further damaged business prospects. Hamilton's Malibu Club was closed in 1950.

Young Life, a Christian association, agreed to purchase the facilities from Hamilton in December 1953 and has operated the Malibu Club facility since. Hamilton had put a $1 million price tag on the property, but sold it to Jim Rayburn, the founder of Young Life, for $300,000 after visiting other Young Life camps in the area.

== Climate ==
Climate data for Malibu (1981–2010)
| Month | Jan | Feb | Mar | Apr | May | Jun | Jul | Aug | Sep | Oct | Nov | Dec | Year |
|---|---|---|---|---|---|---|---|---|---|---|---|---|---|
| Record high °C (°F) | 14.0 (57.2) | 12.5 (54.5) | 17.5 (63.5) | 26.5 (79.7) | 32.5 (90.5) | 33.5 (92.3) | 32.0 (89.6) | 35.0 (95.0) | 30.5 (86.9) | 23.0 (73.4) | 16.5 (61.7) | 12.5 (54.5) | 35.0 (95.0) |
| Mean daily maximum °C (°F) | 4.7 (40.5) | 6.2 (43.2) | 9.0 (48.2) | 13.0 (55.4) | 17.1 (62.8) | 20.0 (68.0) | 22.9 (73.2) | 23.2 (73.8) | 18.8 (65.8) | 12.2 (54.0) | 6.9 (44.4) | 4.3 (39.7) | 13.2 (55.8) |
| Daily mean °C (°F) | 3.1 (37.6) | 4.1 (39.4) | 6.2 (43.2) | 9.4 (48.9) | 13.1 (55.6) | 16.1 (61.0) | 18.8 (65.8) | 19.2 (66.6) | 15.4 (59.7) | 10.0 (50.0) | 5.2 (41.4) | 2.8 (37.0) | 10.3 (50.5) |
| Mean daily minimum °C (°F) | 1.6 (34.9) | 1.9 (35.4) | 3.5 (38.3) | 5.7 (42.3) | 9.0 (48.2) | 12.2 (54.0) | 14.5 (58.1) | 15.3 (59.5) | 11.8 (53.2) | 7.7 (45.9) | 3.5 (38.3) | 1.2 (34.2) | 7.3 (45.1) |
| Record low °C (°F) | −9.5 (14.9) | −11.0 (12.2) | −4.5 (23.9) | 0.0 (32.0) | 2.5 (36.5) | 5.6 (42.1) | 8.0 (46.4) | 9.4 (48.9) | 5.0 (41.0) | −4.0 (24.8) | −10.0 (14.0) | −13.5 (7.7) | −13.5 (7.7) |
| Average precipitation mm (inches) | 319.9 (12.59) | 224.7 (8.85) | 227.3 (8.95) | 179.1 (7.05) | 146.0 (5.75) | 122.3 (4.81) | 93.7 (3.69) | 91.1 (3.59) | 108.4 (4.27) | 289.4 (11.39) | 388.8 (15.31) | 303.2 (11.94) | 2,493.9 (98.19) |
| Average snowfall cm (inches) | 23.3 (9.2) | 14.2 (5.6) | 4.4 (1.7) | 0.9 (0.4) | 0.0 (0.0) | 0.0 (0.0) | 0.0 (0.0) | 0.0 (0.0) | 0.0 (0.0) | 0.1 (0.0) | 10.1 (4.0) | 27.0 (10.6) | 80 (31.5) |
| Average precipitation days (≥ 0.2 mm) | 21.3 | 16.7 | 20.1 | 18.6 | 17.6 | 15.7 | 11.8 | 10.6 | 11.5 | 18.5 | 22.2 | 19.7 | 204.3 |
| Average snowy days (≥ 0.2 cm) | 4.2 | 2.5 | 0.80 | 0.15 | 0.0 | 0.0 | 0.0 | 0.0 | 0.0 | 0.08 | 1.8 | 4.0 | 13.53 |
Source: Environment and Climate Change Canada
