= Queens Reach =

Arm of an inlet in British Columbia

- Location within British Columbia
- Location: British Columbia, Canada
- Coordinates: 50°09′24″N 123°52′24″W
- Part of: Jervis Inlet
- Max. length: 34 km (21 mi)
- Max. depth: 457 m (1,499 ft)

Queens Reach is the last arm of the Jervis Inlet and is located within the Coast Mountain Range of British Columbia, Canada. This arm was named during the 1860 survey by HMS Plumper which charted all of the area and was named after Queen Victoria of the United Kingdom.

== See also ==
- List of fjords in Canada
