= Lake George (Kings County, Nova Scotia) =

Lake in Nova Scotia, Canada

- Location within Nova Scotia
- Location: Kings County, Nova Scotia
- Coordinates: 44°55′26.9″N 64°41′21.9″W
- Basin countries: Canada
- Surface elevation: 223 m (732 ft)
- Islands: 6
- Settlements: Lake George

Lake George (Nova Scotia) is a lake of Kings County, Nova Scotia, Canada.

There is a Provincial Park beach area at the south end of the lake.

== See also ==
- List of lakes in Nova Scotia
- Lake George, Kings County, Nova Scotia
- Royal eponyms in Canada
