= Queen Elizabeth Secondary School =

Queen Elizabeth Secondary
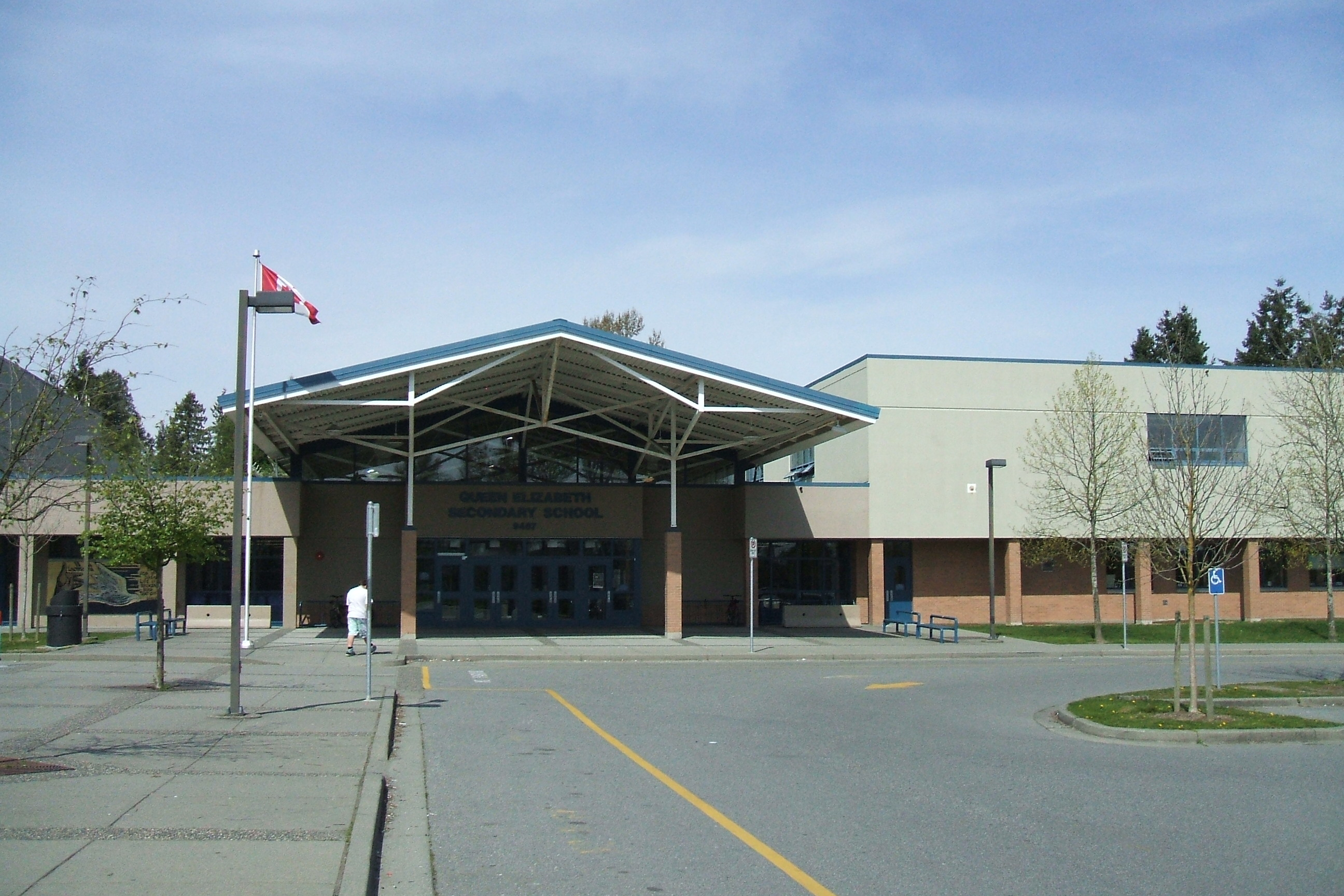

Location
- 9457 136 St; Surrey, British Columbia, V3V 5W4; Canada; 49.1744°N 122.8471°W

Information
- School type: Public, high school
- Motto: "Nomine Dignum" (Worthy of Thy Name)
- Established: 1940
- School board: Surrey School Board
- School number: 3636022
- Principal: Mr. Baljit Ranu
- Grades: 8-12
- Enrolment: ▲1,509 (2025)
- Language: English
- Colours: Blue , Gold and White
- Team name: Royals
- Website: www.surreyschools.ca/schools/queene/

Queen Elizabeth Secondary is a public high school in Surrey, British Columbia part of School District 36 Surrey. The school is named after Queen Elizabeth The Queen Mother, who first visited Canada in 1939. It was ranked 248 of 516 according to the Fraser Institute Studies in Education Policy in 2007–2008.

== History ==
=== Founding ===
Founded in 1940, Queen Elizabeth Secondary School was built to accommodate the influx of new residents from the opening of the Pattullo Bridge in 1937 and the completion of the King George Highway. It was built as a sister school to Semiahmoo Secondary, and the two were built with similar plans. It originally was made up of 14 classrooms, a gym, an industrial shop, and a library. In the 1950s as enrollment grew a science wing, an academic wing, an industrial wing and an additional gym were added. Many of the first teachers came over from Surrey High School. The opening of new junior high schools like William Beagle and Len Shepard shifted the lower grades, and by the fall of 1958 grade 9 was the lowest grade. The next year the school added a grade 13 program.

The science wing added in the expansion was late for the beginning of the school year, and was open only in shifts for the first two months. The grade 9s worked in the mornings and the grade 10s in the afternoons. The science wing also housed the industrial arts shop, which didn't open due to the late start. The woodwork and metalwork classes were held at Princess Margaret.

=== 1967 fire ===
In July 1967, QE suffered a fire that began in the science wing. That wing was completely destroyed and the original school building was so damaged it had to be demolished. The south academic wing, the industrial wing and the two gyms survived. The students continued their studies at Princess Margaret and North Surrey until the school reopened in November 1969. In 1969 the grade 13 program was removed.

=== Return to Secondary School ===
In the 1990s Board policy resulted in the restructuring of schools so that all secondary schools enrolled grades 8 to 12. William Beagle closed and the students were enrolled in Queen Elizabeth. West Whalley was closed and re-opened in 2002 as Kwantlen Park. Len Shepard, and the Inter-A leadership program, merged with KP, and the old building became the Surrey Traditional School. QE returned to its original 8-12 grade structure in 1999.

=== Inter-A ===
Due to overcrowding at Kwantlen Park, the Inter-A program shifted to QE at the start of the 2017-18 school year. It takes up the majority of the third floor on the C-wing, and has a science lab in the B-wing. Inter-A participates in school events with the rest of the students, and many volunteer to run and organize activities due to their leadership expertise

== Present ==
As of 2022, the QE school campus consists of a four-level main building, including the basement, and is supplemented by 13 portable classrooms to accommodate additional learning spaces. The school offers a wide range of facilities designed to support both academic and extracurricular activities. These include two gymnasiums for physical education and sports programs, a well-equipped library for research and independent learning, a theatre/drama room for performing arts, a cafeteria for students and staff, and an industrial arts wing that provides specialized spaces for hands-on technical education. In addition to its indoor facilities, the school features a variety of outdoor recreational areas, including two sports fields, a dedicated basketball court, and a multi-purpose court that can be used for both basketball and tennis, providing students with ample opportunities for physical activity, recreation, and organized sports.

== See also ==
- Royal eponyms in Canada
