= Lake George, Kings County, Nova Scotia =

Community in Nova Scotia, Canada

Coordinates: 44°54′46.92″N 64°41′31.07″W

Lake George in Nova Scotia

Lake George is a community in the Canadian province of Nova Scotia, located in Kings County.

Lake George is a Provincial Park beach area that is located 16 km south of Berwick opened from mid-May to mid-October.. The main attraction of Lake George is its 4.16 ha (10.28 acre) lake located and 125 North River Road, Lake George. The public freshwater sandy beach is lined with picnic tables, changing areas and parking for the public. The beach is ideal for boating, canoeing, kayaking and swimming. There are also cottages lined up alongside the whole lake which gives it a sense of community.

== See also ==
- Lake George (Kings County, Nova Scotia)
- Royal eponyms in Canada
