= Queen Elizabeth Pool =

Swimming pool in Edmonton, Alberta

Coordinates: 53°31′26″N 113°29′59″W

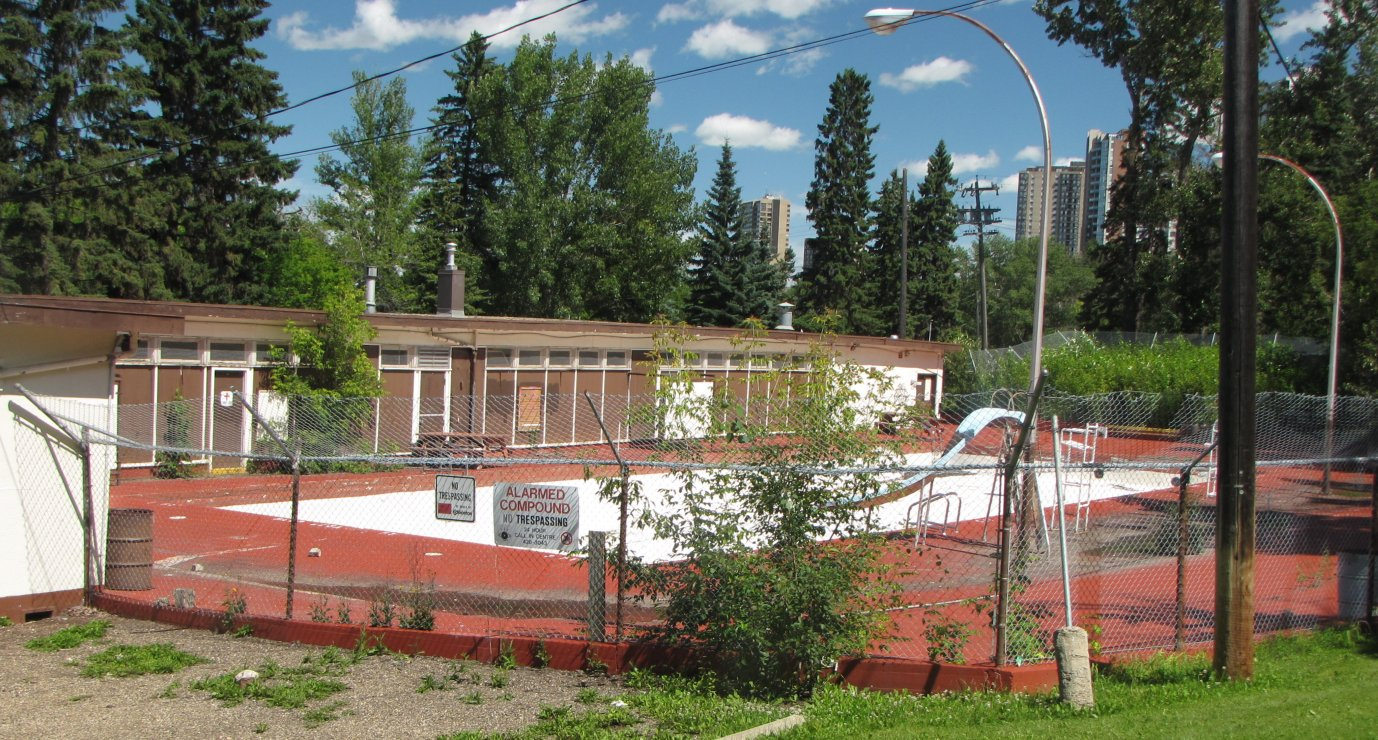
Queen Elizabeth Pool original site in 2011, shortly before demolition

The Queen Elizabeth Pool is an outdoor swimming pool on the south side of the North Saskatchewan River valley in Edmonton, Alberta, Canada. The original pool, which opened on August 22, 1922, was the oldest municipal pool in Western Canada. The Edmonton Bulletin described the pool as “delightfully situated in what is generally recognized as the city’s most beautiful park."

The pool was originally named the South Side Pool; it was renamed the Queen Elizabeth Pool during the 1939 royal tour of Canada when King George VI and Queen Elizabeth visited Edmonton. The pool cost $18,600 to build and was made of reinforced concrete, designed to minimize heaving due to frost.

In 1923, a municipal order was issued banning people of colour from using public pools in Edmonton, including the Queen Elizabeth Pool, but the order was revoked the following year in response to community advocacy.

Following the discovery of a crack in the pool's basin, the facility was closed in 2004. The original pool was demolished in the summer of 2011 and reopened later that same year 600 metres to the west, adjacent to the Kinsmen Sports Centre.

The new pool features a six-lane, 25-metre pool with a zero-depth entry, children's spray park, sun deck, universal access change room and showers and lockers on the pool deck.

== See also ==
- Royal eponyms in Canada
