= Prince of Wales Hotel (Niagara-on-the-Lake) =

Historic accommodations in Niagara-on-the-Lake

Coordinates: 43.25434°N 79.07071°W

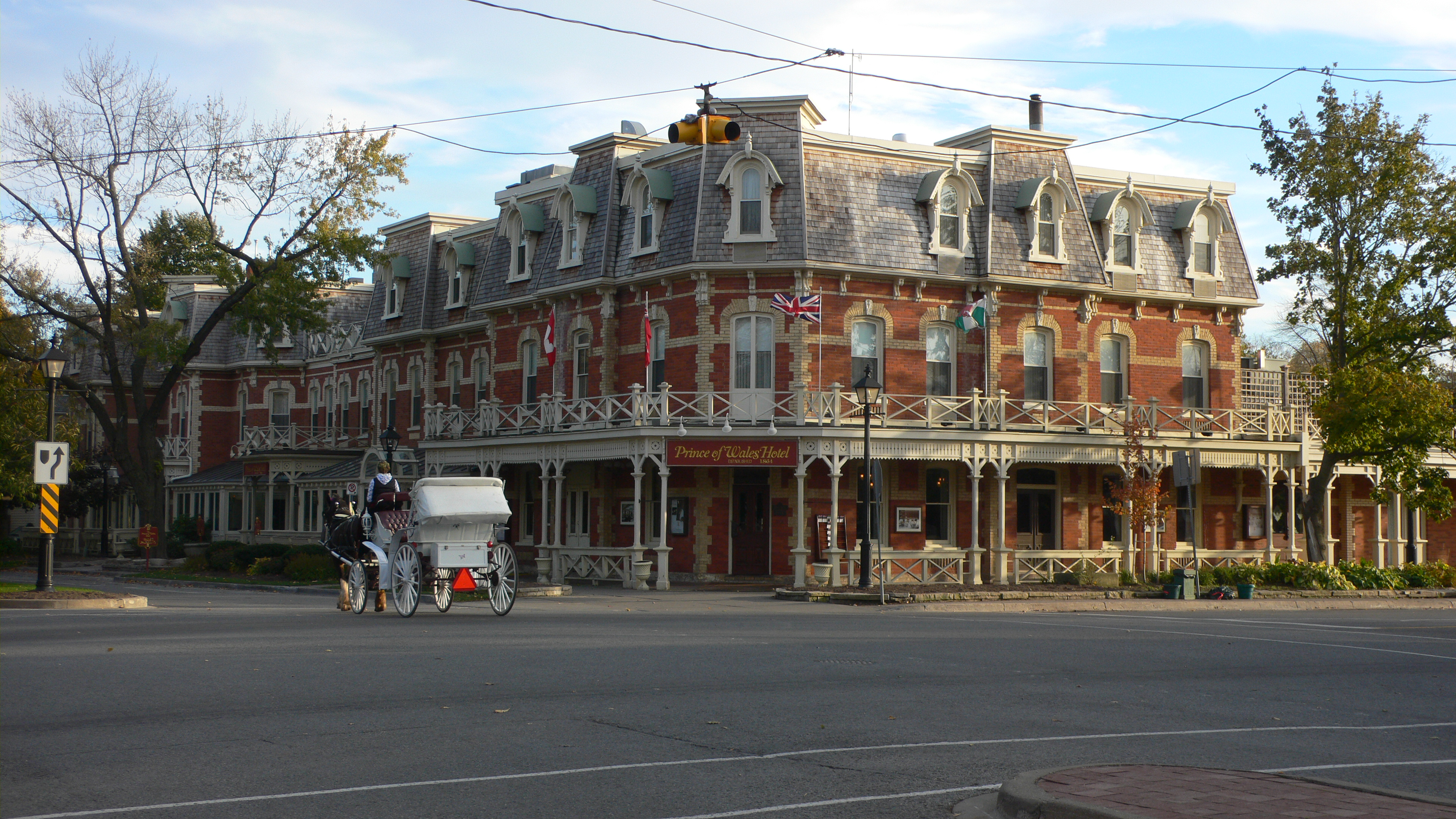
The Prince of Wales Hotel

Prince of Wales Hotel, Niagara-on-the-Lake is an historic Victorian hotel in Niagara-on-the-Lake, Ontario. It is located at King Street and Picton Street along the historic main street of Niagara-on-the-Lake, in its historic district.

Built in 1864, the three storey 110 room hotel went by several names (Long's Hotel, Arcade Hotel, The Niagara House) and was renamed with the current name in 1901 after royal guests The Duke and Duchess of Cornwall and York (afterwards known as The Prince and Princess of Wales until 1910) stayed.

Queen Elizabeth II stayed at the hotel during her visit to the area in 1973.

Built and owned by the Long family, the current building was acquired by Si Wan Lai. Lai renovated the hotel, now managed by Lais Hotel Properties Limited.

== See also ==
- Navy Hall
- Fort Niagara
- Fort George, Ontario
- Fort Mississauga
- Butler's Barracks
- Royal eponyms in Canada
