= Princess Royal Island (Nunavut) =

Island in Nunavut, Canada

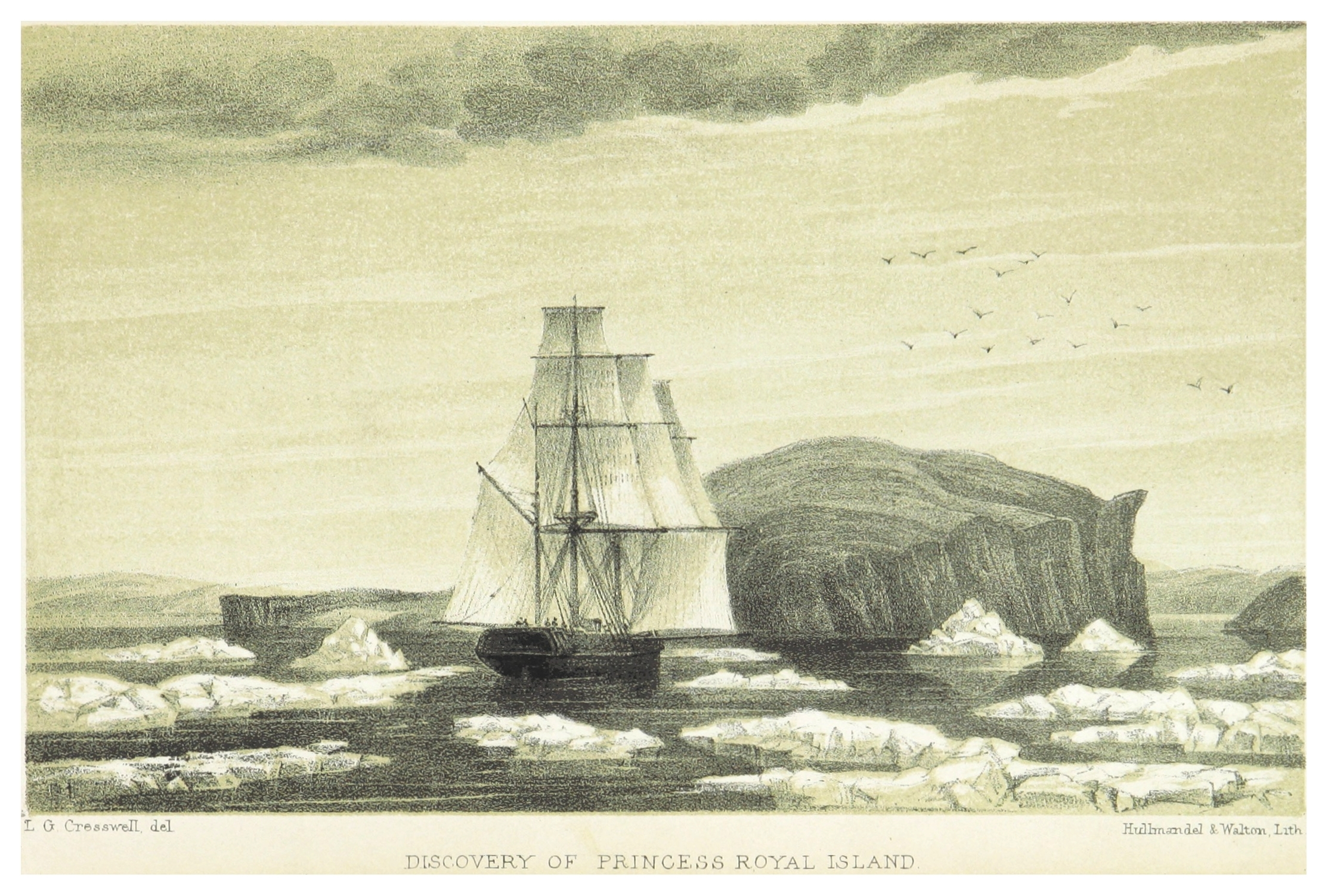
- Extracted image of the island from page 179 of The Discovery of the North-West Passage

- Location within Nunavut Location within Canada

Geography
- Location: Northern Canada
- Coordinates: 76°56′N 094°19′W
- Archipelago: Queen Elizabeth Islands; Arctic Archipelago
- Area: 11 km^{2} (4.2 sq mi)

Administration
- Canada
- Territory: Nunavut
- Region: Qikiqtaaluk

Demographics
- Population: Uninhabited

Princess Royal Island is an uninhabited island within the Arctic Archipelago in the territory of Nunavut. It lies in Norwegian Bay, approximately 3 km (1.9 mi) off the northeast coast of Devon Island.

== See also ==
- Royal eponyms in Canada
