= Victoria School (Saskatoon) =

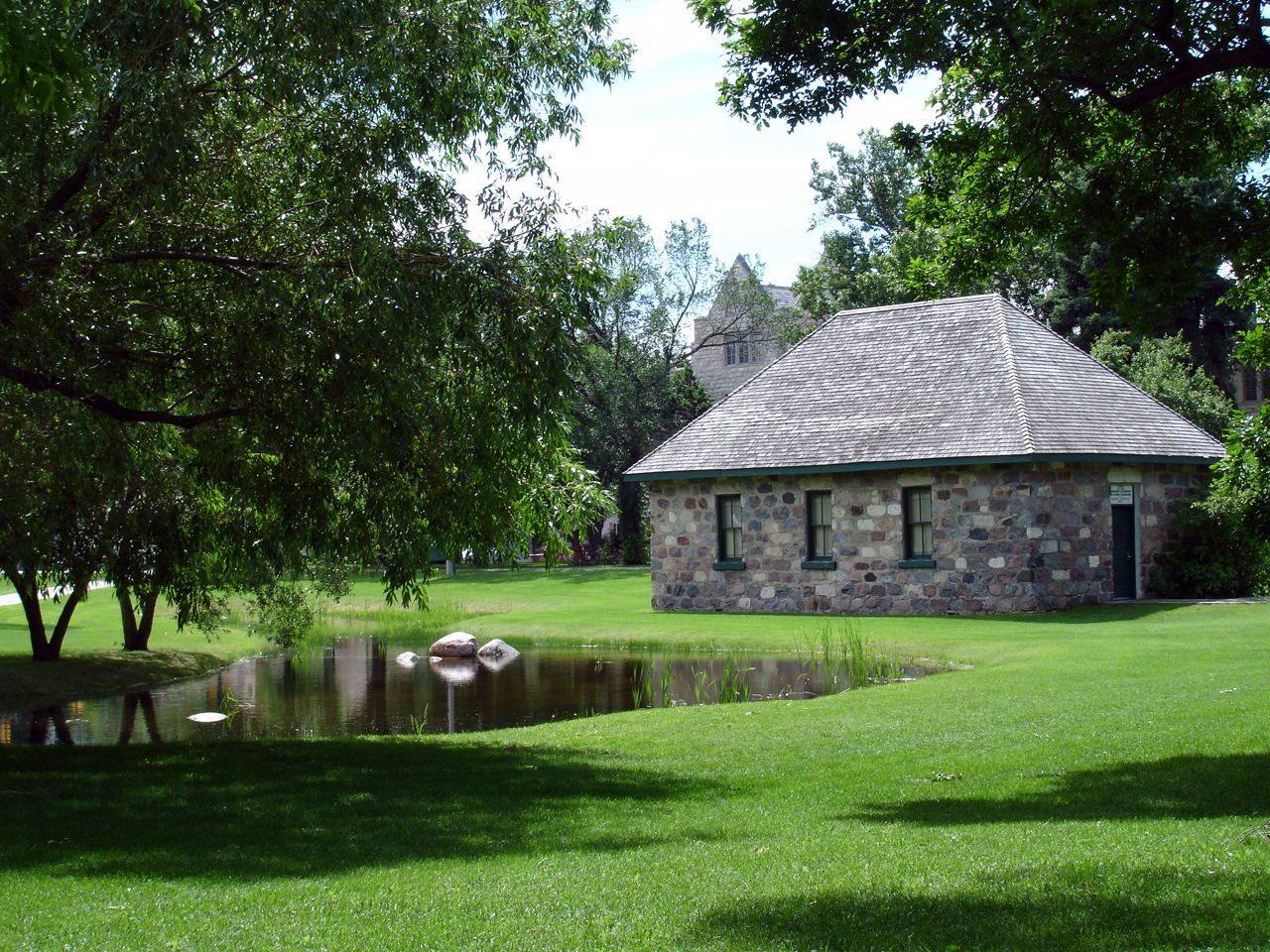
- Original Victoria School
- Interactive map of the Victoria School area

General information
- Type: One room schoolhouse
- Location: Saskatoon, Saskatchewan, Canada
- Coordinates: 52°7′46″N 106°38′27″W
- Construction started: 1888
- Completed: 1888

Design and construction
- Main contractor: Alexander Marr

Victoria School is the name given to three public schools in Saskatoon, Saskatchewan, Canada, one of which was the first permanent school constructed in the city.

== First and Second Victoria Schools ==
The original Victoria School is a designated historic building. The stone school house was built in 1888 by stonemason Alexander (Sandy) Marr as the first school house of the temperance colony that helped establish the city. Funding for the school was approved by the Saskatoon Board of Trustees in 1887, when the school board was authorized to borrow $1,200 for the purpose of building a one room school that could accommodate 40 pupils.

Originally at the "Five Corners" intersection at Broadway Avenue and 12th Street, in 1905, a two-room school was built beside it; it was also named Victoria School.

Both remained in concurrent use until a larger replacement Victoria School was built in 1909. Afterwards, the Imperial Order Daughters of the Empire undertook a project to relocate the original one-room schoolhouse to the University of Saskatchewan campus in 1911, in recognition of the coronation of George V (the two-room school was demolished). Once relocated to the campus, the building was used for storage until 1965, when the Saskatoon Council of Women undertook a project of restoring the school and opening it up to public tours.

== École Victoria School ==
The present-day École Victoria School was constructed in 1909. Originally known as Victoria School, for many years it offered both an English language program and a French immersion program, leading to it adopting a bilingual name. In the 2020-2021 school year the last of the English-only classes were moved to other schools and it became solely a French immersion school. Walter William LaChance was the architect for the building. The school is owned and operated by the Saskatoon Public School Division.

== See also ==
- Royal eponyms in Canada
