= King Edward Peak =

Mountain in British Columbia, Canada

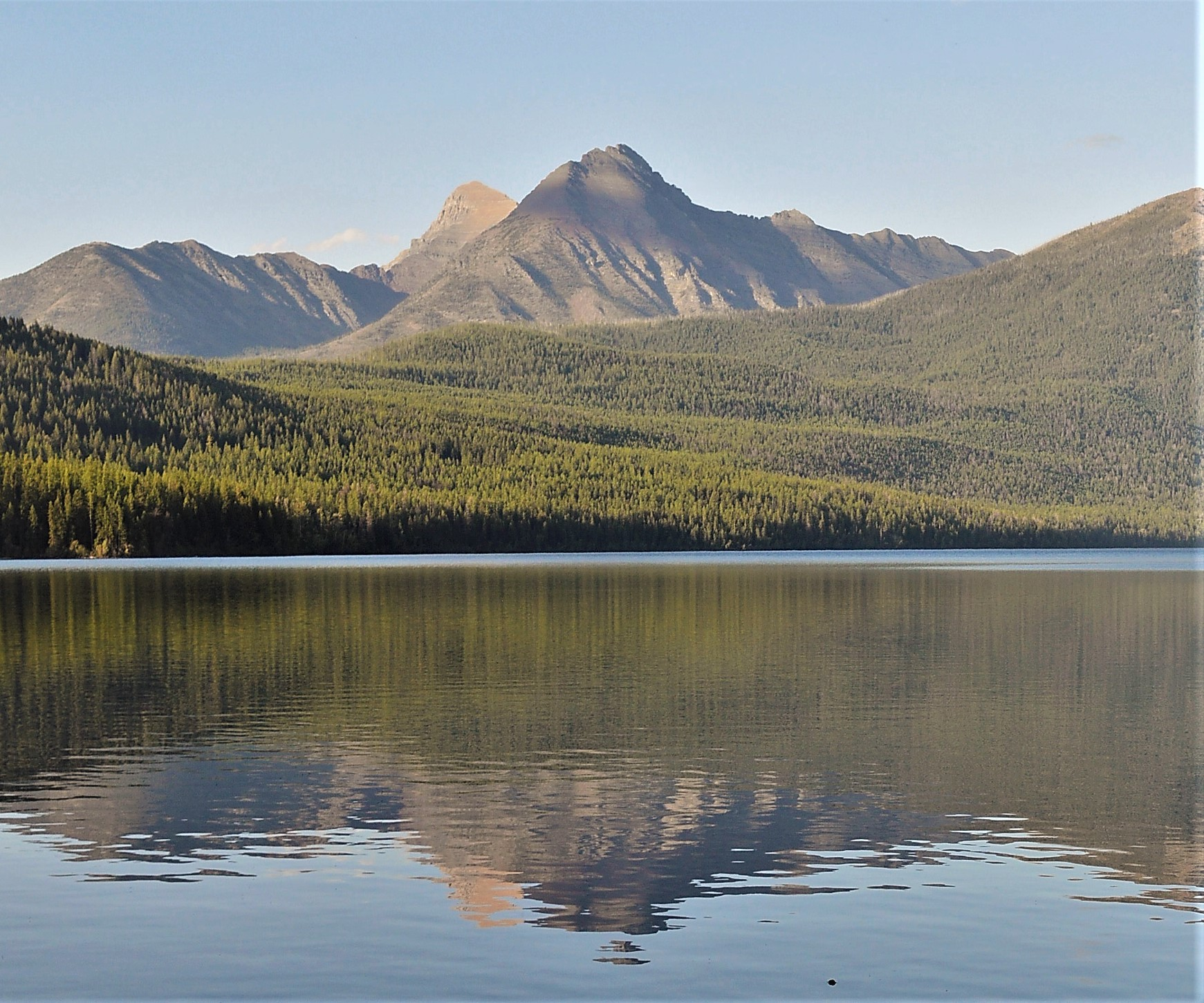
- King Edward Peak seen from Kintla Lake

Highest point
- Elevation: 2,789 m (9,150 ft)
- Prominence: 405 m (1,329 ft)
- Parent peak: Starvation Peak
- Listing: Mountains of British Columbia
- Coordinates: 49°01′28″N 114°16′12″W

Geography
- Location within British Columbia
- Location: British Columbia, Canada
- District: Kootenay Land District
- Parent range: Canadian Rockies
- Topo map: NTS 82G1 Sage Creek

King Edward Peak is a mountain located north of Starvation Creek and the U.S. border in British Columbia, Canada. The mountain was named in 1915 after King Edward VII.

King Edward Peak should not be confused with Mt. King Edward (3,490 m (11,450 ft)), located on the Continental Divide further north, although it too was named after King Edward.

== See also ==
- Royal eponyms in Canada
