= Mount King Edward =

Mountain in the country of Canada

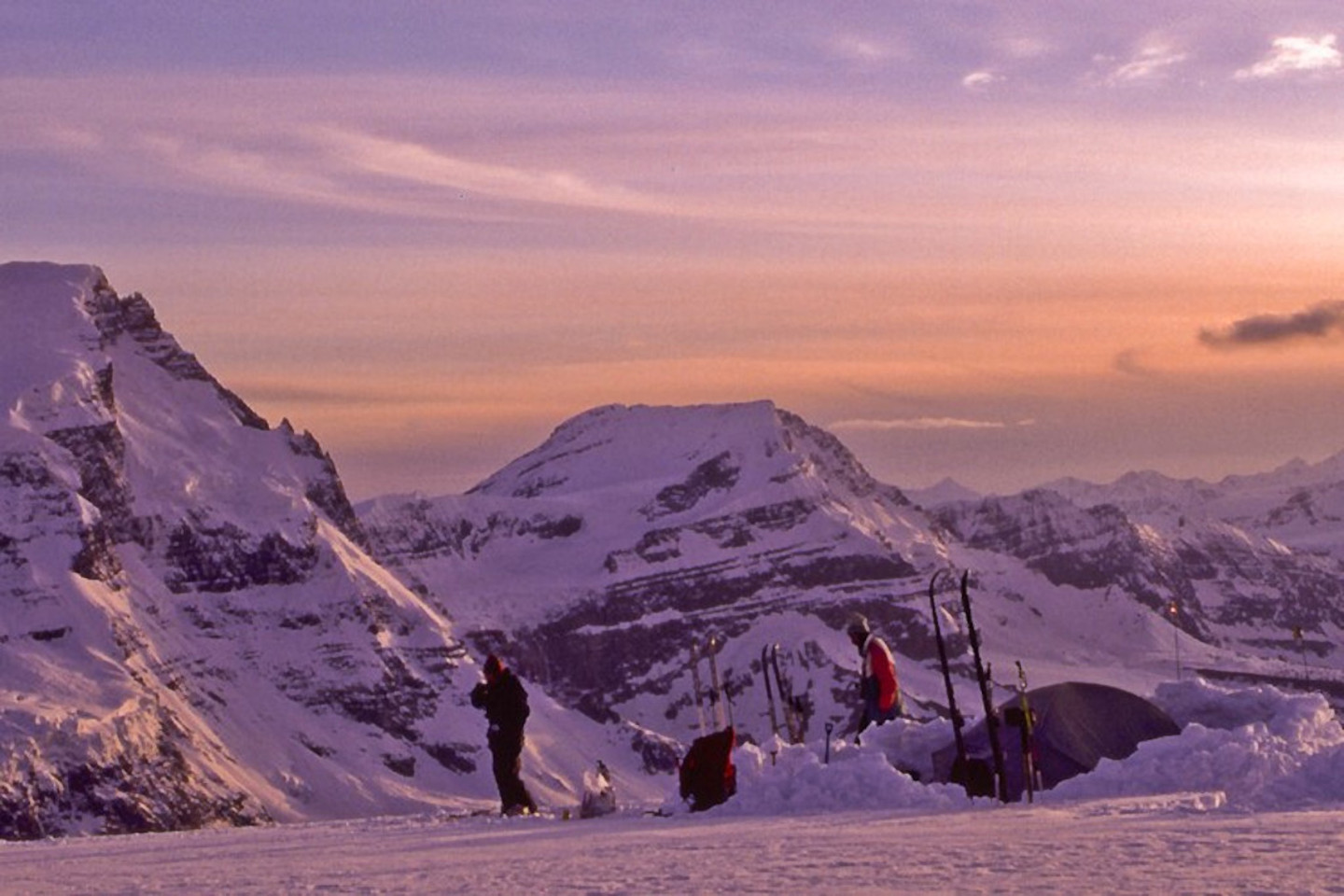
- Mt. King Edward, with Mt. Columbia at left

Highest point
- Elevation: 3,490 m (11,450 ft)
- Prominence: 770 m (2,530 ft)
- Listing: Mountains of Alberta; Mountains of British Columbia
- Coordinates: 52°09′23″N 117°31′10″W

Geography
- Location within Alberta Location within British Columbia Location within Canada
- Location: Alberta-British Columbia, Canada
- Parent range: Park Ranges ← Canadian Rockies
- Topo map: NTS 83C4 Clemenceau Icefield

Climbing
- First ascent: 1924 by J.W.A. Hickson, Howard Palmer, guided by Conrad Kain
- Easiest route: rock/snow climb

Mount King Edward is a mountain located at the head of the Athabasca River valley in Jasper National Park, Canada. Mt. King Edward is situated on the Continental Divide with Mt. Columbia 5 1/2 km (3.4 mi) east. The mountain was named in 1906 by Mary Schäffer Warren after King Edward VII.

Mt. King Edward should not be confused with King Edward Peak, 2,789 m (9,150 ft), just north of the US border, although it too was named after King Edward.

The mountain was first climbed in 1924 by J. W. A. Hickson, Howard Palmer, guided by Conrad Kain A. Carpe and H. Palmer made an attempt on the West face in 1920 but only managed to reached 10,800 ft (3,290 m).

== Gallery ==
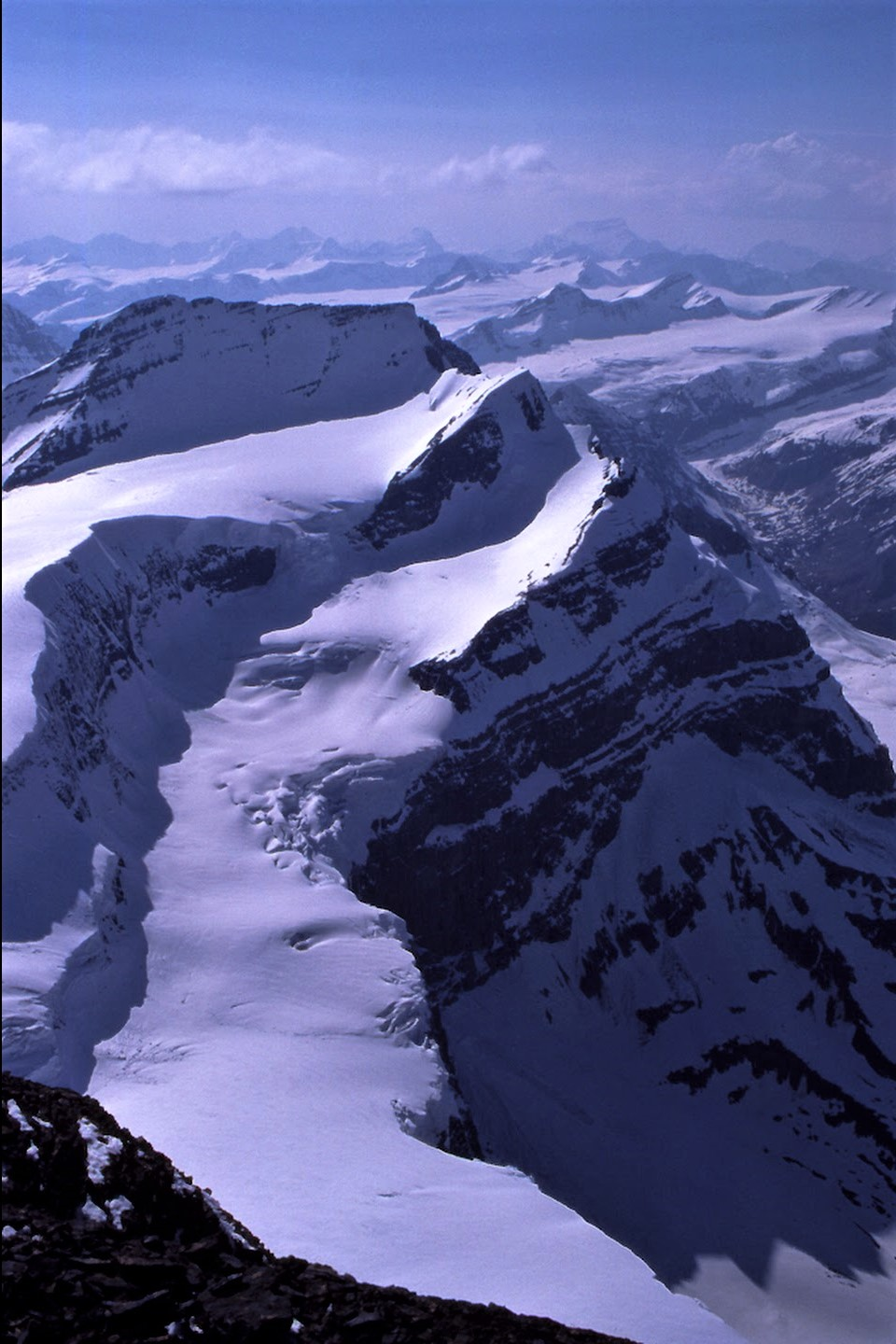
Mount King Edward from Mount Columbia's summit

== See also ==
- Royal eponyms in Canada
