= Victoria Hall (Hamilton) =

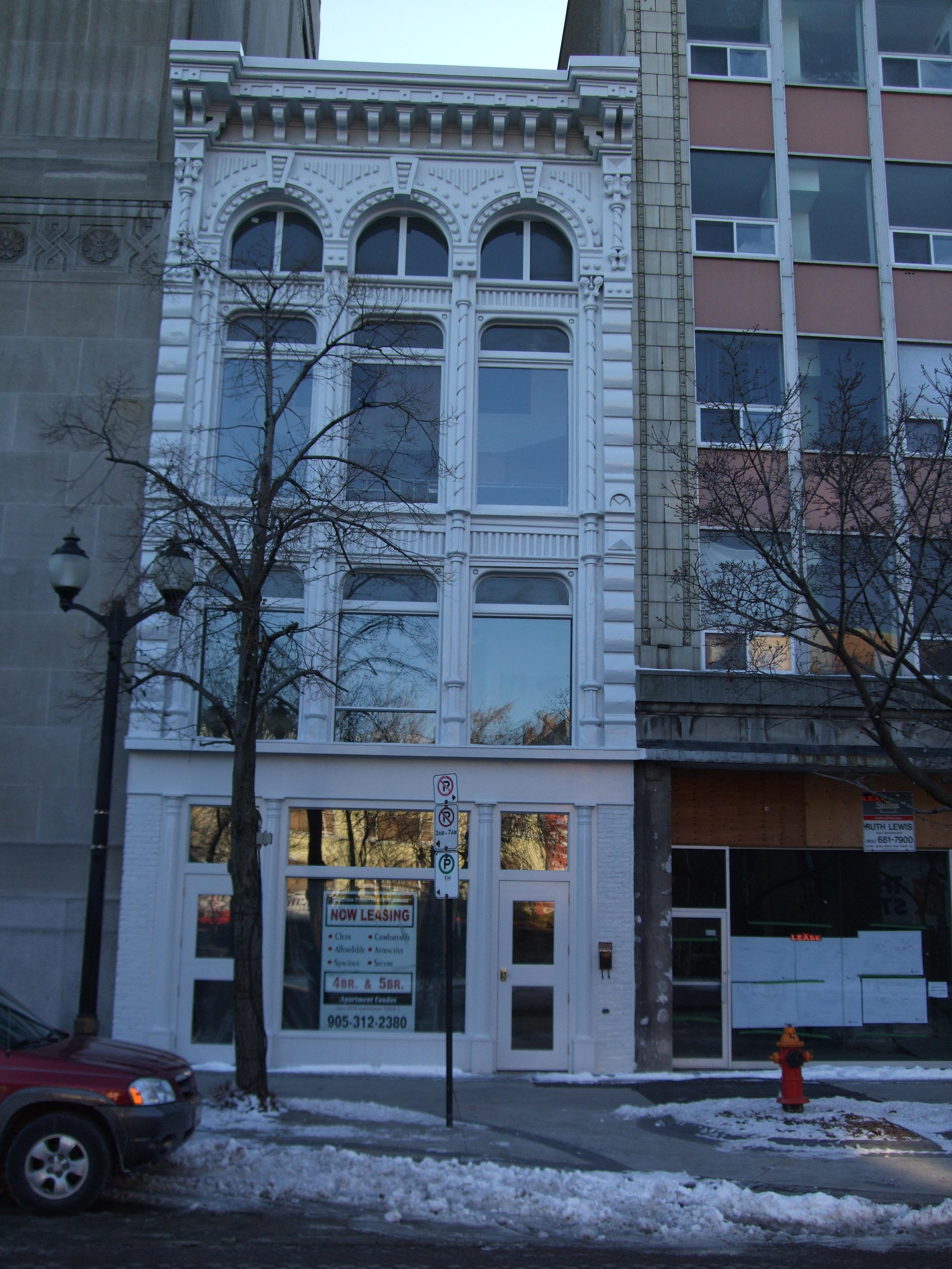
- Victoria Hall, 2009

- Location within Ontario
- Former names: "Fosters" (informal)

General information
- Type: Commercial Building
- Architectural style: Victorian
- Location: Hamilton, Ontario, 68 King Street East
- Coordinates: 43°15′20.5″N 79°52′02″W
- Construction started: 1887
- Completed: 1888

Design and construction
- Architect: William Stewart
- Awards: Designated under the Ontario Heritage Act, National Historic Site

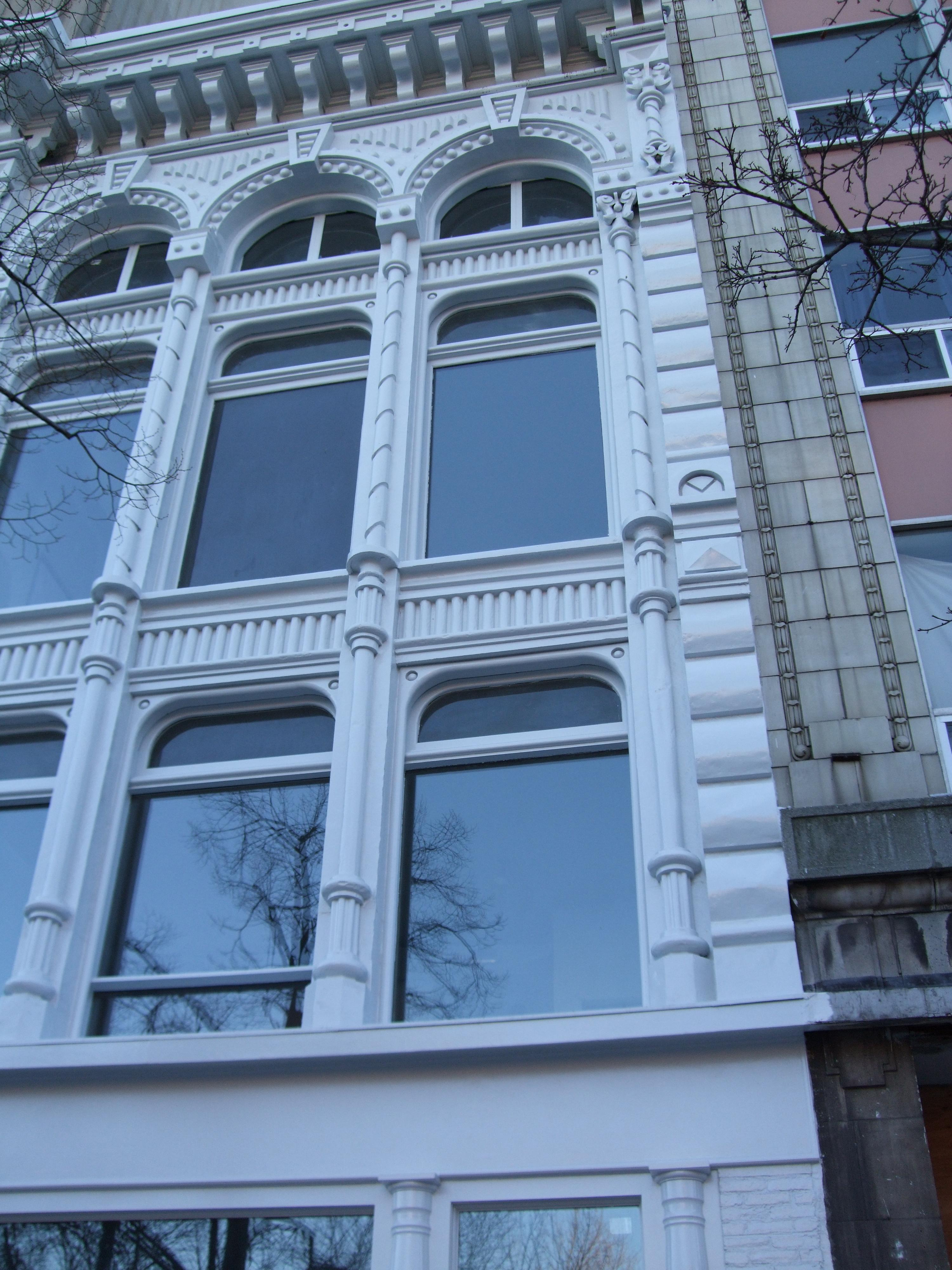
Victoria Hall, 2009

Victoria Hall is a former 3 1/2-storey commercial building in Hamilton, Ontario, Canada. Overlooking Gore Park, it is located in downtown Hamilton's central commercial district. For many years, the building (alongside the MacKay Building) was jointly known as the "Foster Building" due to its most recent use as a high-end clothing store. Some people still refer to Victoria Hall by this nickname today. It is a superior and rare example of a commercial building with a decorative architectonic sheet metal facade, which is completely hand-made. It was designated a National Historic Site in 1995.

Additionally, the building is an irreplaceable element in King Street's continuum of commercial architecture dating from the pre-Confederation era to the present and is likely one of the oldest surviving sheet metal facades in the country.

== History ==
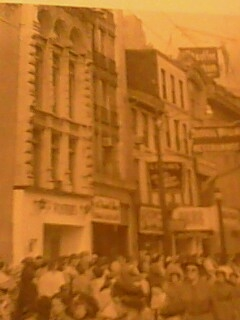
Victoria Hall, Early 1900s

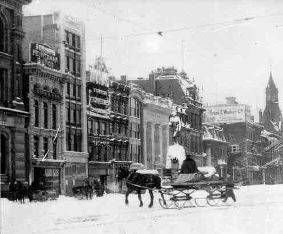
Victoria Hall, King Street West

Victoria Hall was built between 1887 and 1888. Designed by Hamilton architect William Stewart and erected for Alexander Bruce, a prominent Hamilton lawyer, the façade projects an image of prosperity by simulating the appearance of exuberant stone masonry.

Victoria Hall forms part of a continuous row of commercial buildings overlooking Gore Park, an area that has traditionally functioned as the city's commercial heart and the focal point of public events. Victoria Hall is among the last of the robust High Victorian commercial buildings in the Gore Park area.

For many years, the building was home to Gerhard Heintzman Pianos, A. Carey & Son Radio, J.H. Herring tea brokers, the Empire Newspaper, Canada Cycle Company and Bessie Brown Hats. A high-fashion women's store named Foster's moved into Victoria Hall in 1952 and about 10 years later it also took over the MacKay space next door. Since then, they've been treated as one property and apparently they even lean on each other. When the Jackson Square complex was constructed during the 1970s, Fosters abandoned Victoria Hall/McKay Building in 1979. Since then, Victoria Hall has remained the longest abandoned building in downtown Hamilton until recent renovations.

== Character Defining Elements ==
The key elements that relate to the heritage value of this site include:

- Its hand-crafted, sheet-metal facade, covering the entire front of the building above the ground floor;
- The well-proportioned, three-bay, Italianate composition of the metal facade, with architectural elements fabricated in high relief;
- On the lower two storeys, flat-arched windows with rounded corners separated by elongated columns, all framed by rusticated pilasters;
- On the top floor, semi-circular arched windows with highly decorated voussoirs and large keystones;
- A prominent, bracketed cornice capping the façade;
- Its successful simulation in galvanized sheet-metal of elaborately carved stone masonry;
- Its prominent and highly visible location on King Street near the corner of John Street;
- Its incorporation in a continuous row of commercial buildings along the south side of King Street;
- Its direct relationship to the open landscaped space of Gore Park on the opposite side of the street.

== Restoration ==
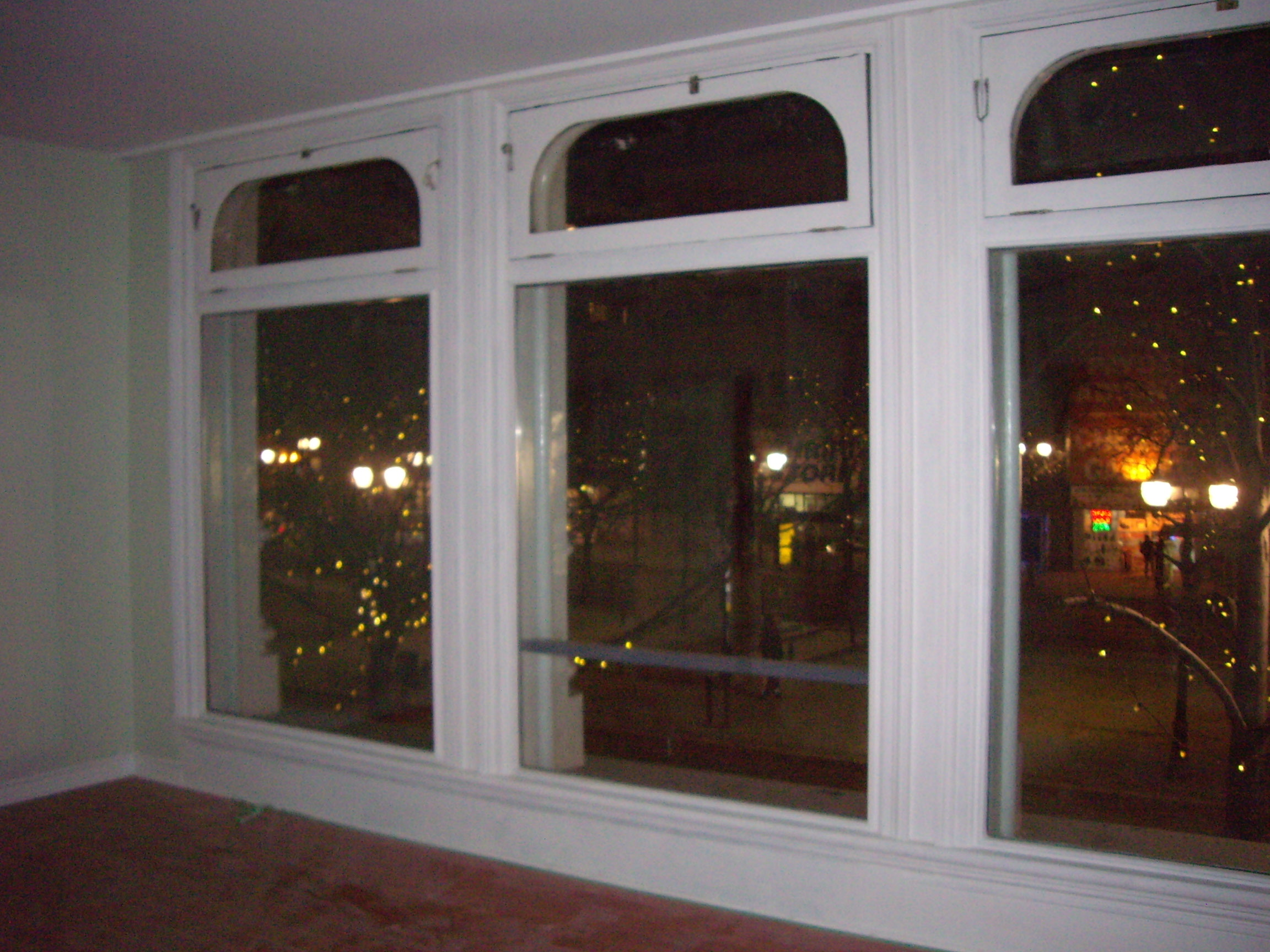
2nd Floor Living Room, North Elevation

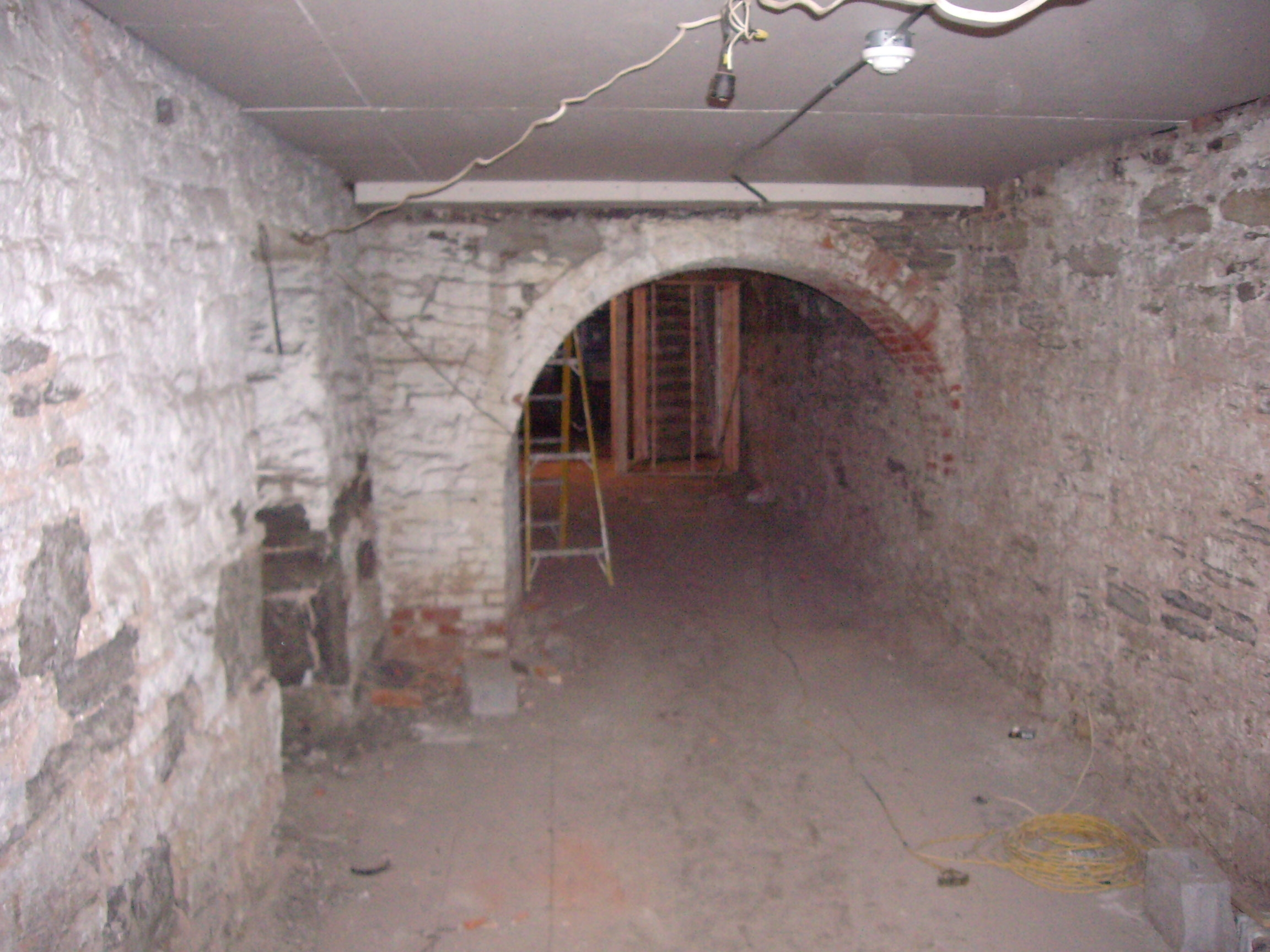
Stone / Brick Basement

After Fosters, a Willowdale dentist took ownership of the buildings. The dentist tried to sell them for $1.5 million, then half that, and still no takers. In the mid-1990s, the city came close to buying the property itself, but politicians were deterred by the state of deterioration. Years passed.

The property ended up with another owner who thought the properties should sell for millions. A Toronto real estate agent was going to be the savior, but again there was no progress.

Finally, the Victoria Hall-MacKay Building property was purchased in 2005 for $300,000 by out-of-town investors. They hired the Toronto engineering firm of Tran Dieu & Associates, which has come up with a $3 million plan that includes retail, office and 10 live-work spaces, popular in other cities.

The project qualified for about $300,000 in interest-free loans under the city's convert-to-residential program. Gordon Moodie (in charge of grants and loans for renewal projects in downtown Hamilton) worked with Tran Dieu on an application for something called the Commercial Heritage Properties Incentive Fund, which could give the Victoria Hall project a substantial kick-start.

In 2008, the Victoria Hall-MacKay Building property began renovations. The MacKay building consists of five, five bedroom apartments, roughly 2100 sq. feet. The 2nd and 3rd floor apartments took occupancy in September 2008. Victoria Hall consists of two apartments, one five bedroom (top floor with a 23-foot vaulted ceiling) and one four bedroom (2nd floor), and has since been repainted and polished to its original enamel white color evident in late-1800 photographs.

== National Historic Site designation ==
Victoria Hall was designated a National Historic Site in 1995 as a superior and rare example of a commercial building with a decorative, hand-made architectonic sheet metal facade. Victoria Hall's well-designed and well-crafted three-story metal facade, made up of high-relief architectural elements, was, at the time of designation, largely intact.

While this building was designated in 1995, a bilingual bronze plaque (which is the standard form of commemoration) has not been yet placed. Discussions about plaques are held between the owners of National Historic Sites and the appropriate Parks Canada Field Unit. Some buildings do not have plaques for many reasons: (i) Owners do not want them; (ii) the designation is too recent, or (iii) many recent commemorations in Ontario have created a backlog of requests for plaques. The number of unplaqued designations currently exceeds plaquing capacities.

== See also ==
- Royal eponyms in Canada
