= Victoria and Albert Mountains =

Mountain range on Ellesmere Island, Nunavut, Canada

The Victoria and Albert Mountains (80°30′N 74°8′W) are a mountain range running on the east coast of Ellesmere Island, Nunavut, Canada. The range is one of the most northern ranges in the world and of the Arctic Cordillera. The highest mountain in the range is Agassiz Ice Cap Summit at 2,201 m (7,221 ft). The range has an area of 37,650 km^{2} (14,540 sq mi).

In May and June 1981, a team of climbers made the first ascents of seventeen peaks in this range.

== See also ==
- List of mountain ranges
- Royal eponyms in Canada
