= Victoria Harbour, Nova Scotia =

Community in Nova Scotia, Canada

Coordinates: 45°07′58″N 64°26′08″W

Victoria Harbour in Nova Scotia

Victoria Harbour is a community in the Canadian province of Nova Scotia, located in Kings County. The community is named after Queen Victoria.

== See also ==
- Royal eponyms in Canada
