= King George VI Provincial Park =

Canadian provincial park

- IUCN category III (natural monument or feature)
- Location within British Columbia
- Interactive map of King George VI Provincial Park
- Location: Kootenay Boundary, British Columbia, Canada
- Nearest city: Rossland
- Coordinates: 49°01′00″N 117°49′00″W
- Area: 161.88 ha (400.0 acres)
- Established: May 3, 1937
- Governing body: BC Parks

King George VI Provincial Park is a provincial park in British Columbia, Canada. It was established by Order in Council on May 3, 1937, named in commemoration of the coronation of George VI. 162 acres (0.66 km^{2}) in area, the park was originally established to provide a rest area and campground for travellers on BC Hwy 22 entering Canada from the United States, the site's facilities were repeatedly vandalized until they were finally removed by BC Parks and the site left to revert to its natural state. There are no facilities in this park, nor any trails. The park's stands of old-growth Populus trichocarpa (black cottonwood) shelter it from neighbouring mixed-use areas and serve as habitat for cavity nesting birds, such as barred owls, pileated woodpeckers and red-naped sapsuckers.

== See also ==
- Monarchy in British Columbia
- Royal eponyms in Canada
