= Queen's Platinum Jubilee Gardens =

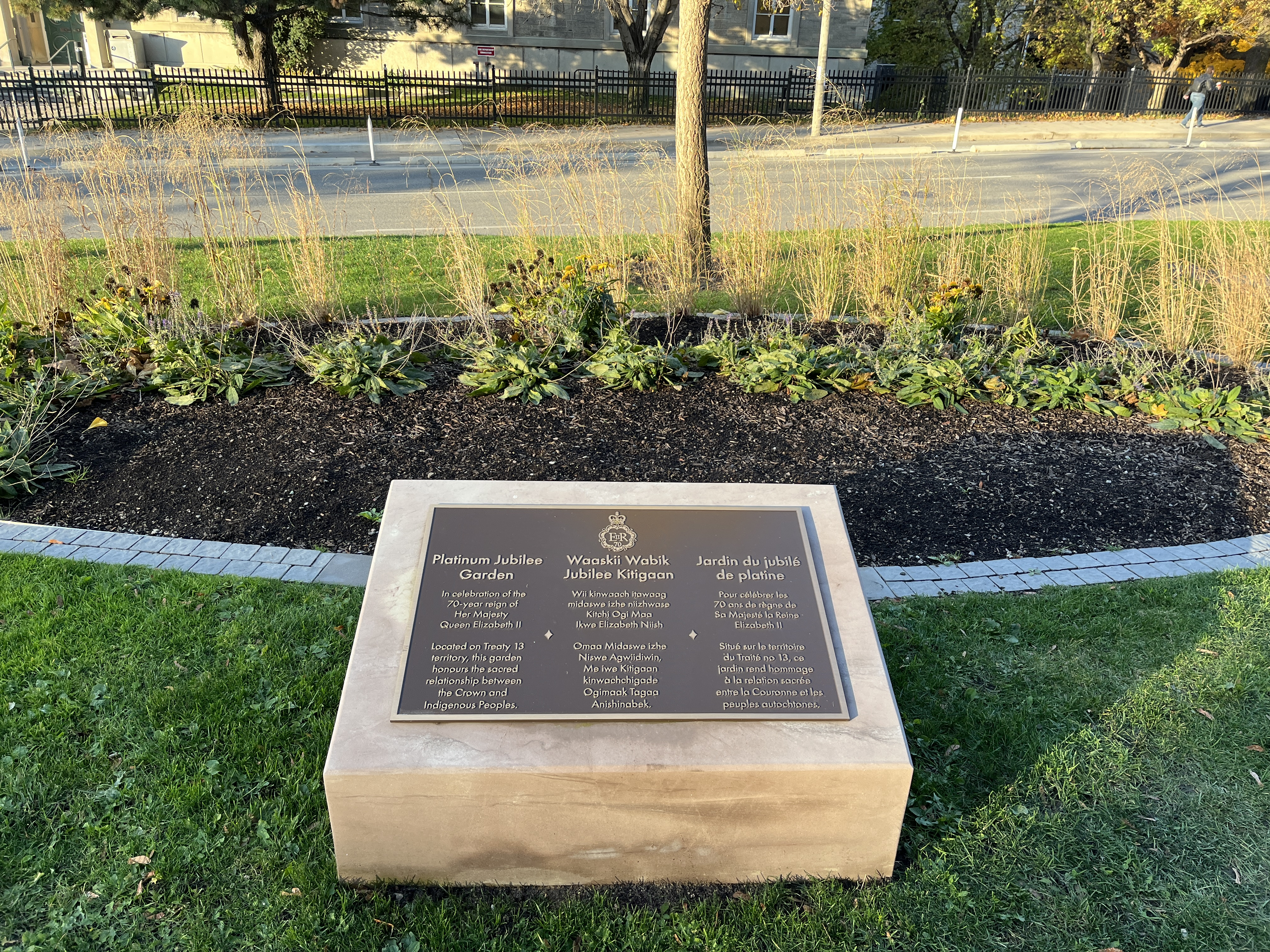
The Queen's Platinum Jubilee Gardens planted at Queen's Park in Toronto

To mark the Platinum Jubilee of Elizabeth II's accession as Queen of Canada, lieutenant governors and territorial commissioners across the country dedicated specially-created gardens in their respective province or territory. Each of the 13 gardens include plants suited to the local climate, tobacco being commonly incorporated to represent the relationship between Canada's Crown and Indigenous peoples. The tobacco seeds were drawn from plants grown for the chapel royal in Toronto.

== Provinces ==
=== New Brunswick ===
The Platinum Jubilee Garden was officially opened on June 26, in the grounds of Government House in Fredericton. Lieutenant Governor Brenda Murphy said the garden, "will serve as a living tribute to Her Majesty, where New Brunswickers can reflect upon her unprecedented reign".

=== Ontario ===
On September 30, Elizabeth Dowdeswell, Lieutenant Governor of Ontario, unveiled the Platinum Jubilee Garden on the grounds of the Legislative Building in Queen's Park. It was designed in partnership with Elder Carolyn King, of the Mississaugas of the Credit First Nation, and tobacco plants place a special focus on the relationship between the Crown and Indigenous Peoples. It also features the first plaque in Queen's Park to recognize Treaty 13 territory and include an Indigenous language. The stone border of the garden also features four Moccasin Identifiers.

=== Prince Edward Island ===
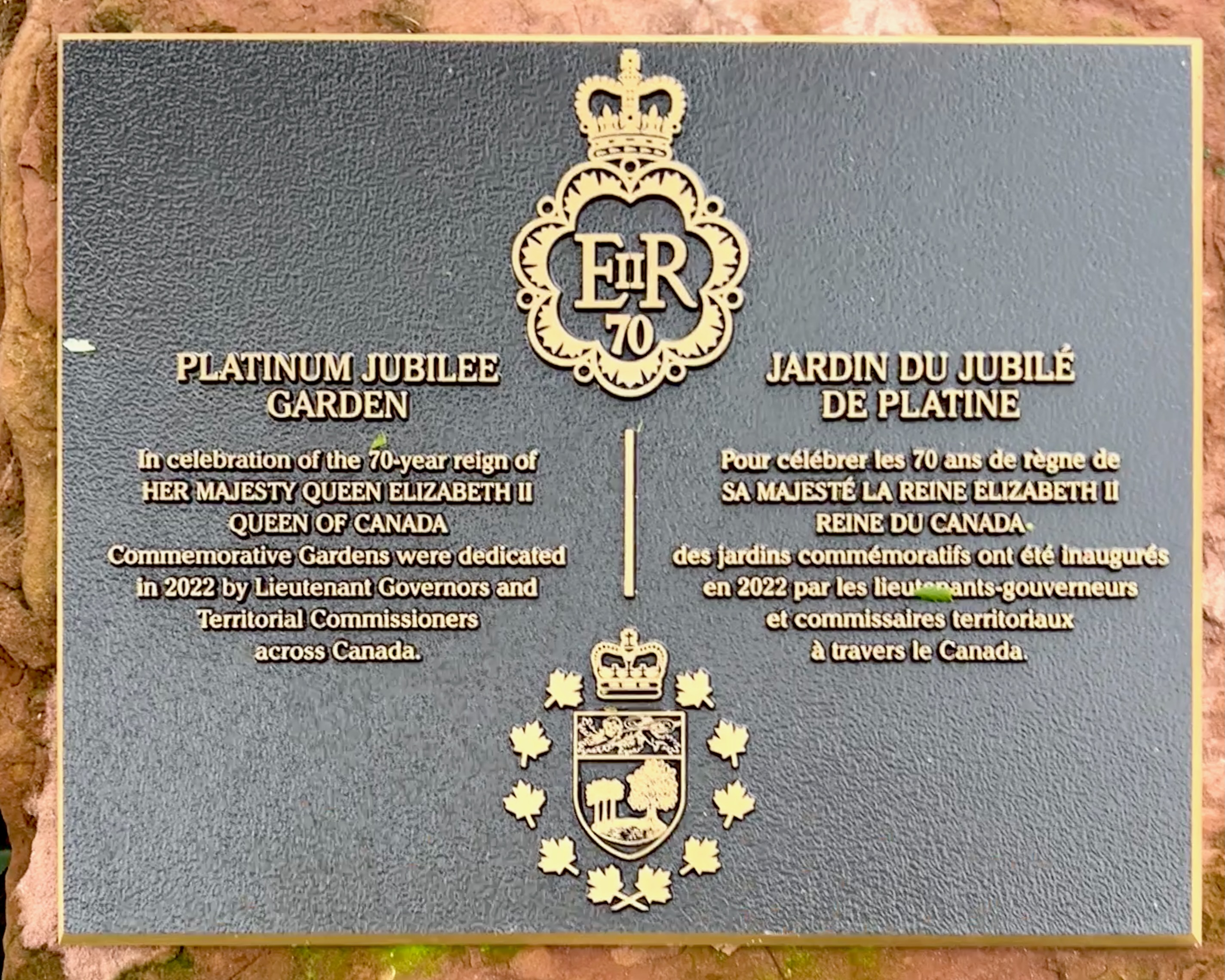
The plaque for Prince Edward Island's Platinum Jubilee Garden on the grounds of Government House in Charlottetown

Prince Edward Island's Platinum Jubilee Garden was unveiled by Lieutenant Governor Antoinette Perry at Government House in Charlottetown, on June 2, 2022. The garden includes a special tulip created for the Queen's Diamond Jubilee in 2012, plants native to the island, flowers representing the first groups to settle in the province—lavender for the English and French and thistle for the Scottish and Irish. Ceremonial tobacco was also included to honour the Mi'kmaq people.

Perry, who personally oversaw the garden's design, said she was "so happy to have honoured Her Majesty's Platinum Jubilee in this way [...] I can just see her sitting on the bench admiring the beauty of this garden and treasuring it, because she does love Prince Edward Island. I know that, she told me that".

=== Saskatchewan ===
Saskatchewan's Platinum Jubilee Garden, adjacent to the northwest lawn in the Edwardian Gardens, on the grounds of Government House, Regina, was unveiled by Lieutenant Governor Russ Mirasty on July 19, 2022. Mirasty ceremonially planted a tobacco plant.

The garden is circular, enclosed with a pasture sage hedge, and incorporates benches and signage focusing on reconciliation. At the centre is the Queen Elizabeth rose and, recognizing the ties between the Crown and Indigenous peoples, also includes tobacco plants, as well as flora native to the province, such as Labrador tea, prairie smoke, common yarrow, and western silvery aster. The Provincial Capital Commission staff and members of the Heritage Conservation Branch of the Ministry of Parks, Culture and Sport helped develop the garden.

== Territories ==
=== Northwest Territories ===
The Northwest Territories Platinum Jubilee Garden is located on the grounds of Joint Task Force North in Yellowknife.

=== Nunavut ===
The Platinum Jubilee Garden in Nunavut was dedicated by Commissioner Eva Qamaniq Aariak at the Legislative Building of Nunavut in Iqaluit on July 9. The flower boxes on the grounds of the assembly contain local wildflowers. Aariak called them "a living tribute to Her Majesty, who has reigned with dignity, respect, and caring compassion".

=== Yukon ===
In Yukon, the Platinum Jubilee Garden was unveiled at Taylor House on June 22, in partnership with Kwanlin Dün First Nation and Ta'an Kwäch'än Council.

== See also ==
- Royal eponyms in Canada
