= Queen Alexandra, Edmonton =

Queen Alexandra
- Neighbourhood
- Location of Queen Alexandra in Edmonton
- Coordinates: 53.513°N 113.507°W
- Country: Canada
- Province: Alberta
- City: Edmonton
- Quadrant: NW
- Ward: papastew
- Sector: Mature area
- Area: Strathcona

Government
  - Administrative body: Edmonton City Council
  - Councillor: Michael Janz

Area
  - Total: 1.23 km^{2} (0.47 sq mi)
- Elevation: 671 m (2,201 ft)

Population (2012)
  - Total: 4,694
  - Density: 3,816.3/km^{2} (9,884/sq mi)
  - Change (2009–12): ▲1.3%
  - Dwellings: 3,275

Queen Alexandra is a mixed residential and commercial neighbourhood in south west Edmonton, Alberta, Canada. The neighbourhood, once part of the City of Strathcona, is named for Alexandra of Denmark. The north edge of the neighbourhood, along Whyte Avenue is part of Old Strathcona, a popular commercial and cultural area of Edmonton.

The neighbourhood is bounded on the north by Whyte Avenue, on the west by 109 Street, on the east by 104 Street, and on the south by 70 Avenue.

The University of Alberta campus is located a short distance to the west of the neighbourhood. Access to the downtown core is north along both 109 Street and 104 Street.

The community is represented by the Queen Alexandra Community League, established in 1962, which maintains a community hall located at 104 Street and University Avenue.

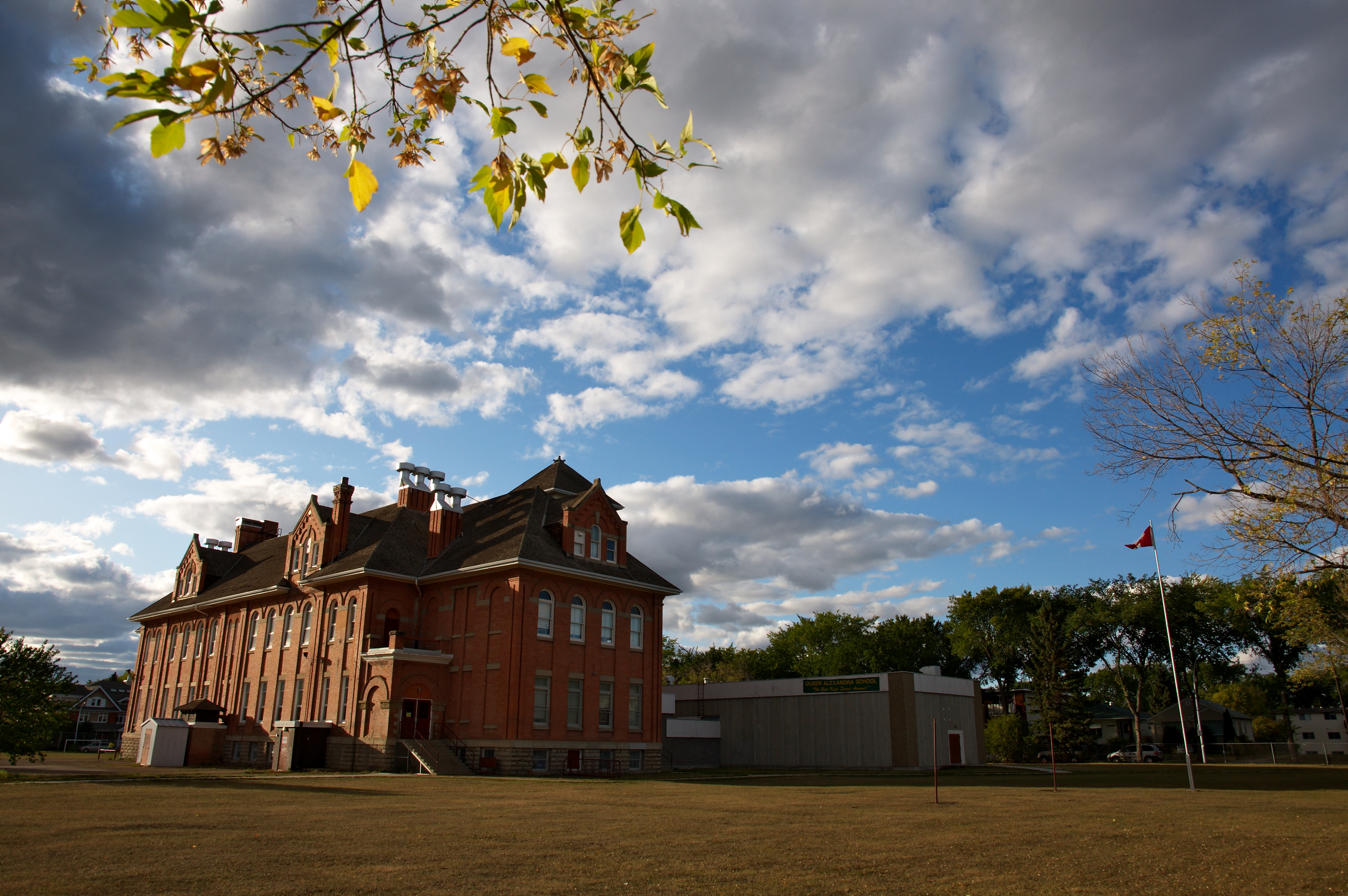
Queen Alexandra Elementary School

== Demographics ==
In the City of Edmonton's 2012 municipal census, Queen Alexandra had a population of 4,694 living in 3,275 dwellings, a 1.3% change from its 2009 population of 4,632. With a land area of 1.23 km^{2} (0.47 sq mi), it had a population density of 3,816.3 people/km^{2} in 2012.

== Residential development ==
Queen Alexandra is an older Edmonton neighbourhood with residential development beginning with the establishment of the City of Strathcona.

According to the 2001 federal census, approximately one in seven (15.6%) of all residences were built before the end of World War II. One in five (20.8%) were built between the end of the war and 1960. Another one in five (19.7%) residences were built during the 1960s. Indicating some redevelopment in the neighbourhood, one in three (31.9%) of all residences were built during the 1970s. Only one in eight (12.1%) of all residences were constructed after 1980.

According to the 2005 municipal census, the most common type of residence in the neighbourhood are rented apartments. Just over half (51%) of all residences are apartments in low-rise buildings with fewer than five stories while almost one in ten (8%) are apartments in high-rise buildings with five or more stories. One in three (31%) of all residences are single-family dwellings. Seven percent are duplexes while 3% are collective residences. Four out of every five (80%) residences are rented with only on residence in five (20%) being owner occupied.

== Population mobility ==
The neighbourhood population is highly mobile. According to the 2005 municipal census, one resident in three (33.2%) had moved within the previous twelve months. Another three in ten (27.9%) had moved within the previous one to three years. Only one resident in four (26.6%) had lived at the same address for five years or more.

== Schools and recreation ==
Tipton Park, between 80 and 81 Ave at 109th St

There are four schools in the neighbourhood. Four are operated by the Edmonton Public School System while one is operated by the Edmonton Catholic School System.

- Edmonton Public Schools
  - Duggan Street/Queen Alex School
  - Queen Alexandra Elementary School/Springhill Community Preschool
  - Strathcona Composite High School
- Edmonton Catholic Schools
  - Our Lady of Mount Carmel Catholic Elementary Junior High School

There are also several recreation facilities located in the neighbourhood.

- Rollie Miles Athletic Field
- South Side Arena
- Southside Athletic Grounds
- Strathcona Leisure Centre
- Tipton Park and Arena

A short distance to the east of the neighbourhood is Edmonton's Mill Creek Ravine, a popular outdoor recreation destination.

== See also ==
- Edmonton Federation of Community Leagues
- Royal eponyms in Canada
