= Victoria Provincial Park =

Park in Prince Edward Island, Canada

Coordinates: 46.20992°N 63.48208°W

Victoria Provincial Park is a day use park area with a beach located east of Victoria, Prince Edward Island, Canada. Contrary to the name, it is not a provincial park.

== See also ==
- Royal eponyms in Canada
