= Port George, Nova Scotia =

Port George
- Community
- Port George Historic Lighthouse

- Location of Port George in Nova Scotia
- Coordinates: 45°0′13.14″N 65°9′29.5″W
- Country: Canada
- Province: Nova Scotia
- County: Annapolis County
- Founded: 1812

Government
  - Governing body: Annapolis County
- Time zone: UTC-4 (ATS)
  - Summer (DST): UTC-3 (Atlantic Daylight Saving Time)
- Postal code: B0S 1P0
- Area code: 902

Port George is a scenic seaside community located in Annapolis County, Nova Scotia (Mi'kma'ki). Situated on the rugged shores of the Bay of Fundy (Bakudabakek), the village sits precisely on the 45th parallel north, approximately 11 km north of Middleton and just across North Mountain (Nova Scotia).

The community was originally known to the Mi'kmaq as Kulwaqwapsku'jk (meaning "Little Hooded Seal Rock") after a rock outcropping which attracted basking seals. This made the cove a regular summer encampment for the Mi'kmaq people, a presence which continued into the 20th century.

== European Settlement ==
The area was first settled by the English with land grants in 1760. It was later re-settled in 1812 and named in honour of King George III.

Port George became a bustling commercial hub during the 19th century. The community operated a shipyard and maintained a high volume of sea trade, exporting timber and agricultural produce to Boston and Saint John, New Brunswick.

The village also holds a place in maritime history through its connection to Joshua Slocum, the first person to sail solo around the world. Slocum grew up in the neighbouring community of Mount Hanley and began his legendary career sailing schooners out of Port George and Cottage Cove.

== Historic Landmarks ==
The community's skyline is defined by two historic structures:

- The Port George Lighthouse: Built in 1889, this "pepperpot-style" lighthouse serves as a vital navigational aid. It is unique for its fixed red light, which guides local seafarers. Originally located at the end of a wharf, the structure was moved to its current roadside position in the 1930s following severe storm damage. It remains community-owned and was most recently renovated in 2024.
- The United Baptist Church: Constructed in 1887, this building is famous for its distinctive steeple. While it no longer holds services and has been converted into a private residence, it remains a distinct local landmark.

Port George Old United Baptist Church

== Present-Day Port George ==
Today, Port George is a popular summer leisure destination.

- Cottage Cove Provincial Picnic Park: This 0.5-hectare park offers visitors a clear view of a resident seal colony on Dunn’s Rock. The park includes a Mi'kmaq burial ground found during a temporary closure in 1999 which includes the graves of nine children who died in a diphtheria epidemic in the early 20th century. A memorial to the graves was later erected in the park by the Mi'kmaq Burial Ground Research and Restoration Association.
- Maritime Access: The community features a modern concrete boat ramp—one of the few available along this specific stretch of the Fundy coastline.
- The Country Music Jamboree: The village is famous for its annual Country Music Jamboree, typically held on the last Saturday of July. A major regional event, the 38th jamboree in 2023 saw significant attendance, continuing a tradition that has spanned nearly four decades.

== See also ==
- Royal eponyms in Canada
