= Prince Albert, Nova Scotia =

Community in Nova Scotia, Canada

Coordinates: 45°0′0.04″N 65°3′20.57″W

Prince Albert in Nova Scotia

Prince Albert is a community in the Canadian province of Nova Scotia, located on North Mountain in Annapolis County. It is probably named after Prince Albert of Saxe-Coburg and Gotha, royal consort of Queen Victoria.

== See also ==
- Royal eponyms in Canada
