= Queen Elizabeth Elementary School (Vancouver) =

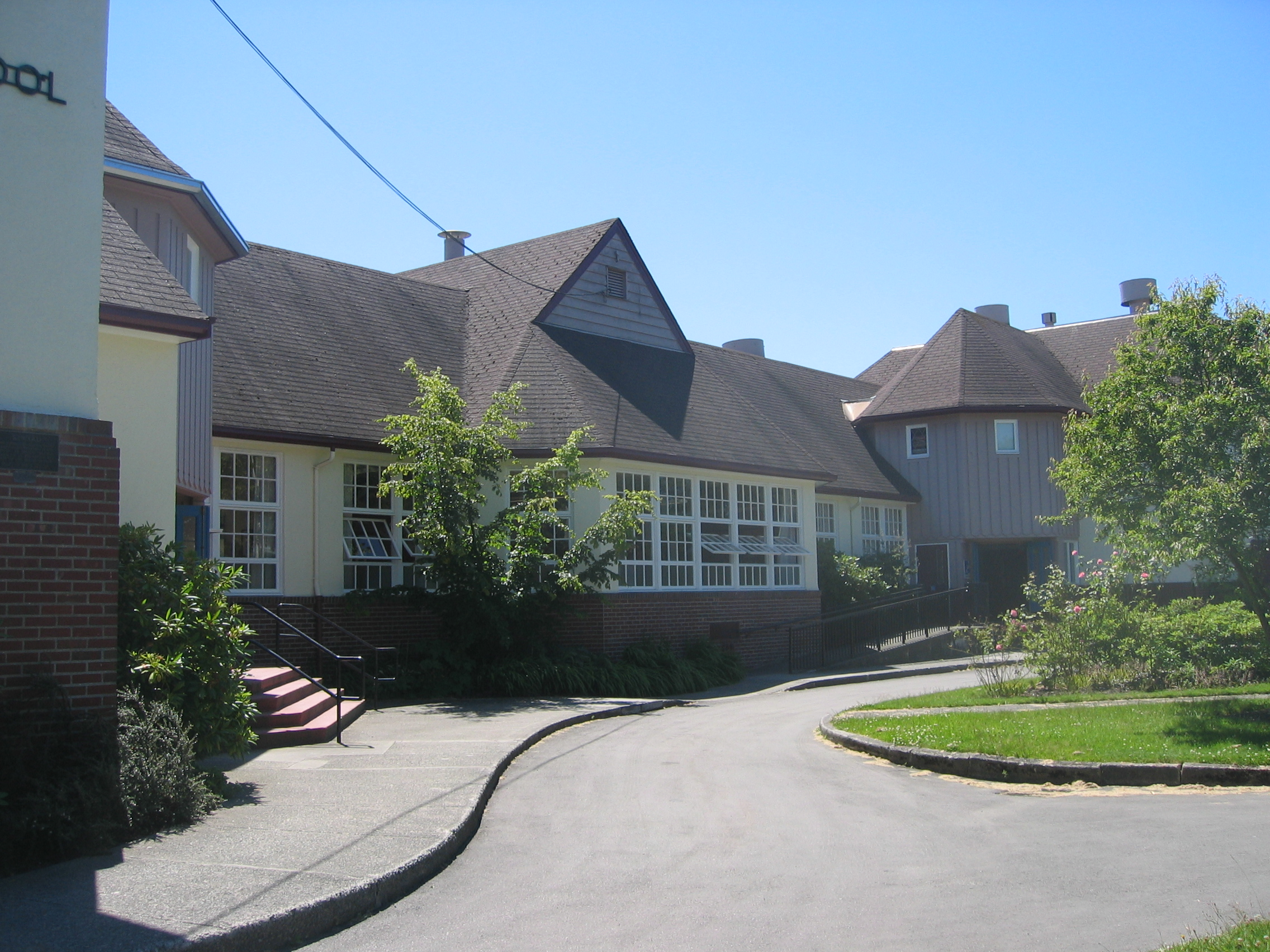

Location
- 4102 West 16th Avenue; Vancouver, British Columbia, V6R 3E3; Canada; 49.2576°N 123.1975°W

Information
- School type: Elementary school
- Founded: 1940
- School board: School District 39 Vancouver
- Superintendent: Suzanne Hoffman
- Area trustee: Oliver C. Hanson
- School number: 03939080
- Director: Ellen Roberts (Director of Instruction)
- Principal: Nancy Paget
- Grades: K-7
- Enrollment: 425 (2014)
- Language: English
- Area: West Point Grey, Dunbar-Southlands
- Colours: Navy and Gold
- Team name: Queen Elizabeth Lightning
- Website: go.vsb.bc.ca/schools/qe/Pages/default.aspx

Queen Elizabeth Elementary School in Vancouver, British Columbia, is an elementary school. The school opened in 1940 and is named after Queen Elizabeth who visited Canada in 1939, with her husband King George VI.

It is located at 4102 West 16th Avenue, at the edge of the city limits and immediately adjacent to the University Endowment Lands. As of 2022, the current school principal is Nancy Paget.

== See also ==
- Monarchy in British Columbia
- Royal eponyms in Canada
