= Princess Margaret Secondary School (Surrey, British Columbia) =

Princess Margaret Secondary
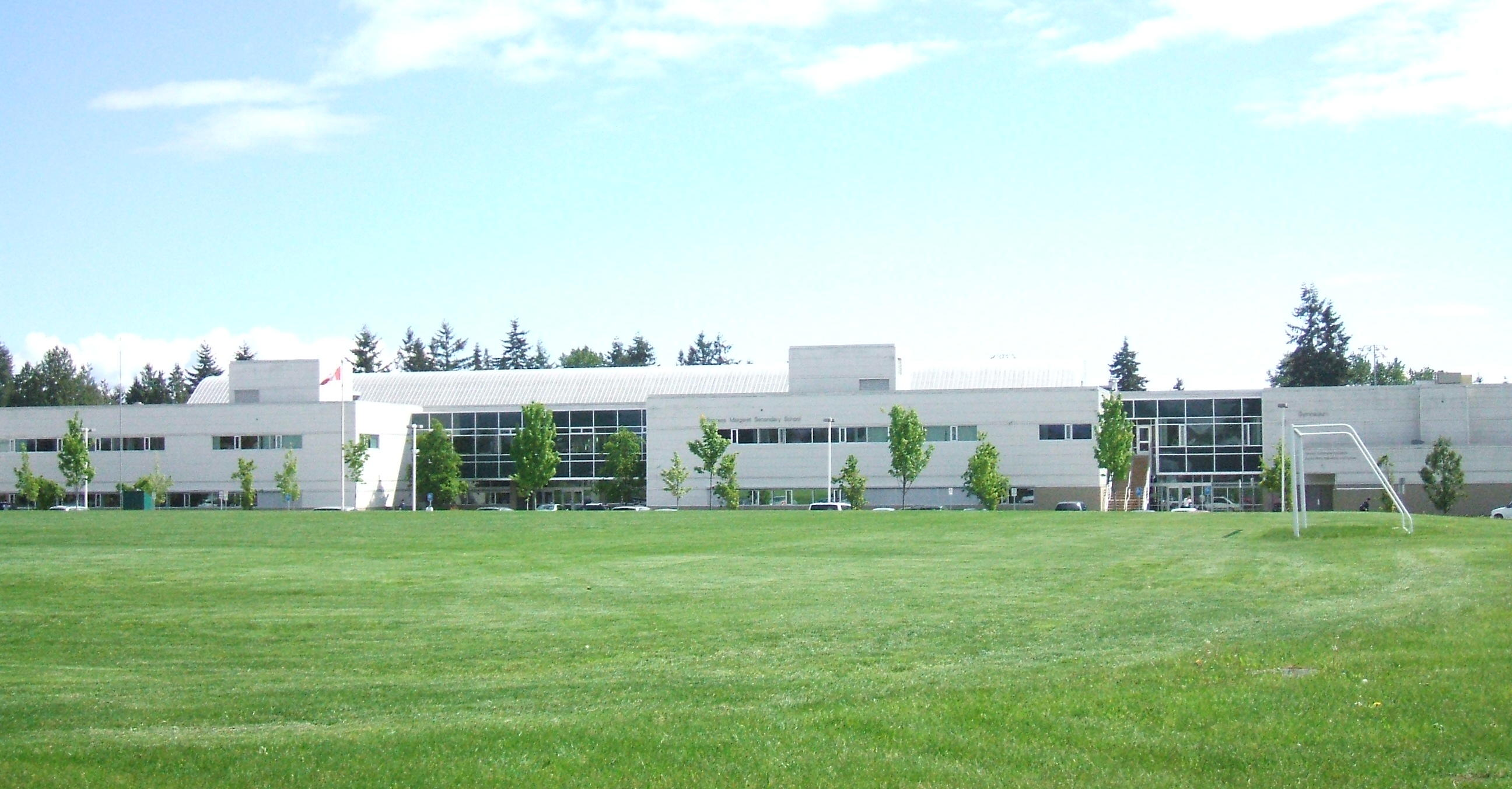

Location
- 12870 72 Avenue; Surrey, British Columbia, V3W 2M9; Canada; 49.1318°N 122.8657°W

Information
- School type: Public, high school
- Established: 1950 (First site); 1961 (Current site)
- School board: School District 36 Surrey
- School number: 3636246
- Principal: Robin Smalley
- Staff: 98
- Grades: 8-12
- Enrolment: 1,496 (2025)
- Colours: Black and Red
- Team name: Lions
- Website: surreyschools.ca/pmarga

Princess Margaret Secondary is a public high school in Surrey, British Columbia and is part of School District 36 Surrey. The school is notable in Surrey for its sports programs. The goals of Princess Margaret Secondary include increasing reading comprehension and increasing numeracy skills in Grade 8 students. The Princess Margaret Secondary school is located only 2 street blocks east of the Surrey Campus of Kwantlen Polytechnic University. The current building was completed in 1999; a previous smaller brick and mortar building served secondary students at the same site from 1961 until the summer of 1998 when it was demolished.

== Gallery ==
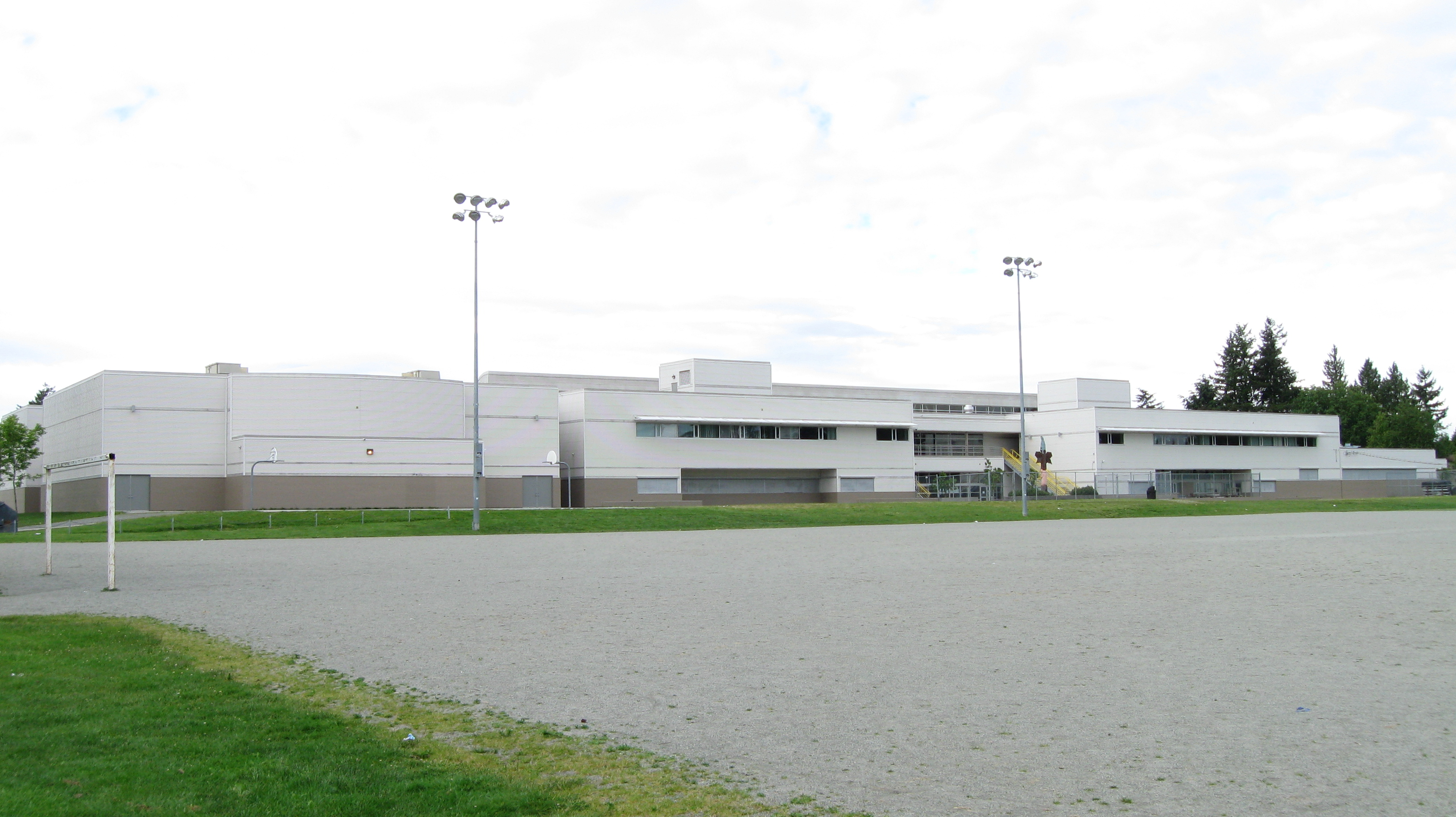
The view of Princess Margaret Secondary's rear facade.

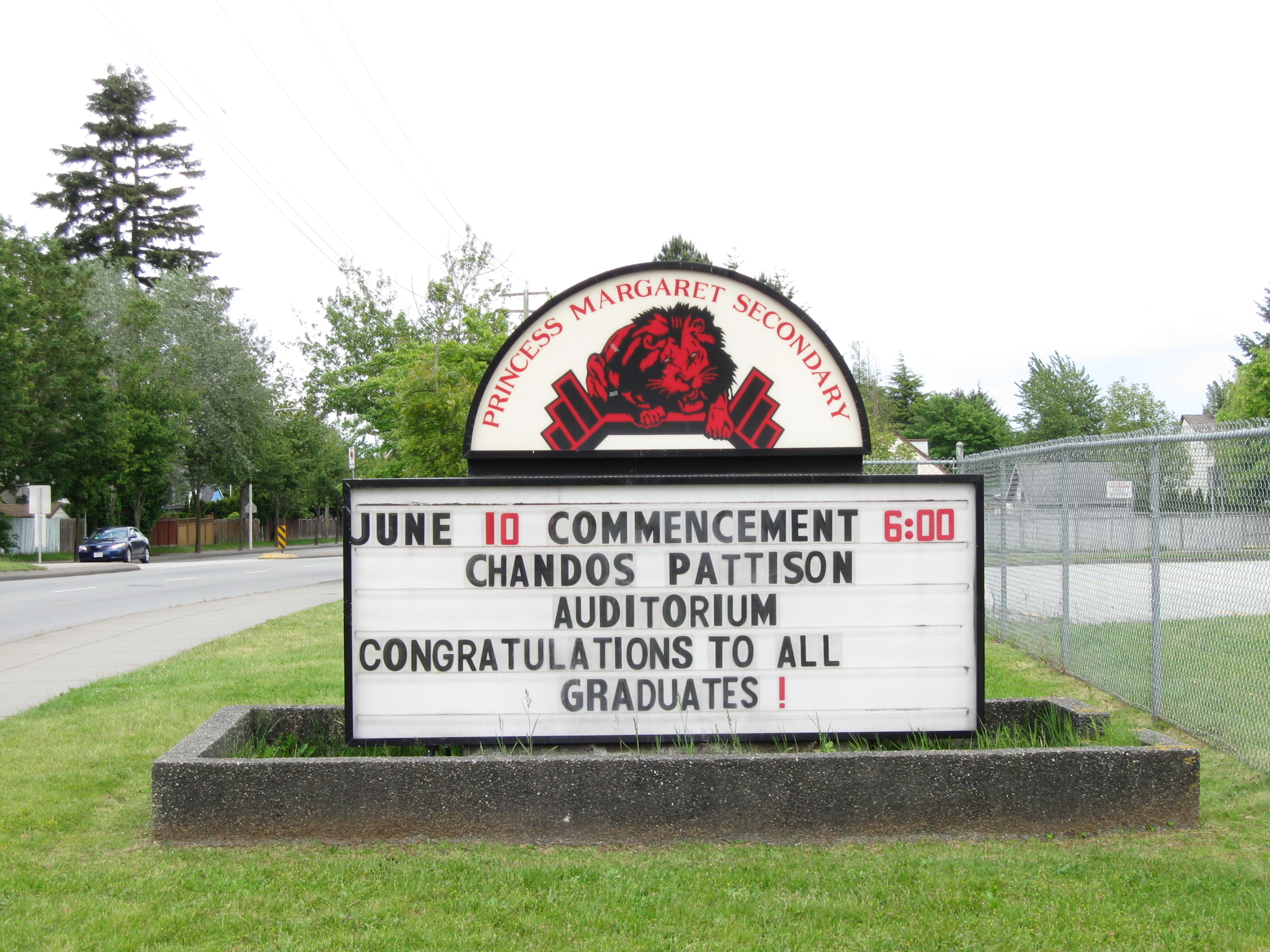
Princess Margaret Secondary's noticeboard.

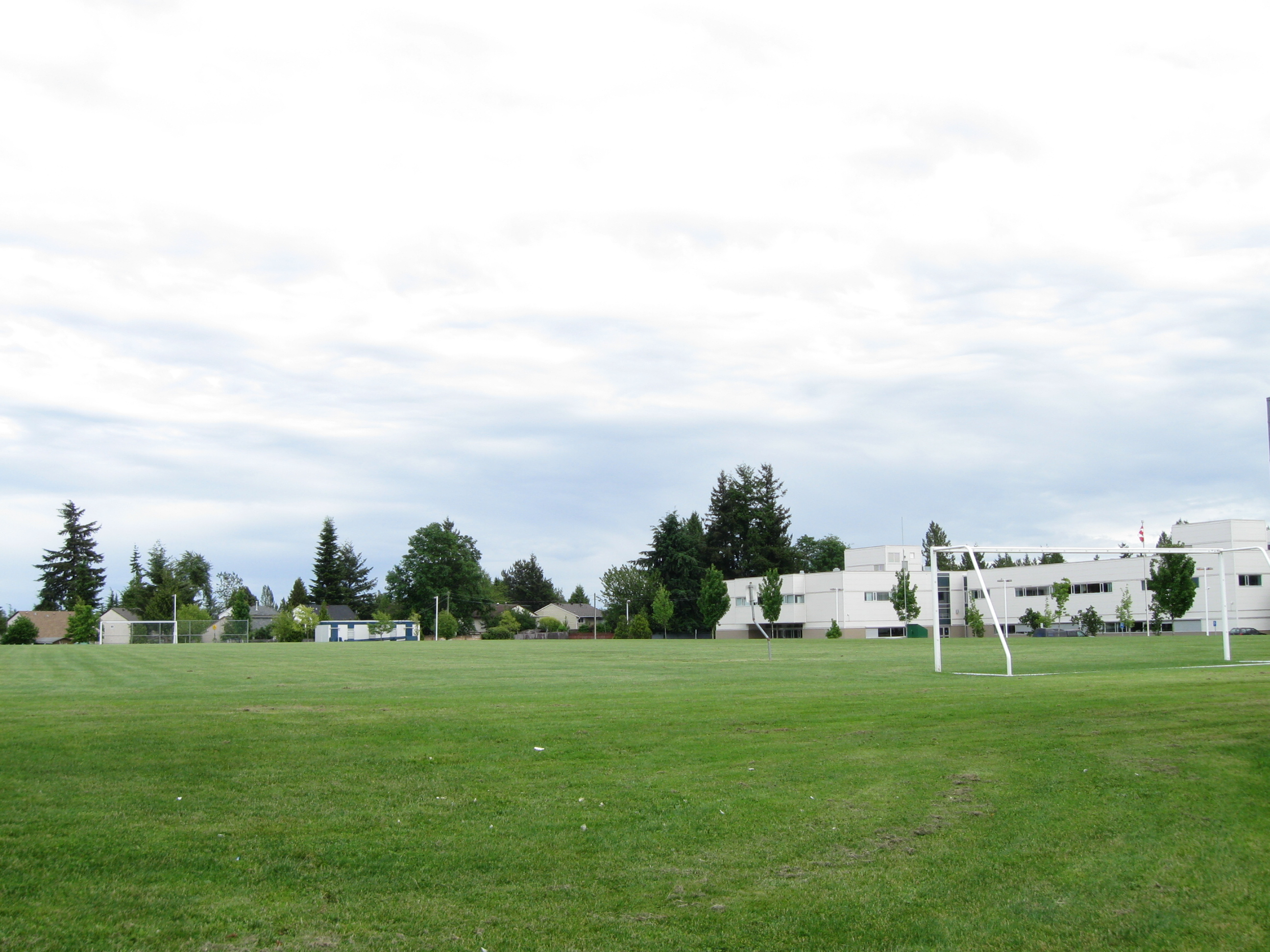
Princess Margaret Secondary's soccer field.

== History ==
=== Bose Road School ===
Princess Margaret High School was built in 1949/50 at 13220 64th Avenue. It shared the site with Bose Road Elementary School. At its founding, only grade 11s and 12s attended. Construction finished late in the 1950 school year, so students attended shifts at Queen Elizabeth Secondary. At its inception, the school was built to accommodate 500 students with 14 classrooms, a gym, an industrial arts shop and cafeteria facilities. The gym was unique among Surrey's schools for being completely detached from the rest of the building. In September 1961, PMHS moved to 72nd avenue and the 64th avenue school building became Newton Junior School

=== Senior High School (1961-94) ===
The new Princess Margaret High School was located at 12870 72nd Avenue. Students from North Delta attended due to the nearest Delta school being in Ladner. In 1967-68 when QE burnt down, Princess Margaret accommodated half of the school. QE students were in session in the morning, and PM students in the afternoon. Various upgrades over the years allowed the school to enroll a larger number of students.

==== 1967 fire ====
In November 1967, the school had a fire of its own. Fires broke out in the administrative offices and were burning for a long period of time before being discovered. The columns and floors were made out of concrete, which stemmed the spread of the flames, and little long-lasting damage was done. Students lost four days of school due to the fire.

=== Secondary School (1994-Present) ===
In the early 90s, Princess Margaret began to enroll some grade 8s-10s from Newton Junior while a new secondary school was being built. By 1994, it was a full secondary school. Concerns were raised about the cost of the school structure and seismic warnings, and the old school was torn down in 1999 and replaced by a new school building

== Student volunteer work ==
Princess Margaret students volunteered again in 2011 with the installation of Christmas lights at St. Paul's Hospital for the 'Lights of Hope' campaign in Vancouver. The student volunteers are enrolled in the BCIT Electrical Program while in secondary school.

== Notable alumni ==
- Jazzy B (Jaswinder Singh Bains), Punjabi Singer
- Lisa Brokop, country singer and actress

== See also ==
- Monarchy in British Columbia
- Royal eponyms in Canada
