= Royal eponyms in Canada =

In Canada, a number of sites and structures are named for royal individuals, whether a member of the past French royal family, British royal family, or present Canadian royal family thus reflecting the country's status as a constitutional monarchy under the Canadian Crown. Those who married into the royal family are indicated by an asterisk (*). Charles Edward Stuart was a pretender to the British throne.

== Eponymous royalty ==
=== King Francis I ===
King Francis I
Region	Geographic locations	Civil structures	Schools	Buildings
(Quebec) QC	Mount Royal; Montreal (indirectly)			

=== Queen Elizabeth I ===
Queen Elizabeth I Colloquially: Good Queen Bess
Region	Geographic locations	Civil structures	Schools	Buildings
(British Columbia) BC	Mount Queen Bess; Oriana Peak (Note: The mountain was named in 1982 for a collection of madrigals entitled The Triumphs of Oriana, with Oriana being a nickname for Queen Elizabeth.); Queen Bess Glacier			
(Nunavut) NU	Queen Elizabeth Foreland			

=== King Henry IV ===
King Henry IV
Region	Geographic locations	Civil structures	Schools	Buildings
(Nova Scotia) NS	Port Royal			
(Quebec) QC		Autoroute Henri-IV		

=== King James VI and I ===
King James VI and I
Region	Geographic locations	Civil structures	Schools	Buildings
(Ontario) ON		King James Avenue, Belle River		

=== Queen Henrietta Maria* ===
Queen Henrietta Maria
Region	Geographic locations	Civil structures	Schools	Buildings
(Ontario) ON	Cape Henrietta Maria			

=== Prince Rupert ===
Prince Rupert
Region	Geographic locations	Civil structures	Schools	Buildings
(Alberta) AB	Prince Rupert, Edmonton			
(Manitoba) MB		Rupert Avenue, Winnipeg; Rupertsland Avenue, Winnipeg (indirectly); Prince Rupert Avenue, Winnipeg		
(British Columbia) BC	Fort Rupert; Prince Rupert	Prince Rupert Airport	Prince Rupert Secondary School, Prince Rupert	
(Quebec) QC	Rupert River			
	Rupert's Land (divided into Ontario, Manitoba, Saskatchewan, Nunavut, Northwest Territories, and Yukon)			

=== King Charles I ===
King Charles I
Region	Geographic locations	Civil structures	Schools	Buildings
(Ontario) ON		King Charles Street, Belle River		

=== King Louis XIV ===
King Louis XIV
Region	Geographic locations	Civil structures	Schools	Buildings
(Nova Scotia) NS	Louisbourg			Fortress of Louisbourg
(Quebec) QC	Place Royale, Quebec City			

=== Queen Anne ===
Queen Anne
Region	Geographic locations	Civil structures	Schools	Buildings
(Nova Scotia) NS	Annapolis County; Annapolis Royal			Fort Anne, Annapolis Royal

=== Louis, Dauphin of France ===
Louis, Dauphin of France
Region	Geographic locations	Civil structures	Schools	Buildings
(Manitoba) MB	Dauphin			

=== King George I ===
King George I Other title: Duke of Brunswick-Lüneburg (1698–1714)
Region	Geographic locations	Civil structures	Schools	Buildings
(Nova Scotia) NS	Lunenburg			

=== King George II ===
King George II Other title: Prince of Wales (1714–1727)
Region	Geographic locations	Civil structures	Schools	Buildings
(Manitoba) MB				Prince of Wales Fort, Churchill
(Nova Scotia) NS	Cape George; George Bay; Georges Island; Kings County; Kingsport (Note: Named for its location in Kings County); Kingston			

=== Prince Frederick (1707–1751) ===
Prince Frederick
Region	Geographic locations	Civil structures	Schools	Buildings
(Ontario) ON	Point Frederick Peninsula, Kingston			Fort Frederick, Kingston

=== Charles Edward Stuart ===
Charles Edward Stuart
Region	Geographic locations	Civil structures	Schools	Buildings
(Prince Edward Island) PEI	Kingsboro			

=== Prince William (1721–1765) ===
Prince William Other title: The Duke of Cumberland (1726–1765)
Region	Geographic locations	Civil structures	Schools	Buildings
(Nova Scotia) NS	Cumberland Basin; Cumberland County; Prince William Parish			

=== King George III ===
King George III Other titles: Prince George (1738–1760) The Duke of Lancaster (1760–1820) Elector of Hanover (Brunswick-Lüneburg) (1760–1820)
Region	Geographic locations	Civil structures	Schools	Buildings
(British Columbia) BC	Strait of Georgia; Fort George (now Prince George) (Note: Only the original Fort George was named for George III. The city's current name, Prince George, honours the Duke of Kent who died in 1942.)			
(New Brunswick) NB	Kings County; Kingston; New Brunswick			
(Newfoundland and Labrador) NL	Georgetown; Georgestown; King's Point			
(Nova Scotia) NS	Kings Bay; Kingsburg; Lake George; Lake George; Port George	George Street, Sydney	King's-Edgehill School, Windsor; University of King's College, Halifax	Fort George, Halifax
(Ontario) ON	Kingston; Lancaster (now South Glengarry)	King Street, Hamilton; King Street, Kitchener/Waterloo; King Street, St. Catharines; King Street, Toronto		
(Prince Edward Island) PE	Georgetown; Kings County; Kings Royalty			

=== Queen Charlotte* ===
Queen Charlotte
Region	Geographic locations	Civil structures	Schools	Buildings
(British Columbia) BC	Queen Charlotte City (later renamed Daajing Giids (Note: Named for its location in the archipelago (now known as Haida Gwaii)); Queen Charlotte Islands (later renamed Haida Gwaii) (Note: The islands were named by the explorer George Dixon for his ship the Queen Charlotte, which in turn was named for the queen.); Queen Charlotte Channel; Queen Charlotte Strait; Queen Charlotte Sound			
(New Brunswick) NB	Charlotte County; Queens County; Queensbury Parish (Note: Named for the Queen's Rangers); Queenstown (Note: Named for its location in Queens County)		Queen's College	
(Newfoundland and Labrador) NL	Charlottetown (Note: Hamilton suggests the town was named in honor of the city on Prince Edward Island.Hamilton (1978, p. 110))			
(Nova Scotia) NS	Queens County	Charlotte Street, Sydney		Fort Charlotte, Halifax
(Ontario) ON	Charlotteville Township; Charlottenburgh; Queensborough; Queenston; Queensville			
(Prince Edward Island) PE	Charlottetown; Queens County; Queens Royalty	Queen Street, Charlottetown		Queen Charlotte Armouries, Charlottetown

=== Prince Frederick (1763–1827) ===
Prince Frederick Other title: The Duke of York and Albany (1784–1827)
Region	Geographic locations	Civil structures	Schools	Buildings
(New Brunswick) NB	Fredericton; York County			
(Nova Scotia) NS		York Street, Sydney		
(Ontario) ON	East York; North York; York (renamed Toronto); Yorkville; York County; York Region	Duke Street, Toronto (later renamed Adelaide Street); Frederick Street, Toronto	York University	Duke of York Inn, Toronto
(Nunavut) NU	Duke of York Bay			

=== Princess Frederica* ===
Princess Frederica Other title: The Duchess of York and Albany (1791–1820)
Region	Geographic locations	Civil structures	Schools	Buildings
(Ontario) ON		Duchess Street, Toronto (later renamed Richmond Street)		

=== Prince Edward (1767–1820) ===
Prince Edward Other title: The Duke of Kent (1799–1820)
Region	Geographic locations	Civil structures	Schools	Buildings
(New Brunswick) NB	Kent County; Prince Edward Square, Saint John	Prince Edward Street, Saint John	Prince Edward School, Moncton	
(Nova Scotia) NS	Edwardsville; Kent Park, Halifax; Kentville; Point Edward; Prince Edward Trail, Halifax; Prince's Lodge; Prince's Walk, Halifax	Castle Hill Drive, Halifax; Kent Avenue, Halifax; Kent Street, Halifax; Lodge Drive, Halifax; Lodge Crescent, Halifax		
(Ontario) ON	Edwardsburgh/Cardinal; Point Edward Village; Prince Edward County	Kent Street, Ottawa; Kent Street, Brighton		
(Prince Edward Island) PE	Prince Edward Island	Kent Street, Charlottetown; Kent Street, Georgetown; Prince Edward Battery, Charlottetown	Kent College (today the University of Prince Edward Island); West Kent Elementary School	
(Quebec) QC	Kent Course, Royal Quebec Golf Club, Boischatel	Rue du Duc-de-Kent, Beauport; Rue du Duc-de-Kent, Quebec City; Rue du Prince-Édouard, Quebec City; Rue Kent, Gatineau; Rue Kent, Longueuil; Rue Kent, Sainte-Anne-de-Bellevue		Kent Gate, Quebec City; Kent House, Montmorency Falls; Kent House, Quebec City

=== Princess Victoria* (1786–1861) ===
Princess Victoria Other title: The Duchess of Kent (1818–1861)
Region	Geographic locations	Civil structures	Schools	Buildings
(Prince Edward Island) PE				Duchess of Kent Inn, Charlottetown

=== Prince Augustus ===
Prince Augustus Other title: The Duke of Sussex (1801–1843)
Region	Geographic locations	Civil structures	Schools	Buildings
(Ontario) ON		Sussex Drive, Ottawa		

=== Prince Adolphus ===
Prince Adolphus Other title: The Duke of Cambridge (1801–1850)
Region	Geographic locations	Civil structures	Schools	Buildings
(Ontario) ON	Adolphustown			
(Nunavut) NU	Cambridge Bay			

=== Princess Augusta ===
Princess Augusta
Region	Geographic locations	Civil structures	Schools	Buildings
(Ontario) ON	Augusta Township; North Augusta	Augusta Street, Hamilton		

=== Princess Mary ===
Princess Mary Other title: The Duchess of Gloucester (1816–1857)
Region	Geographic locations	Civil structures	Schools	Buildings
(New Brunswick) NB	Gloucester County			
(Ontario) ON	North Marysburgh			

=== Princess Sophia ===
Princess Sophia
Region	Geographic locations	Civil structures	Schools	Buildings
(Ontario) ON	Sophiasburgh			

=== Princess Amelia ===
Princess Amelia
Region	Geographic locations	Civil structures	Schools	Buildings
(Ontario) ON	Ameliasburgh; Ameliasburgh Township			
(Nova Scotia) NS	Point Amelia	Amelia Street, Sydney		

=== King George IV ===
King George IV Other title: The Duke of Cornwall (1762–1820) Royal house: House of Guelph
Region	Geographic locations	Civil structures	Schools	Buildings
(Newfoundland and Labrador) NL	King George IV Ecological Reserve; King George IV Lake			
(Nova Scotia) NS				Prince of Wales Tower, Halifax
(Ontario) ON	Cornwall; Georgian Bay; Guelph	George Street, Toronto	King George Public School, Guelph	Prince George Hotel, Kingston
(Prince Edward Island) PE	Prince County; Prince Royalty; Princetown			
(Nunavut) NU	Coronation Gulf			

=== Queen Caroline* ===
Queen Caroline
Region	Geographic locations	Civil structures	Schools	Buildings
(Ontario) ON		Queen Street, Hamilton; Caroline Street, Toronto (later renamed Sherbourne Street)		

=== King Leopold I* ===
King Leopold I Other title: Prince Leopold of Saxe-Coburg-Saalfeld (1790–1826)
Region	Geographic locations	Civil structures	Schools	Buildings
(Ontario) ON	Cobourg			

=== King William IV ===
King William IV Other titles: Prince William Henry (1765–1830) The Duke of Clarence and St. Andrews (1765–1830)
Region	Geographic locations	Civil structures	Schools	Buildings
(New Brunswick) NB	Prince William			
(Nova Scotia) NS		Prince Street, Sydney (originally Prince William Henry Street)		Mariner King Inn, Lunenburg
(Quebec) QC	Clarenceville			
(Ontario) ON	King William Street, Hamilton; Williamsburg; Williamsford; Williamstown			
(Saskatchewan) SK		William Avenue, Saskatoon		
(Nunavut) NU	King William Island			

=== Queen Adelaide* ===
Queen Adelaide
Region	Geographic locations	Civil structures	Schools	Buildings
(Ontario) ON	Adelaide	Adelaide Street, London; Adelaide Street, Toronto		
(Saskatchewan) SK	Adelaide/Churchill, Saskatoon			
(Nunavut) NU	Adelaide Peninsula			

=== The Viscountess Falkland ===
The Viscountess Falkland (Note: The Viscountess Falkland, née Amelia Cary FitzClarence, was the youngest of William IV's illegitimate children.)
Region	Geographic locations	Civil structures	Schools	Buildings
(Nova Scotia) NS	Falkland			

=== Queen Victoria ===
Queen Victoria Other title: Empress of India (1876–1901)
Region	Geographic locations	Civil structures	Schools	Buildings
(Alberta) AB	Empress; Fort Victoria; Mount Victoria; Victoria Glacier; Victoria Park, Calgary; Victoria Peak		Victoria School of Performing and Visual Arts, Edmonton	Fort Victoria, Smoky Lake; Victoria Arena, Calgary (demolished)
(British Columbia) BC	Mount Victoria; Queen Peak; Queensborough (Note: Queensborough was the original name for New Westminster. The name was changed at Victoria's suggestion. In 1908, the present Queensborough was established and named in honour of the prior name.); Victoria; Victoria Harbour; Victoria Park, North Vancouver; Victoria Peak	Statue of Queen Victoria (Victoria, British Columbia)	Queen Victoria Annex, Vancouver	The Empress, Victoria; Royal Jubilee Hospital, Victoria
(Manitoba) MB	Lake Victoria; Victoria; Victoria Beach	Empress Street, Winnipeg; Jubilee Avenue, Winnipeg	Victoria Albert Public School, Winnipeg	Victoria General Hospital, Winnipeg
(New Brunswick) NB	Victoria; Victoria County; Victoria Park, Moncton			
(Newfoundland and Labrador) NL	Queen's Cove; Queen's Lake; Victoria; Victoria Cove; Victoria Lake; Victoria Park, St. John's; Victoria River			Queen's Battery Barracks, St. John's
(Nova Scotia) NS	Queensland; Queensport; Queensville; Victoria; Victoria Beach; Victoria County; Victoriavale; Victoria Harbour; Victoria Park, Halifax; Victoria Park, Sydney; Victoria Park, Truro; Victoria Park, Westville; Victoria Vale	Victoria Jubilee Fountain, Halifax; Victoria Road, Sydney		Victoria General Hospital, Halifax (now Queen Elizabeth II Health Sciences Centre)
(Ontario) ON	Queen's Park, Toronto; Queen Victoria Park, Niagara Falls; Queen Victoria Fountain, Niagara Falls; Victoria; Victoria Corners; Victoria County (now City of Kawartha Lakes); Victoria Falls; Victoria Harbour; Victoria Island; Victoria Lake; Victoria Memorial Square, Toronto; Victoria Park (Galt), Cambridge; Victoria Park (Hespeler), Cambridge; Victoria Park, Kitchener; Victoria Park, London; Victoria Road; Victoria Springs; Victoria Square	Queen Street, Niagara Falls; Queen Street, Ottawa; Queen Street East, Toronto; Queen Street West, Toronto; Victoria Avenue, Niagara Falls; Victoria Bridge, Queen Elizabeth II Wildlands Provincial Park; Victoria Park Avenue, Toronto	Queen's University, Kingston; Victoria University, Toronto; Victoria Park Collegiate Institute, Toronto	Queen's Gates, Ottawa; Queen's Hotel, Toronto (demolished); Queen's Lantern, Canadian Museum of Nature, Ottawa; Royal Victoria Hospital, Barrie; Victoria Building, Ottawa; Victoria Hall, Cobourg; Victoria Hall, Hamilton; Victoria Hall, Kingston; Victoria Hall, Petrolia; Victoria Memorial Museum Building, Ottawa; Victoria Park Station, Toronto
(Prince Edward Island) PE	Victoria; Victoria Cross; Victoria Park, Charlottetown; Victoria Provincial Park; Victoria West			
(Quebec) QC	Grand lac Victoria; Parc Victoria, Quebec City; Victoria Square, Montreal; Victoriaville	Avenue Victoria, Saint-Lambert/Longueuil; Victoria Bridge, Montreal; Victoria Street, Montreal; Rue Victoria, Longueuil		Royal Victoria Hospital, Montreal
(Saskatchewan) SK	Lake Victoria; Regina; Victoria Park, Regina; Victoria Park, Saskatoon	Empress Avenue, Saskatoon; Empress Street, Saskatoon; Queen Street, Saskatoon; Victoria Avenue, Regina; Victoria Avenue, Saskatoon	Victoria School, Kamsack; Victoria School, Saskatoon	
(Northwest Territories) NT	Victoria Island			
(Nunavut) NU	Victoria Harbour; Victoria Island; Victoria and Albert Mountains			

=== Prince Albert* ===
Prince Albert Other title: Prince of Saxe-Coburg and Gotha (1819–1857)
Region	Geographic locations	Civil structures	Schools	Buildings
(British Columbia) BC	Albert Head; Coburg Peninsula; Consort Park, Vancouver; Gotha Point; Mount Albert; Saxe Point			
(Manitoba) MB	Albert Beach	Albert Street, Winnipeg	Victoria Albert Public School, Winnipeg	
(New Brunswick) NB	Albert County; Albert Mines; Riverside-Albert	Albert Street, Fredericton	Albert Street Middle School, Fredericton	
(Nova Scotia) NS	Prince Albert; Albert Bridge			
(Ontario) ON	Prince Albert	Albert Street, Ottawa	Albert College, Belleville	
(Saskatchewan) SK	Prince Albert; Prince Albert National Park	Albert Avenue, Saskatoon; Albert Street, Regina		Albert Community Centre, Saskatoon
(Nunavut) NU	Victoria and Albert Mountains			

=== Princess Victoria (1840–1901) ===
Princess Victoria Other title: Princess Royal (1841–1901)
Region	Geographic locations	Civil structures	Schools	Buildings
(British Columbia) BC	Princess Royal Reach			
(Ontario) ON		Princess Street, Kingston		
(Nunavut) NU	Princess Royal Island			

=== Princess Alice ===
Princess Alice
Region	Geographic locations	Civil structures	Schools	Buildings
(British Columbia) BC	Mount Alice			

=== Prince Alfred ===
Prince Alfred
Region	Geographic locations	Civil structures	Schools	Buildings
(British Columbia) BC	Mount Alfred			

=== Princess Helena ===
Princess Helena
Region	Geographic locations	Civil structures	Schools	Buildings
(British Columbia) BC	Mount Helena			

=== Princess Louise (1848–1939) ===
Princess Louise Full name: Louisa Caroline Alberta
Region	Geographic locations	Civil structures	Schools	Buildings
(Alberta) AB	Alberta; Alberta Beach; Alberta River; Lake Louise; Lake Louise; Little Alberta; Mount Alberta			
(British Columbia) BC	Princess Louisa Inlet; Princess Louisa Marine Provincial Park			
(Manitoba) MB	Louise	Princess Street, Winnipeg; Louise Street, Winnipeg		
(New Brunswick) NB	Princess Louise's Park, Sussex			
(Ontario) ON	Princess Louise Falls, Ottawa; Princess Louise Park, Ottawa	Princess Louise Drive, Ottawa		
(Quebec) QC	Louiseville			

=== The Duke of Argyll* ===
The Duke of Argyll Other title: The Marquess of Lorne (1847–1900)
Region	Geographic locations	Civil structures	Schools	Buildings
(Alberta) AB		Marquis of Lorne Trail, Calgary; Argyll Road, Edmonton		
(British Columbia) BC		Lorne Hotel, Comox		
(Manitoba) MB	Argyle; Lorne	Lorne Avenue, Winnipeg; Argyle Street, Winnipeg; Lorne Street, Trenton, Ontario		
(New Brunswick) NB	Lorne; Lorneville			
(Nova Scotia) NS		Argyle Street, Sydney		
(Ontario) ON		Argyle Avenue, Ottawa		
(Saskatchewan) SK		Argyle Avenue, Saskatoon; Lorne Avenue, Saskatoon		

=== Prince Arthur ===
Prince Arthur Other title: The Duke of Connaught and Strathearn (1874–1942)
Region	Geographic locations	Civil structures	Schools	Buildings
(Alberta) AB	Connaught, Calgary	Connaught Drive, Glenora, Edmonton; Connaught Drive, Jasper		Connaught Armoury, Edmonton
(British Columbia) BC	Mount Arthur	Connaught Tunnel; Connaught Bridge, more commonly called Cambie Bridge, Vancouver		
(Manitoba) MB	Arthur			
(New Brunswick) NB		Connaught Street, Fredericton	Connaught Street Elementary School, Fredericton	
(Nova Scotia) NS			Prince Arthur Junior High School, Dartmouth	
(Northwest Territories) NT	Prince Patrick Island			
(Ontario) ON	Connaught Crescent, Sarnia; Connaught Place, Ottawa (later Confederation Square); Port Arthur (now Thunder Bay)	Prince Arthur Avenue, Toronto	Connaught Public School, Ottawa	Connaught Building, Ottawa; Royal Connaught Hotel, Hamilton
(Quebec) QC		Prince Arthur Street, Montreal		
(Saskatchewan) SK		Connaught Avenue, Saskatoon; Connaught Crescent, Regina; Connaught Place, Saskatoon	Connaught School, Regina; Prince Arthur Community School, Moose Jaw	Connaught Block, Saskatoon

=== Princess Patricia ===
Princess Patricia
Region	Geographic locations	Civil structures	Schools	Buildings
(Alberta) AB	Patricia; Patricia Lake; Princess; Princess Patricia Park, Edmonton	Patricia Street, Jasper		
(British Columbia) BC	Patricia Bay			
(Ontario) ON	Patricia Portion, Kenora District			
(Saskatchewan) SK				Patricia Hotel, Saskatoon

=== Prince Leopold ===
Prince Leopold Other title: The Duke of Albany (1881–1884)
Region	Geographic locations	Civil structures	Schools	Buildings
(Ontario) ON			Albany Club, Toronto	
(Saskatchewan) SK		Leopold Crescent, Regina		

=== Princess Beatrice ===
Princess Beatrice Full name: Beatrice Mary Victoria Feodore
Region	Geographic locations	Civil structures	Schools	Buildings
(British Columbia) BC	Mount Victoria (renamed ḵ’els)			

=== The Earl of Athlone* ===
The Earl of Athlone
Region	Geographic locations	Civil structures	Schools	Buildings
(Alberta) AB	Athlone, Edmonton		Athlone Elementary School, Edmonton	
(Manitoba) MB		Athlone Drive, Winnipeg	Athlone School, Winnipeg	
(Newfoundland and Labrador) NL	Athlone			
(Ontario) ON				The Athlone, Ottawa

=== King Edward VII ===
King Edward VII Full name: Albert Edward Other titles: The Prince of Wales (1841–1901) The Duke of Rothesay (1841–1901) Baron of Renfrew (1901–1910)
Region	Geographic locations	Civil structures	Schools	Buildings
(Alberta) AB	King Edward Park, Edmonton			King Edward Hotel, Banff; King Edward Hotel, Calgary
(British Columbia) BC	King Edward Peak; Mount Albert; Mount Albert Edward; Mount King Edward; Port Edward; Prince of Wales Reach; Princeton	King Edward Avenue, Vancouver; Kingsway, Vancouver	Prince of Wales Secondary School, Vancouver	King Edward Station, Vancouver
(Manitoba) MB	Albert	King Edward Street, Winnipeg	King Edward Public School, Winnipeg	King Edward Memorial Hospital, Winnipeg (now part of Riverview Health Centre)
(New Brunswick) NB	Rothesay			
(Newfoundland and Labrador) NL				Prince of Wales Rink, St. John's (destroyed by fire)
(Nova Scotia) NS	Edwardsville; Point Edward; Princeport; Prince of Wales Landing Place, Sydney; Renfrew (now a ghost town)			
(Ontario) ON	King Edward Park, Brighton; Mount Albert; Point Edward; Prince's Square, Hamilton; Prince of Wales Falls, Ottawa	King Edward Avenue, Ottawa; Prince of Wales Bridge, Ottawa (renamed Chief William Commanda Bridge)	King Edward School, Kitchener; Prince of Wales Public School, Peterborough	King Edward Hotel, Toronto
(Prince Edward Island) PE	PE: Alberton		Prince of Wales College, Charlottetown (merged into UPEI)	
(Quebec) QC		Route Édouard VII, Saint Philippe de Laprairie		
(Saskatchewan) SK		Edward Avenue, Saskatoon; King Crescent, Saskatoon; King Street, Saskatoon; Prince of Wales Avenue, Saskatoon	King Edward School, Saskatoon (demolished)	King Edward Hotel, Saskatoon (destroyed by fire); King Edward Place, Saskatoon; Prince of Wales Branch Library, Regina
(Nunavut) NU	Prince of Wales Island			

=== Queen Alexandra* ===
Queen Alexandra Other title: Princess Alexandra (1844–1901)
Region	Geographic locations	Civil structures	Schools	Buildings
(Alberta) AB	Alexandra (provincial electoral district) 1909–1971; Queen Alexandra, Edmonton		Queen Alexandra Elementary School, Edmonton; Alexandra School, Medicine Hat (Now known as Alexandra Middle School)	Royal Alexandra Hospital, Edmonton
(British Columbia) BC	Alexandra Bridge Provincial Park; Alexandra Park, Vancouver; Alexandra Peak; Mount Alexandra	Alexandra Bridge, Fraser Canyon (Note: Named for its proximity to Alexandra Bridge)	Queen Alexandra Elementary School, Vancouver	
(Nova Scotia) NS		Alexandra Street, Sydney		
(Ontario) ON	Alexandra Park, Toronto	Royal Alexandra Interprovincial Bridge, Ottawa	Queen Alexandra Public School, Toronto	Queen Alexandra Community Centre, Peterborough; Royal Alexandra Theatre, Toronto
(Saskatchewan) SK		Alexandra Avenue, Saskatoon	Princess Alexandra School, Saskatoon	

=== Princess Maud ===
Princess Maud Other title: Queen Maud (1905–1938)
Region	Geographic locations	Civil structures	Schools	Buildings
(Nunavut) NU	Queen Maud Gulf			

=== Princess Louise (1867–1931) ===
Princess Louise Other title: Princess Royal (1905–1931)
Region	Geographic locations	Civil structures	Schools	Buildings
(British Columbia) BC				SS Princess Royal (scrapped)

=== King George V ===
King George V Other titles: The Duke of York (1892–1910) The Prince of Wales (1901–1910)
Region	Geographic locations	Civil structures	Schools	Buildings
(Alberta) AB	Coronation		King George School, Calgary	
(British Columbia) BC	Mount George V; Mount King George			
(Manitoba) MB			George V Public School, Winnipeg	King George Hospital, Winnipeg (now part of Riverview Health Centre)
(New Brunswick) NB		George Street, Fredericton	George Street Middle School, Fredericton	
(Newfoundland and Labrador) NL	King George V Park, St. John's			King George V Building, St. John's
(Ontario) ON	Coronation Park, Oakville		King George Public School, Newmarket	St. George's Chapel, Cathedral Church of St. James, Toronto; Prince of Wales Hotel, Niagara-on-the-Lake
(Quebec) QC	Place George V, Quebec City			
(Saskatchewan) SK	King George, Saskatoon		King George School, Saskatoon	King George Hotel, Saskatoon
(Nunavut) NU	King George V Mountain			

=== Queen Mary* ===
Queen Mary
Region	Geographic locations	Civil structures	Schools	Buildings
(Alberta) AB	Queen Mary Park, Edmonton			
(British Columbia) BC			Queen Mary Elementary School, Vancouver	
(Ontario) ON		Queen Mary Drive, Oakville	Queen Mary Public School, Peterborough; Queen Mary Street Public School, Ottawa	Queen Mary Hospital (part of West Park Healthcare Centre)
(Quebec) QC		Queen Mary Road, Montreal		
(Saskatchewan) SK			Queen Mary School, Prince Albert	

=== King Edward VIII ===
King Edward VIII Other titles: Prince Edward (1894–1936), (1936–1972) The Prince of Wales (1910–1936)
Region	Geographic locations	Civil structures	Schools	Buildings
(Alberta) AB				Prince of Wales Hotel, Waterton
(British Columbia) BC	Mount Prince Edward			
(Ontario) ON		Prince Edward Viaduct, Toronto; Princes Boulevard		Princes' Gates, Toronto
(Saskatchewan) SK		Prince of Wales Avenue, Saskatoon		Prince of Wales Promenade, Regina

=== Prince George ===
Prince George
Region	Geographic locations	Civil structures	Schools	Buildings
(British Columbia) BC	Prince George			
(Ontario) ON		Princes Boulevard, Toronto		Princes' Gates, Toronto

=== King George VI ===
King George VI Other title: The Duke of York (1920–1936)
Region	Geographic locations	Civil structures	Schools	Buildings
(Alberta) AB	King's Lookout, Tunnel Mountain	Kingsway, Edmonton		
(British Columbia) BC	King George VI Provincial Park; Mount Prince Albert	King George Boulevard, Surrey	King George Secondary School, Vancouver	King George Hub; King George Station; King George Tower (unbuilt)
(Ontario) ON	Coronation Park, Toronto	King George VI Bridge, Port Stanley	Duke of York School, Toronto; King George VI School, Kenora	King George VI Chapel, Grace Church on-the-Hill, Toronto
(Quebec) QC		George VI Avenue, Quebec City		
(Saskatchewan) SK	King George, Saskatoon		King George Community School, Prince Albert; King George School, Moose Jaw; King George School, Saskatoon	

=== Queen Elizabeth* ===
Queen Elizabeth
Region	Geographic locations	Civil structures	Schools	Buildings
(Alberta) AB	Queen Elizabeth Park, Edmonton	Queen Elizabeth Park Road, Edmonton		Queen Elizabeth Pool, Edmonton
(British Columbia) BC	Queen Elizabeth Park, Revelstoke; Queen Elizabeth Park, Vancouver		Queen Elizabeth Secondary School, Surrey; Queen Elizabeth Annex, Vancouver; Queen Elizabeth Elementary School, Vancouver	
(Newfoundland and Labrador) NL			Queen Elizabeth Regional High School, Conception Bay	
(Nova Scotia) NS			Queen Elizabeth High School, Halifax	
(Ontario) ON		Queen Elizabeth Way	Queen Elizabeth Public School, Ottawa; Queen Elizabeth School, Kitchener	
(Saskatchewan) SK	Queen Elizabeth, Saskatoon		Queen Elizabeth School, Lloydminster; Queen Elizabeth School, Saskatoon; Queen Elizabeth School, Weyburn	

=== Princess Margaret ===
Princess Margaret
Region	Geographic locations	Civil structures	Schools	Buildings
(Alberta) AB	Princess Margaret Mountain			
(British Columbia) BC	Princess Margaret Marine Park		Princess Margaret Secondary School, Surrey; Princess Margaret Secondary School, Penticton	
(Manitoba) MB			Princess Margaret School, Winnipeg	
(New Brunswick) NB		Princess Margaret Bridge, Fredericton		
(Nova Scotia) NS			Princess Margaret Rose Elementary School, Truro	
(Ontario) ON	Princess Margaret Gardens, Toronto	Princess Margaret Boulevard, Toronto	Princess Margaret Nursery School, Etobicoke; Princess Margaret Junior School, Etobicoke	Princess Margaret Cancer Centre, Toronto
(Saskatchewan) SK			Princess Margaret School, Prince Albert	

=== Queen Elizabeth II ===
Queen Elizabeth II Other title: Princess Elizabeth (1926–1952)
Region	Geographic locations	Civil structures	Schools	Buildings
(Alberta) AB	Coronation Park, Edmonton; Diamond Jubilee Park, Wetaskiwin; Queen Elizabeth Provincial Park; Queen Elizabeth Ranges; Queen Elizabeth II Park, Calgary	Princess Elizabeth Avenue, Edmonton; Queen Elizabeth II Highway	École Queen Elizabeth, Wetaskiwin; Queen Elizabeth High School, Edmonton; Queen Elizabeth Junior and Senior High School, Calgary; Queen Elizabeth School, Lloydminster	Queen Elizabeth Hospital, Edmonton; Queen Elizabeth II Hospital, Grande Prairie; Queen Elizabeth II Planetarium, Edmonton
(British Columbia) BC	Queen Elizabeth Ranges	Queen Elizabeth II Promenade, Nanaimo	Queen Elizabeth Annex, Vancouver; Queen Elizabeth Elementary School, New Westminster; Queen Elizabeth Elementary School, Vancouver; Queen Elizabeth Secondary School, Surrey	Queen Elizabeth Theatre, Vancouver; Queen Elizabeth II Observatory, Mount Kobau (Proposed)
(Manitoba) MB	Queen Elizabeth II Gardens, Winnipeg; Queen Elizabeth II Playground, Brandon	Queen Elizabeth Avenue, Clanwilliam; Queen Elizabeth Avenue, Erickson; Queen Elizabeth II Way, Winnipeg		Princess Elizabeth Hospital, Winnipeg; Queen Elizabeth II Music Building, Brandon
(New Brunswick) NB	Coronation Park, Bathurst; Platinum Jubilee Garden, Government House, Fredericton; Princess Elizabeth Playground and Sportsfield	Queen Elizabeth Boulevard, Moncton; Queen Elizabeth Drive, Bathurst	Coronation Park Elementary School, Bathurst; Diamond Jubilee IT Centre, Hazen-White-St. Francis School, Saint John; Princess Elizabeth School, Saint John; Queen Elizabeth School, Moncton	
(Newfoundland and Labrador) NL	Platinum Jubilee Walkway, St John's	Queen Elizabeth II Bridge, Trans-Canada Highway, between Glenwood and Appleton	Queen Elizabeth High School, St. Edward's	Queen Elizabeth Regional High School, Conception Bay South; Queen Elizabeth II Library, St. John's
(Nova Scotia) NS	Queen Elizabeth Park, Glace Bay	Jubilee Highway; Queen Elizabeth II Platinum Jubilee Bench, Halifax; Queen Elizabeth II Walkway, Halifax	Jubilee Elementary School, Sydney Mines; Queen Elizabeth High School, Halifax	Queen Elizabeth II Health Sciences Centre, Halifax
(Ontario) ON	Diamond Jubilee Gardens, Cambridge; Diamond Jubilee Park, Ottawa; Golden Jubilee Greenway, Markham; Golden Jubilee Park, Haliburton; Golden Jubilee Park, Hamilton; Platinum Jubilee Garden, Queen's Park, Toronto; Queen's Diamond Jubilee Park, Aurora; Queen Elizabeth Park and Community Centre, Oakville; Queen Elizabeth Playground, Kitchener; Queen Elizabeth Sports Field, Mississauga; Queen Elizabeth II Diamond Jubilee Trail, Ottawa; Queen Elizabeth II Gardens, Upper Canada Village, South Dundas; Queen Elizabeth II Gardens, Jackson Park, Windsor; The Queen Elizabeth II Jubilee Garden, Mississauga; Queen Elizabeth II Rose Garden, Grange Park, Toronto; Queen Elizabeth II Rose Garden, Queen's Park, Toronto; Queen Elizabeth II Sports Field and Park, Greater Sudbury; Queen Elizabeth II Wildlands Provincial Park	Coronation Boulevard, Cambridge; Diamond Jubilee Promenade, Toronto; Princess Elizabeth Crescent, Kawartha Lakes; Queen Elizabeth Boulevard, Toronto; Queen Elizabeth Drive, Windsor; Queen Elizabeth Driveway, Ottawa; Queen Elizabeth Street, Greater Sudbury; Queensway, Ottawa	Golden Jubilee Journalism New Media Centre, Sheridan College, Oakville; Princess Elizabeth Public School, Brantford; Princess Elizabeth Public School, Orangeville; Princess Elizabeth Public School, Leamington; Princess Elizabeth Public School, London; Princess Elizabeth Public School, Welland; Princess Elizabeth Public School, Windsor; Queen Elizabeth Academy, Mississauga; Queen Elizabeth Elementary School, Belleville; Queen Elizabeth Collegiate and Vocational Institute, Kingston; Queen Elizabeth Public School, Kitchener; Queen Elizabeth Public School Leamington; Queen Elizabeth Public School, Osahwa; Queen Elizabeth Public School, Ottawa; Queen Elizabeth Public School, Picton; Queen Elizabeth Public School, Renfrew; Queen Elizabeth Public School, Sault Ste. Marie; The Queen Elizabeth School, Perth; Queen Elizabeth II Public School, Chatham; Queen Elizabeth II Public School, Petrolia; Queen Elizabeth II School, Chatham-Kent; Queen Elizabeth School, Perth; Queen Elizabeth Senior Public School, Mississauga; Queen Elizabeth II Public School, Greater Sudbury; Queen Elizabeth II School, Sarnia	Princess Elizabeth Wing, Soldiers' Memorial Hospital, Orillia; Queen Elizabeth Centre, St. Catharines; Queen Elizabeth Park Community and Cultural Centre, Oakville; Queen Elizabeth Theatre, Exhibition Place, Toronto; Queen's Lantern, Canadian Museum of Nature, Ottawa; Queen Elizabeth II Building, Exhibition Place, Toronto
(Prince Edward Island) PE	Platinum Jubilee Garden, Government House, Charlottetown	Queen Elizabeth Drive, Charlottetown; Queen Elizabeth Drive, Morell	Queen Elizabeth Elementary School, Kensington	Queen Elizabeth Hospital, Charlottetown
(Quebec) QC	Parc Reine Elizabeth II, La Pocatière; Place Reine Elizabeth II, Trois-Rivières		Princess Elizabeth Elementary School, Magog; Queen Elizabeth High School, Sept-Îles	Queen Elizabeth Dental Services, Montreal; Queen Elizabeth Hotel, Montreal
(Saskatchewan) SK	Jubilee Rose Garden, Moose Jaw; Platinum Jubilee Garden, Government House, Regina; Queen Elizabeth Jubilee Park, Regina; Queen Elizabeth Sports Field, Saskatoon; Queen Elizabeth Court, Regina; Queen's Golden Jubilee Rose Garden, Moose Jaw	Queen Elizabeth Boulevard, Kamsack; Queen Elizabeth Power Station, Saskatoon	Queen Elizabeth School, Saskatoon	Queen Elizabeth II Court, Regina; Queen Elizabeth II Gardens, Regina; Queen Elizabeth II Wing, Government House, Regina
(Northwest Territories) NT	Queen Elizabeth Islands			
(Nunavut) NU	Coronation Fjord; Coronation Glacier; Platinum Jubilee Garden, Legislative Building, Iqaluit; Queen Elizabeth Islands; Queen Elizabeth Slope; Queen Elizabeth Undersea Rise; Queen Elizabeth Undersea Shelf	Queen Elizabeth Way, Iqaluit		
(Yukon) YK	Platinum Jubilee Garden, Taylor House, Whitehorse			

=== Prince Philip* ===
Prince Philip Other title: The Duke of Edinburgh (1947–2021)
Region	Geographic locations	Civil structures	Schools	Buildings
(Newfoundland and Labrador) NL		Prince Philip Drive, St. John's		
(Saskatchewan) SK		Duke of Edinburgh Way, Regina	Prince Philip School, Saskatoon	

=== Princess Anne ===
Princess Anne Other title: The Princess Royal (1987–present)
Region	Geographic locations	Civil structures	Schools	Buildings
(Ontario) ON	Princess Anne Manor, Toronto	Princess Anne Crescent, Etobicoke; Princess Royal Drive, Mississauga	Princess Anne French Immersion Public School, London; Princess Anne Public School, Sudbury	Princess Anne Entrance at Rideau Hall, Ottawa; Princess Anne Community Centre, South Frontenac

=== Prince Andrew ===
Prince Andrew Other title: The Duke of York (1986–2025)
Region	Geographic locations	Civil structures	Schools	Buildings
(Nova Scotia) NS			Prince Andrew High School, Dartmouth (now Woodlawn High School)	Prince Andrew High School Library, Dartmouth
(Ontario) ON	Duke of York Boulevard, Mississauga; Prince Andrew Court, St. Catharines; Prince Andrew Drive, Caledon; Prince Andrew Place, Toronto		Prince Andrew Public School, Denfield; Prince Andrew Public School, LaSalle (replaced by Legacy Oak Trail Public School)	

=== Prince Edward (1964–present) ===
Prince Edward Other title:The Duke of Edinburgh (2023–present)
Region	Geographic locations	Civil structures	Schools	Buildings
(Saskatchewan) SK	Prince Edward Park, Melfort			Prince Edward Building, Regina

=== Lady Louise Mountbatten-Windsor ===
Lady Louise Mountbatten-Windsor
Region	Geographic locations	Civil structures	Schools	Buildings
(Manitoba) MB	Lake Louise			

=== James Mountbatten-Windsor, Earl of Wessex ===
James Mountbatten-Windsor, Earl of Wessex
Region	Geographic locations	Civil structures	Schools	Buildings
(Manitoba) MB	Lake James			

=== King Charles III ===
King Charles III Other titles: Prince Charles (1948–2022) The Prince of Wales (1958–2022)
Region	Geographic locations	Civil structures	Schools	Buildings
(Alberta) AB	Prince Charles, Edmonton		Prince Charles Elementary School, Edmonton	
(British Columbia) BC		Prince Charles Boulevard, Surrey; Prince Charles Street, Nanaimo	Prince Charles Elementary School, Abbotsford; Prince Charles Secondary School, Creston (renamed Creston Valley Secondary School); Prince Charles Elementary School, Surrey	
(New Brunswick) NB		Prince Charles Street, Miramichi	Prince Charles Elementary School, Saint John	
(Newfoundland and Labrador) NL		Prince of Wales Arena, St. John's	Prince of Wales Collegiate, St. John's	
(Ontario) ON		Prince Charles Street, Georgetown; Prince Charles Street, Mount Forest; Prince Charles Street, Wellington North; Prince Charles Street, Ottawa; Prince of Wales Drive, Cobourg; Prince of Wales Drive, Mississauga; Prince of Wales Drive, Nepean; Prince of Wales Drive, Ottawa; Prince Charles Drive, Toronto	Prince Charles Elementary School, Belleville; Prince Charles Public School, Newmarket; Prince of Wales Public School, Brockville	
(Prince Edward Island) PEI	Prince of Wales and Duchess of Cornwall Trail System, Bonshaw Provincial Park		Prince of Wales Campus, Holland College, Charlottetown	
(Quebec) QC		Prince-Charles Street, Dorval; Prince-Charles Street, Saint-Hubert		
(Saskatchewan) SK		Prince of Wales Drive, Regina	Prince Charles School, Prince Albert	Prince of Wales Cultural and Recreation Centre, Assiniboia; Prince of Wales Entrance, Saskatchewan Legislative Building, Regina
(Northwest Territories) NT				Prince of Wales Northern Heritage Centre
(Nunavut) NU	Prince Charles Island			

=== Diana, Princess of Wales* ===
Diana, Princess of Wales
Region	Geographic locations	Civil structures	Schools	Buildings
(Ontario) ON				Princess of Wales Theatre, Toronto
(Saskatchewan) SK	Princess Diana Multi-District Park, Saskatoon			

=== Queen Camilla* ===
Queen Camilla Other title: Duchess of Cornwall (2005–2022)
Region	Geographic locations	Civil structures	Schools	Buildings
(Prince Edward Island) PEI	Prince of Wales and Duchess of Cornwall Trail System, Bonshaw Provincial Park			

=== Prince William (1982–present) ===
Prince William Other titles: The Duke of Cambridge (2011–present) The Prince of Wales (2022–present)
Region	Geographic locations	Civil structures	Schools	Buildings
(Ontario) ON		Prince William Boulevard, Bowmanville	Duke of Cambridge Public School, Bowmanville	

=== Various ===
Various Named for multiple members of the Royal Family
Region	Geographic locations	Civil structures	Schools	Buildings
(Manitoba) MB		Royal Road, Portage-la-Prairie		
(Quebec) QC				Her/His Majesty's Theatre, Montreal (demolished)

== See also ==
- Royal monuments in Canada
- Viceregal eponyms in Canada
- Royal eponyms in Australia
