= St George River =

St George River may refer to:

== Australia ==
- St George River, a watercourse in Queensland
- St George River, a watercourse in Victoria

== Canada ==
- Saint-Georges River, a watercourse in Canada

== United States ==
- St. George River, a watercourse in Maine
