= Royal eponyms in Australia =

In Australia, various geographic locations and buildings are named after several members of the British royal family. These names highlight Australia's status as a constitutional monarchy under the British Crown and, since 1931, the Australian Crown. Those who married into the royal family are indicated by an asterisk (*).

== Eponymous royalty ==
=== Queen Elizabeth I ===
Queen Elizabeth I Colloquially: Good Queen Bess
Region	Geographic locations	Civil structures	Buildings
(Queensland) QLD		Queen Bess Street, Woolloongabba	
(Victoria (state)) VIC			'Queen Bess Row', 72 Hotham Street, East Melbourne

=== King James VI and I ===
King James VI and I
Region	Geographic locations	Civil structures	Buildings
(Queensland) QLD		King James Court, Paradise Point	

=== King Charles I ===
King Charles I
Region	Geographic locations	Civil structures	Buildings
(Queensland) QLD		King Charles Drive, Paradise Point	

=== Queen Anne ===
Queen Anne
Region	Geographic locations	Civil structures	Buildings
(Queensland) QLD		Queen Anne Court, Paradise Point	
(Tasmania) TAS		Queen Anne Street, Oatlands	

=== King George III ===
King George III Other titles: Prince George (1738–1760) The Duke of Lancaster (1760–1820) Elector of Hanover (Brunswick-Lüneburg) (1760–1820)
Region	Geographic locations	Civil structures	Buildings
(New South Wales) NSW	Lake George; Georges Plains	George Street, Sydney; George Street, Windsor	
(Western Australia) WA	King George Sound		
(Tasmania) TAS	King George Sound		

=== Queen Charlotte* ===
Queen Charlotte
Region	Geographic locations	Civil structures	Buildings
(New South Wales) NSW	Queen Charlottes Creek		
(Queensland) QLD		Queen Charlotte Court, Mudgeeraba	

=== Prince Henry (1745-1790) ===
Prince Henry, Duke of Cumberland and Strathearn Other title: The Duke of Cumberland and Strathearn (1766–1790)
Region	Geographic locations	Civil structures	Buildings
(New South Wales) NSW	Cumberland County; Cumberland Plain		

=== Prince Frederick (1763–1827) ===
Prince Frederick Other title: The Duke of York and Albany (1784–1827)
Region	Geographic locations	Civil structures	Buildings
(Western Australia) WA	Albany; Prince Frederick Harbour		

=== Princess Charlotte (1766-1828) ===
Charlotte Other title: Princess Royal (1789-1828)
Region	Geographic locations	Civil structures	Buildings
(Western Australia) WA	Princess Royal Harbour	Princess Royal Fortress (Albany Forts); Princess Royal Drive, Albany	

=== King George IV ===
King George IV Other title: The Duke of Cornwall (1762–1820) Royal house: House of Guelph
Region	Geographic locations	Civil structures	Buildings
(New South Wales) NSW			King George IV Inn, Picton
(Western Australia) WA	Port George IV		

=== Queen Caroline* ===
Queen Caroline
Region	Geographic locations	Civil structures	Buildings
(Victoria (state)) VIC	Brunswick		

=== Princess Charlotte (1796-1817) ===
Princess Charlotte Other title: Princess of Wales (1816-1817)
Region	Geographic locations	Civil structures	Buildings
(Queensland) QLD	Princess Charlotte Bay		
(Tasmania) TAS	Claremont		
(Western Australia) WA	Augusta		

=== King William IV ===
King William IV Other titles: Prince William Henry (1765–1830) The Duke of Clarence and St. Andrews (1765–1830)
Region	Geographic locations	Civil structures	Buildings
(South Australia) SA		King William Street, Adelaide	
(Victoria (state)) VIC	Williamstown	Clarence Street, Geelong West; William Street, Melbourne	

=== Queen Adelaide* ===
Queen Adelaide
Region	Geographic locations	Civil structures	Buildings
(Northern Territory) NT	Adelaide River		
(South Australia) SA	Adelaide		
(Victoria (state)) VIC		Queen Street, Melbourne	

=== Queen Victoria ===
Queen Victoria Other title: Empress of India (1876–1901)
Region	Geographic locations	Civil structures	Buildings
(Australian Capital Territory) ACT		Queen Victoria Terrace	
(New South Wales) NSW	Queens Park, the urban park; Queens Park, the Sydney suburb located adjacent to the urban park; Queen's Square, Sydney; Empress Falls, Blue Mountains	Queen Victoria Street, Bexley; Queen Victoria Street, Drummoyne; Victoria Street, Ashfield; Statue of Queen Victoria, Sydney; Statue of Queen Victoria by Joseph Boehm; Victoria Bridge (Penrith); Victoria Bridge, Picton; Victoria Road, Sydney	'One Victoria' (1-7 Victoria St, Ashfield); Queen Victoria Building, Sydney
(Norfolk Island) NF	Queen Victoria Memorial Gardens		
(Northern Territory) NT	Victoria River; Victoria Settlement, Port Essington		
(Queensland) QLD	Queens Garden, Brisbane; Queens Park (or Victoria Park), Mackay; State of Queensland; Victoria Bridge, Brisbane; Victoria Bridge, Townsville; Victoria Creek, Silver Creek; Victoria Park, Brisbane; Victoria Park, Broadbeach; Victoria Park, Gladstone; Victoria Park, Rockhampton; Victoria Park, Warwick; Victoria Point; Victoria Plains; Victoria Plantation	Statue of Queen Victoria, Queens Gardens, Brisbane; Queen Street, Brisbane; Queen Street, Hughenden; Queen Street, Jandowae; Queen Street, Roma; Victoria Avenue, Broadbeach; Victoria Avenue, Margate; Victoria Parade, Rockhampton; Victoria Road, Gympie; Victoria Street, Biggenden; Victoria Street, Cardwell; Victoria Street, Cooran; Victoria Street, Duaringa; Victoria Street, Eton; Victoria Street, Goombungee; Victoria Street, Hughenden; Victoria Street, Inglewood; Victoria Street, Mackay; Victoria Street, Mirani; Victoria Street, Morven; Victoria Street, St George; Victoria Street, Silkwood; Victoria Street, Warwick; Victoria Street, Windorah; Victoria Terrace, Kings Beach	Victoria Barracks, Brisbane
(South Australia) SA	Great Victoria Desert (also in Western Australia); Lake Alexandrina; Port Victoria; Victoria Square, Adelaide; Victoria Park, Adelaide	Queen Street, Kapunda; Queen Street, Peterborough; Victoria Crescent, Port Lincoln; Victoria Grove, Clare; Victoria Parade, Bordertown; Victoria Parade, Port Augusta; Victoria Road, Black Springs; Victoria Road, Clare; Victoria Road, Hamilton; Victoria Road, Swan Reach; Victoria Street, Gumeracha; Victoria Street, Laura; Victoria Street, Mannum; Victoria Street, Peterborough; Victoria Street, Port Pirie; Victoria Street, Swan Reach; Victoria Street, Victor Harbor; Victoria Street, Wallaroo; Victoria Street, Yorketown; Victoria Terrace, Port Victoria	
(Tasmania) TAS	Queenstown, West Coast; Queen River, West Coast; Queens Beach, Hobart (also known as Bellerive Beach); Victoria Dock, Hobart; Victoria Valley; Victoria Valley Falls (or Victoria Falls), Victoria Valley	Victoria Avenue, Dennes Point; Victoria Bridge, Devonport; Victoria Esplanade, Bellerive; Victoria Parade, Devonport; Victoria Street, George Town; Victoria Street, Hobart; Victoria Street, Fingal; Victoria Street, Kingston Beach; Victoria Street, Oatlands; Victoria Street, Pontville; Victoria Street, Ranelagh; Victoria Street, Richmond; Victoria Street, Scottsdale; Victoria Street, Sheffield; Victoria Street, Stanley; Victoria Street, Swansea; Victoria Street, Triabunna; Victoria Street, Tullah; Victoria Street, Tunbridge; Victoria Street, Ulverstone; Victoria Street, Youngtown	Queen Victoria Museum and Art Gallery, Launceston
(Victoria (state)) VIC	Jubilee Park, Woodford; Queenscliff; Queens Park, Lorne; Queens Park, Moonee Ponds; Queens Park, Newtown; Queen Victoria Gardens, Melbourne; State of Victoria; Victoria Dock, Melbourne; Victoria Falls, Cobungra; Victoria River	Queen Street, Loch; Queen Street, Myrtleford; Queen Street, Point Lonsdale (originally; renamed to Nicholas Court); Queen Street, Queenscliff; Queen Victoria Market, Melbourne; Queen Victoria Street, Newington; Victoria Crescent, St Albans; Victoria Lane, Maryborough; Victoria Parade, Kilmore; Victoria Road, Loch; Victoria Street, Bairnsdale; Victoria Street, Ballarat East; Victoria Street, Blackwood; Victoria Street, Brighton; Victoria Street, Brunswick; Victoria Street, Carisbrook; Victoria Street, Creswick; Victoria Street, Darley; Victoria Street, Daylesford; Victoria Street, Drouin; Victoria Street, Footscray; Victoria Street, Hastings; Victoria Street, Kaniva; Victoria Street, Kerang; Victoria Street, Mansfield; Victoria Street, Maryborough; Victoria Street, Mooroopna; Victoria Street, Nhill; Victoria Street, North Geelong; Victoria Street, Port Albert; Victoria Street, Port Fairy; Victoria Street, Pyramid Hill; Victoria Street, Rochester; Victoria Street, Sebastopol; Victoria Street, Seymour; Victoria Street, Shepparton; Victoria Street, South Geelong; Victoria Street, St Kilda; Victoria Street, Trentham; Victoria Street, Warragul; Victoria Street, Woodford; Victoria Terrace, Belmont	Queen's College (University of Melbourne); Queen Victoria Hospital, Melbourne; QV
(Western Australia) WA	Great Victoria Desert (also in South Australia); Queens Park, Geraldton; Victoria Park, Kalgoorlie; Victoria Park, Perth; Victoria Quay, Fremantle; Victoria Street railway station; Victoria Square, Busselton; Victoria Square, Perth	Queen Street, Busselton; Queen Street, Nulsen; Queen Victoria Street, Fremantle; Queen Victoria Street, Leonora; Victoria Avenue, Perth; Victoria Highway (derived from Victoria River, Northern Territory); Victoria Street, Bunbury; Victoria Street, Cue; Victoria Street, Geraldton; Victoria Street, Mosman Park; Victoria Street, Nulsen	Victoria Hall, Fremantle; Victoria Pavilion, Fremantle

=== Prince Albert* ===
Prince Albert Other title: Prince of Saxe-Coburg and Gotha (1819–1857)
Region	Geographic locations	Civil structures	Buildings
(Australian Capital Territory) ACT			Albert Hall, Parkes
(New South Wales) NSW	Lake Albert		
(South Australia) SA	Albert Park	Albert Parade, Bordertown; Albert Place, Victor Harbor; Albert Street, Gumeracha; Albert Street, Mannum; Prince Albert Street, Albert Park	
(Tasmania) TAS	Alberton; Princes Park, Hobart	Albert Street, Fingal; Albert Street, Kingston Beach; Albert Street, Stanley	Albert Hall, Launceston
(Victoria (state)) VIC	Alberton; Port Albert; Albert Park; Albert Park Lake; Albert River	Albert Crescent, St Albans; Albert Lane, Maryborough; Albert Road, Drouin; Albert Road, Loch; Albert Street, Bairnsdale; Albert Street, Ballarat; Albert Street, Blackwood; Albert Street, Brighton; Albert Street, Brunswick; Albert Street, Carisbrook; Albert Street, Creswick; Albert Street, Darley; Albert Street, Daylesford; Albert Street, Footscray; Albert Street, Geelong West; Albert Street, Hastings; Albert Street, Kaniva; Albert Street, Kerang; Albert Street, Kilmore; Albert Street, Maryborough; Albert Street, Mooroopna; Albert Street, Mornington; Albert Street, Myrtleford; Albert Street, Nhill; Albert Street, Point Lonsdale; Albert Street, Port Albert; Albert Street, Port Fairy; Albert Street, Pyramid Hill; Albert Street, Rochester; Albert Street, Sebastopol; Albert Street, Seymour; Albert Street, Shepparton; Albert Street, St Kilda; Albert Street, Trentham; Albert Street, Warragul; Albert Street, Woodford; Albert Terrace, Belmont; Little Albert Street, Pyramid Hill; Princes Bridge, Geelong	Prince Albert Hotel, Williamstown
(Western Australia) WA		Albert Street, South Perth	

=== Princess Victoria (1840–1901) ===
Princess Victoria Other title: Princess Royal (1841–1901)
Region	Geographic locations	Civil structures	Buildings
(Western Australia) WA	Princess Royal		

=== Princess Alice ===
Princess Alice
Region	Geographic locations	Civil structures	Schools	Buildings
(New South Wales) NSW		Alice Street, Grafton		
(Queensland) QLD		Alice Street, Brisbane; Alice Street, Atherton		

=== Prince Alfred ===
Prince Alfred
Region	Geographic locations	Civil structures	Buildings
(New South Wales) NSW	Prince Alfred Park, Surry Hills; Prince Alfred Square, Parramatta; Prince's Rock, Blue Mountains	Royal Prince Alfred Yacht Club	Royal Prince Alfred Hospital
(South Australia) SA			Prince Alfred College
(Tasmania) TAS	Prince's Square, Launceston		
(Victoria (state)) VIC	Alfredton	Alfred Street, Mornington; Prince Alfred Street, Riddells Creek; Prince Alfred Street, Talbot	Alfred Hall, Ballarat; The Alfred Hospital; Prince Alfred Hotel, Richmond

=== Princess Helena ===
Princess Helena
Region	Geographic locations	Civil structures	Buildings
(Queensland) QLD	Augusta Street, Mirani; Helena Street, Mirani		

=== Princess Louise (1848–1939) ===
Princess Louise Full name: Louisa Caroline Alberta
Region	Geographic locations	Civil structures	Buildings
(Queensland) QLD		Alberta Street, Mirani; Caroline Street, Mirani; Louise Street, Atherton; Louise Street, Mirani	

=== The Duke of Argyll* ===
The Duke of Argyll Other title: The Marquess of Lorne (1847–1900)
Region	Geographic locations	Civil structures	Buildings
(Victoria (state)) VIC	Lorne		

=== Prince Leopold ===
Prince Leopold Other title: The Duke of Albany (1881–1884)
Region	Geographic locations	Civil structures	Buildings
(Victoria (state)) VIC	Leopold		Leopold Hotel, Ararat

=== Princess Beatrice ===
Princess Beatrice Full name: Beatrice Mary Victoria Feodore
Region	Geographic locations	Civil structures	Buildings
(Queensland) QLD		Beatrice Street, Atherton	

=== King Edward VII ===
King Edward VII Full name: Albert Edward Other titles: The Prince of Wales (1841–1901) The Duke of Rothesay (1841–1901) Baron of Renfrew (1901–1910)
Region	Geographic locations	Civil structures	Buildings
(Australian Capital Territory) ACT		King Edward Terrace, Parkes	
(Queensland) QLD	King Edward Park, Brisbane	Edward Street, Brisbane	
(Victoria (state)) VIC		Princes Bridge	

=== Queen Alexandra* ===
Queen Alexandra Other title: Princess Alexandra (1844–1901)
Region	Geographic locations	Civil structures	Buildings
(Queensland) QLD	Alexandra Headland		Queen Alexandra Home
(South Australia) SA	Electoral district of Alexandra		
(Victoria (state)) VIC	Alexandra; Alexandra Gardens, Ararat; Alexandra Gardens, Melbourne; Alexandra Gardens, Kew		
(Western Australia) WA	Queens Park		

=== Princess Maud ===
Princess Maud Other title: Queen Maud (1905–1938)
Region	Geographic locations	Civil structures	Buildings
(Queensland) QLD	Maud Street, Mirani		

=== King George V ===
King George V Other titles: The Duke of York (1892–1910) The Prince of Wales (1901–1910)
Region	Geographic locations	Civil structures	Buildings
(Australian Capital Territory) ACT		King George Terrace, Parkes	
(Queensland) QLD	King George Square		

=== Queen Mary* ===
Queen Mary
Region	Geographic locations	Civil structures	Buildings
(Queensland) QLD	Queen Mary Falls		

=== King Edward VIII ===
King Edward VIII Other titles: Prince Edward (1894–1936), (1936–1972) The Prince of Wales (1910–1936)
Region	Geographic locations	Civil structures	Buildings
(New South Wales) NSW		Princes Highway	
(South Australia) SA		Princes Highway	
(Victoria (state)) VIC		Princes Freeway; Princes Highway	

=== Prince Henry ===
Prince Henry Other title: The Duke of Gloucester
Region	Geographic locations	Civil structures	Buildings
(Queensland) QLD	Prince Henry Heights		
(New South Wales) NSW	Prince Henry Cliff Walk, Blue Mountains		Prince Henry Hospital, Sydney
(Victoria (state)) VIC			Prince Henry's Institute of Medical Research

=== King George VI ===
King George VI Other title: The Duke of York (1920–1936)
Region	Geographic locations	Civil structures	Buildings
(New South Wales) NSW	Duke and Duchess of York Lookout, Katoomba		

=== Queen Elizabeth* ===
Queen Elizabeth
Region	Geographic locations	Civil structures	Buildings
(New South Wales) NSW	Duke and Duchess of York Lookout, Katoomba		

=== Princess Margaret ===
Princess Margaret
Region	Geographic locations	Civil structures	Buildings
(Victoria (state)) VIC	Princess Margaret Rose Cave		

=== Queen Elizabeth II ===
Queen Elizabeth II Other title: Princess Elizabeth (1926–1952)
Region	Geographic locations	Civil structures	Buildings
(Australian Capital Territory) ACT	Queen Elizabeth II Island	Queen Elizabeth Terrace	
(Queensland) QLD		Queen Elizabeth Drive, Eatons Hill; Queen Elizabeth Drive, Cooloola Cove; Queen Elizabeth Drive, Berserker; Queen Elizabeth Drive, Dysart; Queen Elizabeth Drive, Warner; Queen Elizabeth Street, Tambo	Queen Elizabeth II Jubilee Hospital; Queen Elizabeth II Courts of Law, Brisbane
(New South Wales) NSW		Queen Elizabeth II Rehabilitation Centre, Camperdown; Queen Elizabeth Drive, Armidale; Queen Elizabeth Drive, Bondi; Queen Elizabeth Drive, Mount Keira; Queen Elizabeth Drive, Wentworth Falls; Queen Elizabeth Drive, Coraki; Queen Elizabeth Lookout, Katoomba	Queen Elizabeth II Grandstand, Randwick Racecourse
(Norfolk Island) NI		Queen Elizabeth Avenue	
(South Australia) SA	Elizabeth	Princess Elizabeth Playground, Adelaide; Queen Elizabeth Drive, Whyalla; Queen Elizabeth Drive, Barmera; Queen Elizabeth Drive, Monash	The Queen Elizabeth Hospital, Adelaide
(Tasmania) TAS	Elizabeth Town		
(Victoria (state)) VIC	Lake Elizabeth, Forrest	Queen Elizabeth Village Hostel, Wendouree; Queen Elizabeth Drive, Tallangatta; Queen and Elizabeth Streets (adjacent streets), Hamilton	Queen Elizabeth Centre, Ballarat; Princess Elizabeth Junior School For Deaf Children, 90 Elgar Rd, Burwood
(Western Australia) WA		Elizabeth Quay; Queen Elizabeth Avenue, Bovell; Queen Elizabeth Avenue, Chapman Hill; Queen Elizabeth Avenue, Vasse	Queen Elizabeth II Medical Centre, Nedlands

=== Prince Philip* ===
Prince Philip Other title: The Duke of Edinburgh (1947–2021)
Region	Geographic locations	Civil structures	Buildings
(Norfolk Island) NI		Prince Philip Drive	
(Western Australia) WA		Prince Philip Drive, South Bunbury	

=== King Charles III ===
King Charles III Other titles: Prince Charles (1948–2022) The Prince of Wales (1958–2022)
Region	Geographic locations	Civil structures	Buildings
(Queensland) QLD		Prince Charles Avenue, Seaforth	The Prince Charles Hospital
(New South Wales) NSW		Prince Charles Parade, Kurnell; Prince Charles Road, Frenchs Forest; Prince Charles Road, Belrose; Prince of Wales Lookout, Katoomba	
(South Australia) SA		Prince Charles Street, Morphett Vale; Prince Charles Street, Elizabeth; Prince Charles Avenue, Tanunda	
(Victoria (state)) VIC		Prince and Charles Streets (adjacent streets), Hamilton; Prince Charles Street, Clayton	King Charles III Hotel, Rainbow

=== Diana, Princess of Wales* ===
Diana, Princess of Wales
Region	Geographic locations	Civil structures	Buildings
(Queensland) QLD	Princess Diana Park, Collingwood Park		

=== Prince William (1982–present) ===
Prince William Other titles: The Duke of Cambridge (2011–present) The Prince of Wales (2022–present)
Region	Geographic locations	Civil structures	Buildings
(New South Wales) NSW		Prince William Drive, Seven Hills	Prince William Wing, St George Hospital (Sydney)
(Victoria (state)) VIC	'Prince William Trees', Evatt Park, Lakes Entrance		

== See also ==
- Royal monuments in Australia
- Royal eponyms in Canada
