= Royal monuments in Canada =

In Canada, a number of monuments have been erected to honour royal individuals, whether a member of the past French royal family, British royal family, or present Canadian royal family, thus reflecting the country's status as a constitutional monarchy under the Canadian Crown.

== Alberta ==
(Alberta)
Monument	Image	Location	Individual honoured
Statue		Legislative Building, Edmonton	Queen Victoria
Statue		Legislative Building grounds, Edmonton	Princess Louise, Duchess of Argyll
Stained glass window		Legislative Building grounds, Edmonton	Queen Elizabeth II

== British Columbia ==
(British Columbia)
Monument	Image	Location	Individual honoured
Queen Victoria monument		Stanley Park, Vancouver	Queen Victoria
Statue		Parliament Buildings grounds, Victoria	Queen Victoria
Stained glass window		Parliament Buildings, Victoria	Queen Victoria
Fountain		Vancouver Art Gallery, Vancouver	King Edward VII
Bell		Christ Church Cathedral, Victoria	King George V
Bell		Christ Church Cathedral, Victoria	Queen Mary
Statue		University of British Columbia, Vancouver	King George VI
Statue		Beacon Hill Park, Victoria	Queen Elizabeth II
Bell		Christ Church Cathedral, Victoria	William, Prince of Wales

== Manitoba ==
(Manitoba)
Monument	Image	Location	Individual honoured
Statue		legislative Building grounds, Winnipeg	Queen Victoria*
Statue		Manitoba Museum, Winnipeg	Queen Elizabeth II
Statue		Government House grounds, Winnipeg	Queen Elizabeth II*

The statue of Queen Victoria at the Manitoba Legislative Building and the statue of Queen Elizabeth II at Government House were torn down by a mob on July 1, 2021, in a protest about residential schools. The statue of Elizabeth II was repaired and reinstalled on June 2, 2023, though the statue of Queen Victoria was damaged beyond repair.

== New Brunswick ==
(New Brunswick)
Monument	Image	Location	Individual honoured
Statue		River Glade	Queen Victoria

== Ontario ==
(Ontario)
Monument	Image	Location	Individual honoured
Stained glass window		Christ Church Royal Chapel, Deseronto	Queen Anne
Statue		Gore Park, Hamilton	Queen Victoria
Statue		Victoria Park, Kitchener	Queen Victoria
Statue		Parliament Hill, Ottawa	Queen Victoria
Statue		Library of Parliament, Centre Block, Ottawa	Queen Victoria
Statue		Queen's Park, Toronto	Queen Victoria
Stained glass window		St. Bartholomew's Anglican Church, Ottawa	Prince Arthur, Duke of Connaught and Strathearn
Equestrian statue		Queen's Park, Toronto	King Edward VII
Queen Alexandra Gates		Philosopher's Walk, Toronto	King Edward VII and Queen Alexandra
Stained glass window		St. James Cathedral, Toronto	King George V
Princes' Gates		Exhibition Place, Toronto	King Edward VIII and Prince George, Duke of Kent
Statue		Queen Victoria Park, Niagara Falls	King George VI
Coronation Park		Toronto	King George VI
Queen Elizabeth Way Monument		Sir Casimir Gzowski Park, Toronto	Queen Elizabeth, the Queen Mother
Princess Margaret Fountain		Exhibition Place, Toronto	Princess Margaret, Countess of Snowdon
Equestrian statue		Parliament Hill, Ottawa	Queen Elizabeth II
Stained glass window		Rideau Hall, Ottawa	Queen Elizabeth II
Silver Jubilee stained glass window		Cathedral Church of St. James, Toronto	Queen Elizabeth II
Diamond Jubilee stained glass window		Centre Block, Ottawa	Queen Elizabeth II, Queen Victoria
Statue		Queen's Park, Toronto	Queen Elizabeth II

== Quebec ==
(Quebec)
Monument	Image	Location	Individual honoured
Bust		Place Royale, Quebec City	King Louis XIV
George III Monument		Place d'Armes, Montreal	King George III
Victoria Memorial		Victoria Square, Montreal	Queen Victoria
Lion of Belfort		Dorchester Square, Montreal	Queen Victoria
Queen Victoria Monument		McGill University, Montreal	Queen Victoria
Edward VII Monument		Phillips Square, Montreal	King Edward VII

== Saskatchewan ==
(Saskatchewan)
Monument	Image	Location	Individual honoured
Equestrian statue		Legislative Building grounds, Regina	Queen Elizabeth II

== See also ==
- Royal monuments in Australia
- Royal eponyms in Canada
- List of National Historic Sites of Canada
