= Coronation Park (Toronto) =

Park and veteran's memorial in Toronto, Ontario

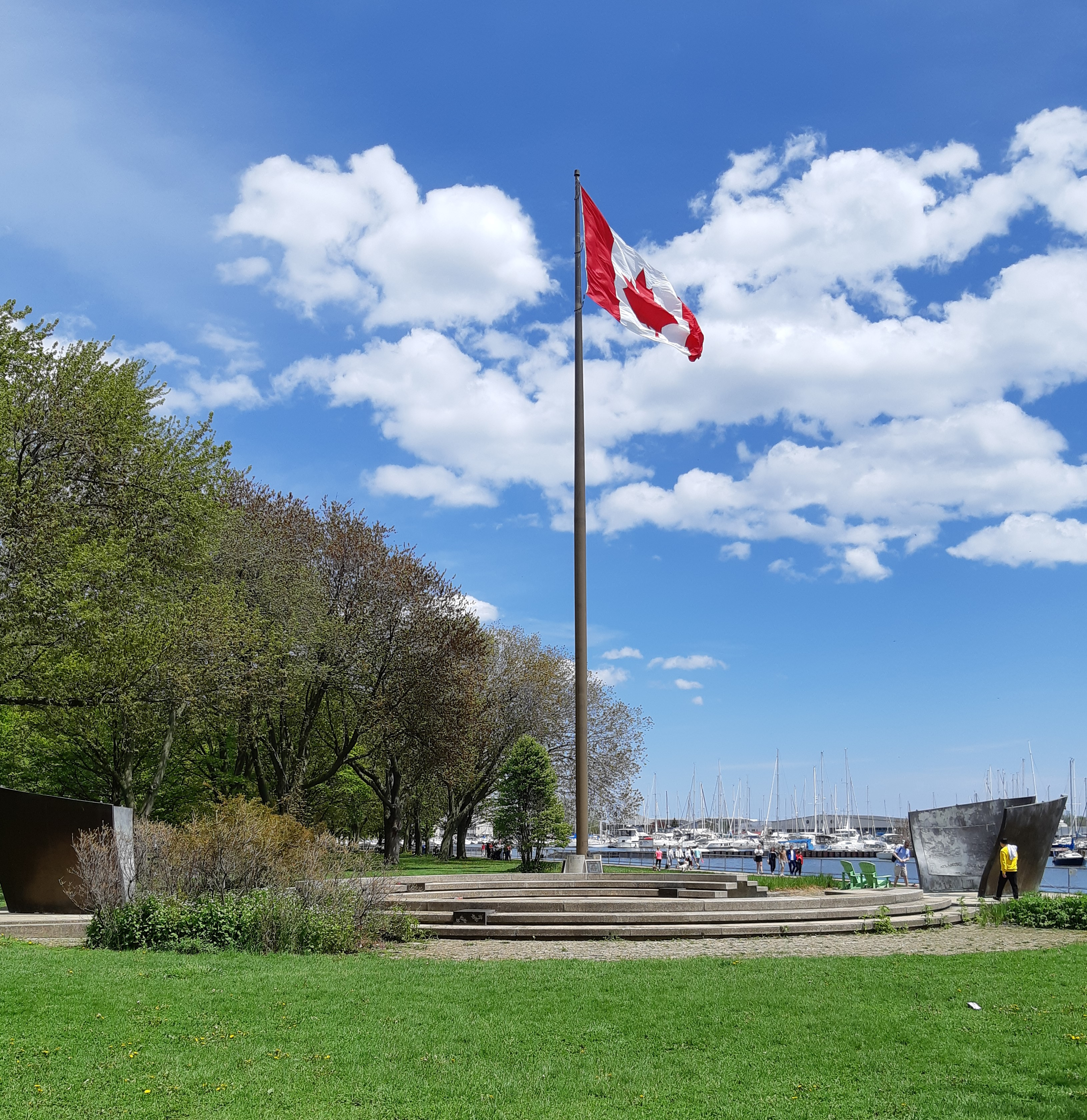
- View of Victory Peace Monument

- Location within Toronto
- Interactive map of Coronation Park
- Type: Urban park, Memorial
- Coordinates: 43°37′59″N 79°24′22″W
- Area: 9 acres (3.6 ha)
- Created: 1937
- Owner: City of Toronto
- Operator: Toronto Parks, Forestry & Recreation

Coronation Park is a park and veteran's memorial in Toronto, Ontario, built to mark the coronation of King George VI in 1937. Most trees are planted to honour the Canadian men and women who participated in the First World War and earlier wars, while others commemorate subsequent coronations of Canadian monarchs. Constructed on landfill on the shore of Lake Ontario during the Great Depression, many workers on relief were used. The park also has the Victory-Peace monument, located at the water's edge. To the east is HMCS York, the naval barracks; to the north is Fort York and the Fort York Armoury; and, to the west, is Exhibition Place, once the site of New Fort York.

== History ==
The Toronto Harbour Commission regularly dredged the bottom of Toronto Harbour to keep it at navigation depth. In exchange for the municipal government of Toronto paying for navigation improvements, the Commission deposited six acres (2.4 ha) of sand along the lakeshore, at the foot of Strachan Avenue, to 1,000 feet (300 m) east, between the existing seawall and shoreline, and the city would take possession of the new land for park purposes. The CA$112,000 ($2.39 million in 2025 dollars) project was approved by the Toronto Board of Control in December 1934.

Construction began in the spring of 1935. One of the project's objectives was to provide work to unemployed workers on welfare; Toronto was suffering through the Great Depression at the time, with 23 per cent of the population on relief. Seventy-five per cent of the workers were registered with the Department of Public Welfare. The park's construction was hard labour; While steam shovels did the dredging, the soil was moved by wheelbarrow. One worker collapsed and three horses died during the process.

The park was completed in time for the planting of trees on May 12, 1937, the day of King George VI's coronation, which was a public holiday in Toronto. Some trees commemorate each regiment of the Canadian Expeditionary Forces in the First World War and one—the King's Oak, or Royal Oak—is for Canada's monarch and commander-in-chief at the time, King George VI. All the trees are arranged in rings aroung the King's Oak; the innermost ring of oak trees, known as the Empire Circle, represents Canada, Australia, New Zealand, India, South Africa, the United Kingdom, and the Crown Colonies, while on either side of the ring, to the east and west, are separate groves of maple trees representing the 1st, 2nd, 3rd, and 4th Canadian divisions, Siberian troops, and Corp Troops. At north, the Imperial Service triangle of trees represents the Royal Canadian Navy, Royal Canadian Air Force, and Canadian Army and the Corps Troops trees remember Canadian nursing sisters and veterans of the Second Boer War, the North-West Rebellion, and the Fenian Raids of 1866. A total of 144 trees were donated by the Toronto chapter of Men of the Trees. A member of that group, F.E Robson, along with Thomas Hobbs and Andrew Gillespie of the Toronto Ex-Serviceman's Coronation Committee, conceived of planting trees as a memorial. The idea was approved by Toronto Board of Control and the Coronation Park Advisory Committee supervised details of the plantings. Hobbs died in service in 1940 and a small cairn in his memory was placed in the park.

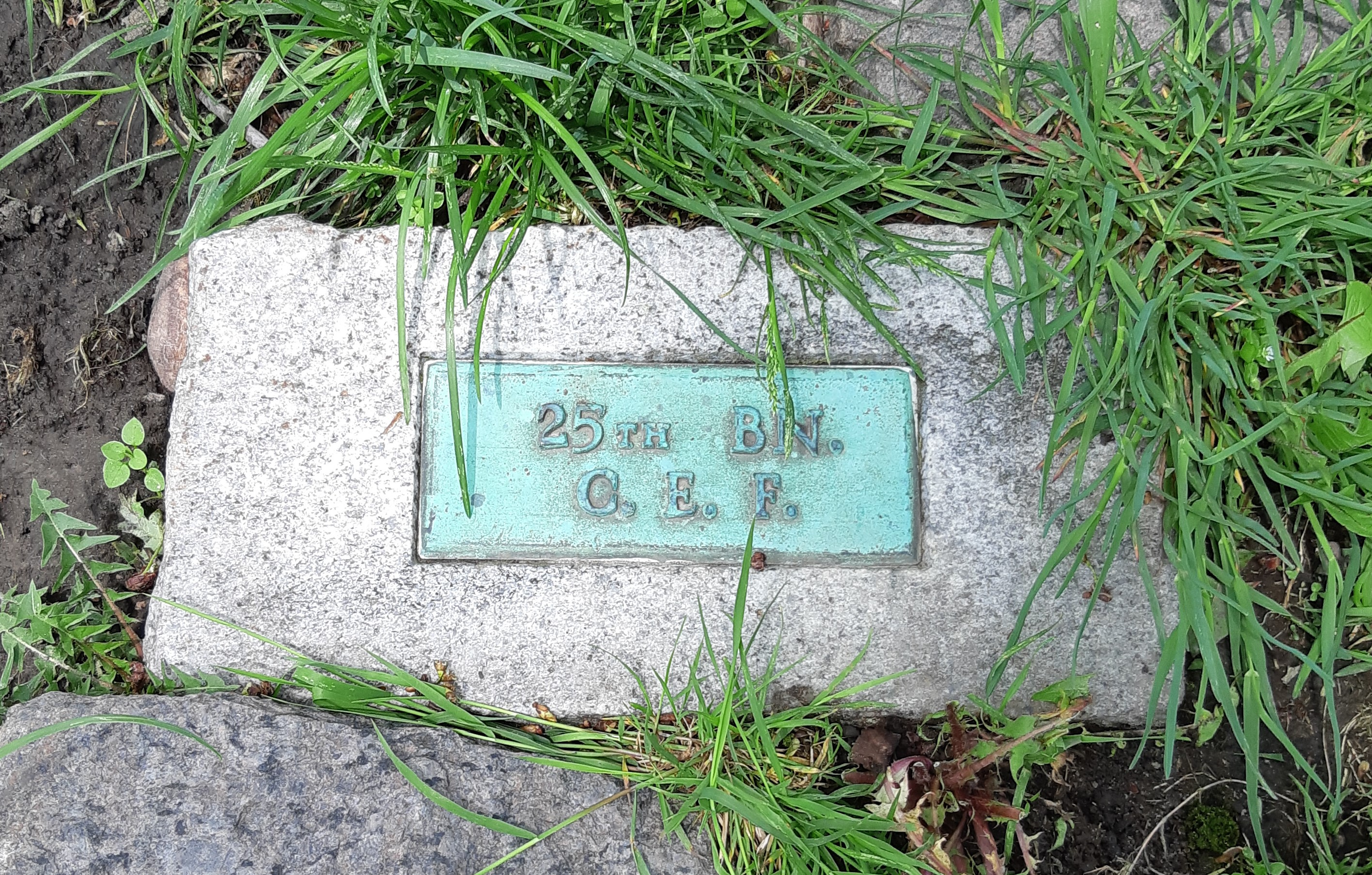
A memorial marker adjacent to one of the trees in Coronation Park

One year later, on August 1, as part of a large reunion of First World War veterans, each tree had a granite stone and plaque installed next to it, each describing the regiment the tree represented. The plaque for the Royal Oak, planted by Justice John A. Hope, was unveiled by Sir William Mulock, former Chief Justice of the Supreme Court of Ontario. Veterans also donated park benches in 1938.

During the royal tour of Canada by King George VI and Queen Elizabeth in 1939: a tree was planted for every public and separate school in Toronto, resulting in 123 maples being set along Remembrance Drive, each placed as the royal car passed by. Another 20 trees were planted on the occasion of the 2010 G20 Toronto summit.

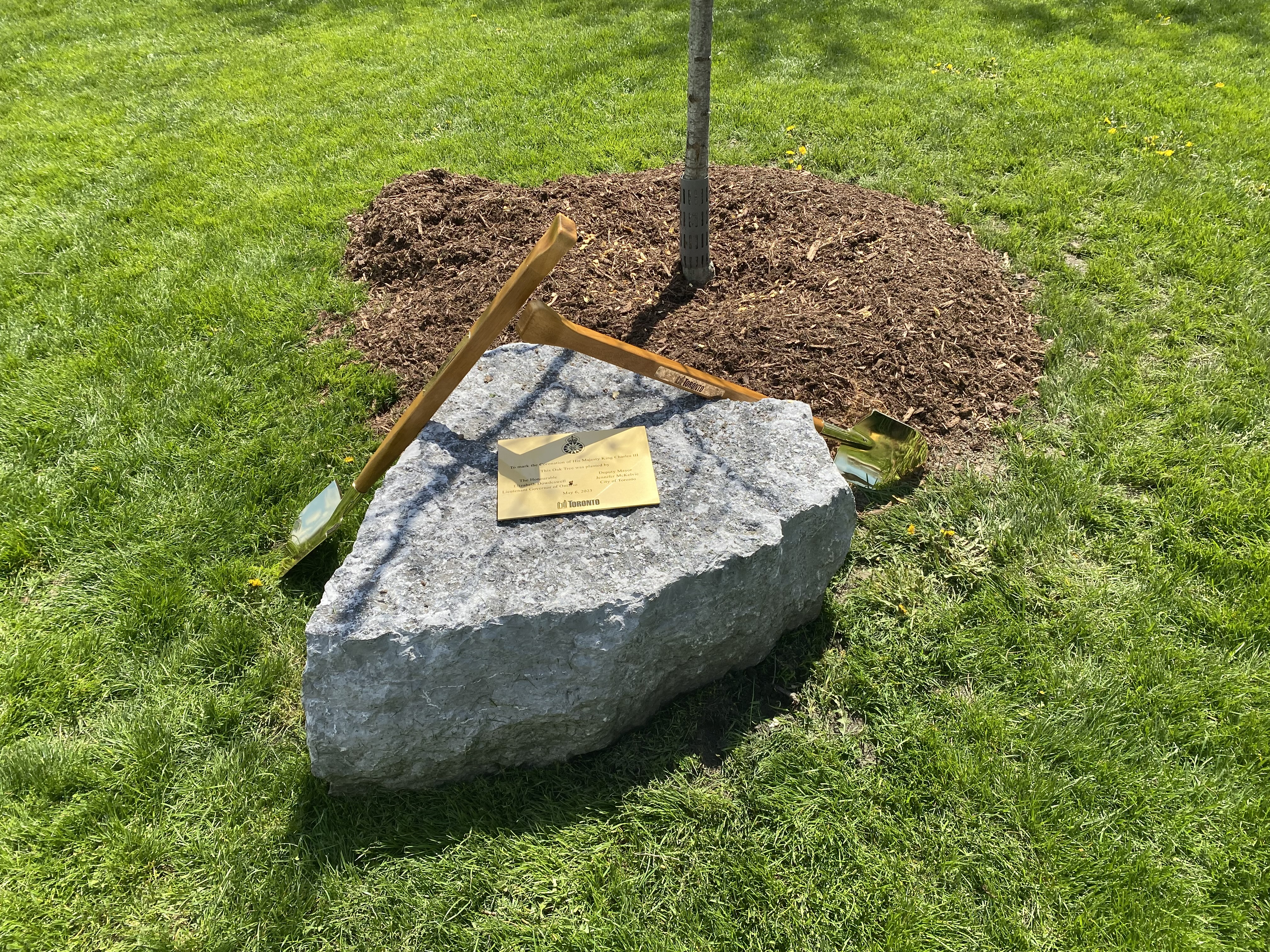
The stone and plaque next to the oak tree planted in Coronation Park to commemorate the coronation of King Charles III

In honour of the coronation of King Charles III on May 6, 2023, as well as the King's commitment to environmental protection, the city planted another oak tree in Coronation Park, beside which is a plaque displaying the Canadian coronation emblem. Lieutenant Governor of Ontario Elizabeth Dowdeswell and Deputy Mayor of Toronto Jennifer McKelvie performed the ceremonial planting and sprinkled tobacco around the tree at the ceremonial planting, signifying the connection of people to nature and one another, Charles' belief in the connection of people to the land and water, and the relationship between Canada's Crown and indigenous peoples.

Coronation Park was twice threatened by redevelopment plans: During the design stages of the Gardiner Expressway, it was suggested that Old Fort York be moved to Coronation Park. This was opposed by a coalition of veterans' groups and historical societies. In 1971, the idea of expanding Exhibition Place, turning the park into a new location for the midway amusements and rides, was floated. Veterans' and labour organizations successfully stopped the proposal.

== Victory-Peace Monument ==
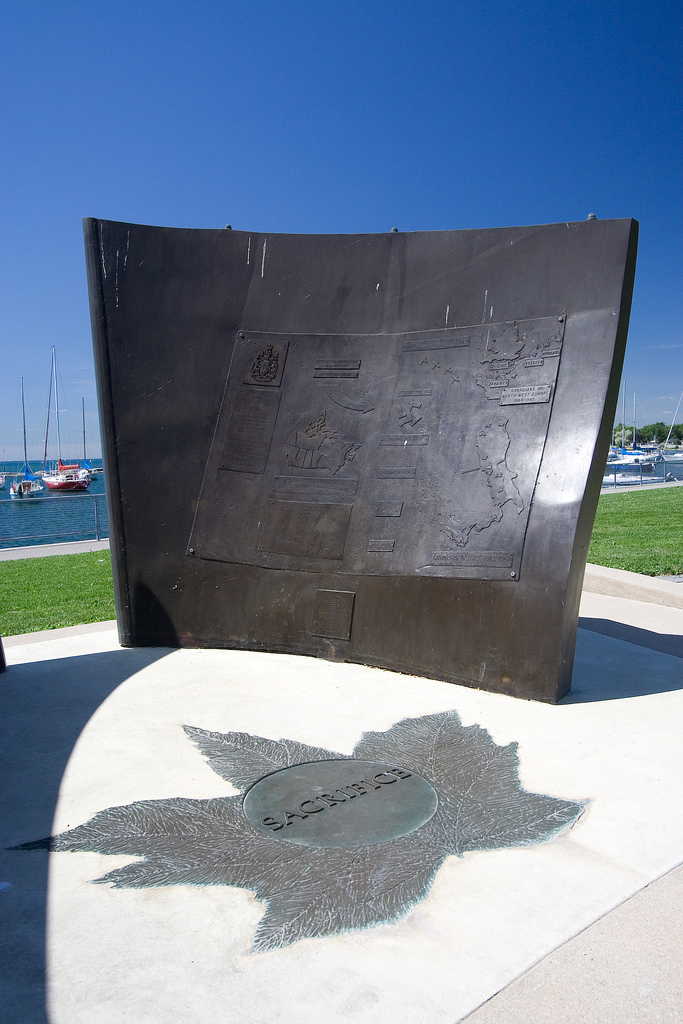
Part of the Victory-Peace Monument

A permanent memorial was designed by John McEwan and erected by the Second World War 50th Anniversary Memorial Tribute Committee in 1995, the 50th anniversary of the end of the Second World War. Named the Victory-Peace Monument, it stands at the water's edge, in a small clearing south of the grove of trees. The monument is formed like an amphitheatre, with a ring of concrete steps around a brick-paved circle, at the centre of which is a black-tinted concrete pad. At its middle is a brass disk, 5.6 metres (18 ft) in diameter, inscribed with the words 1939 1945 PEACE and the word peace in other languages. Six of the surrounding steps have black granite blocks approximately 60 centimetres (24 in) by 67 centimetres (26 in), each being etched with words or artwork relevant to the war. On a platform at the south are also a set of bronze walls, formed like a ship's prow and bearing artwork depicting Canada's involvement in the Second World War. Between these is a maple leaf cast into the concrete and engraved with the word Sacrifice. Just to the east is a tall flagpole with a victory garden planted around its base.

The piece was dedicated by Governor General Roméo LeBlanc on November 14, 1995. It was then rededicated by Dowdeswell, Mayor of Toronto John Tory, and members of the Canadian Armed Forces on November 10, 2018, the 100th anniversary of the end of the First World War.

The memorial was restored beginning in 2018, using funds from a government of Canada program to refurbish cenotaphs and memorials across the country, the City of Toronto, and private sources. The first phase restored the area of the King's Oak and the Empire Circle. Phase two took place in 2019 and restored the maple grove and pathways, along with the addition of signage.

== Park ==
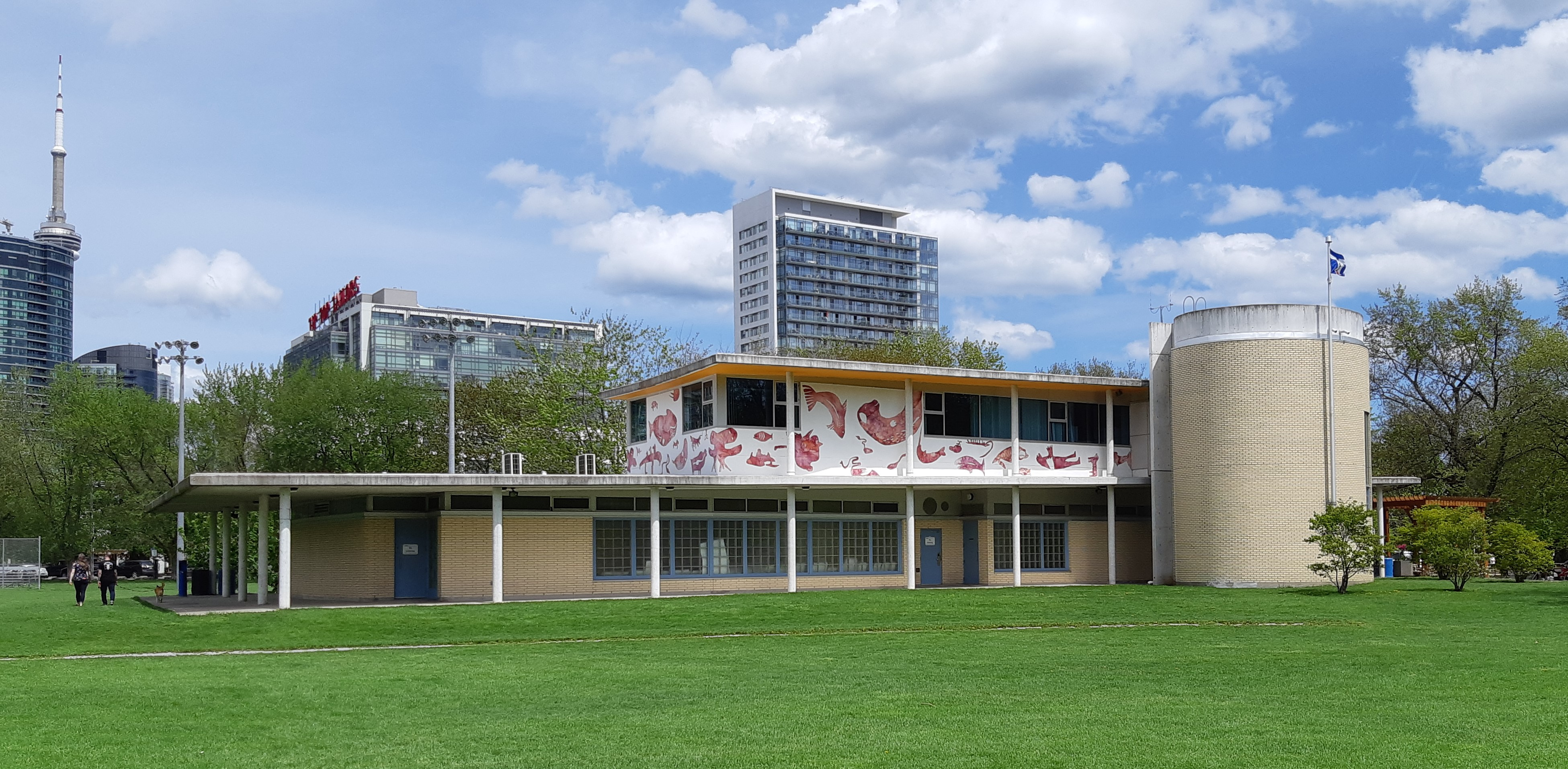
Coronation Park Pavilion from the west

The park has three baseball diamonds, which are used during non-winter months for informal softball and baseball leagues. During the Canadian National Exhibition, the diamonds are used for the Lions Club Pee-Wee Tournament for youth players. During the winter, an outdoor ice rink is built and used informally for ice hockey. Coronation Park also has an off-leash area for dogs and a clubhouse. Between two of the diamonds is Coronation Park Pavilion, built in 1995, which has washrooms, lockers, and showers for the users of the diamonds.

Remembrance Drive extends through the park, along the northern boundary of the tree groves. The Martin Goodman Trail extends through the park, along the water's edge.

== See also ==
- Royal eponyms in Canada
- Royal monuments in Canada
