= Lorne P-12 College =

Coordinates: 38.5392°S 143.9730°E

Information
- School type: Public
- Established: 1879
- Principal: Shane Elevato
- Years offered: P–12
- Gender: Co-educational
- Enrolment: 180

Lorne P–12 College is a government school in Victoria, Australia. It is located in Lorne and conducts pre-primary, primary and secondary classes. The Lorne campus and Aireys Inlet campus deamalgamated at the beginning of 2017 and renamed the Lorne campus to Lorne P–12 College.

== Notable alumni ==
- Luka Lesosky-Hay, AFLW footballer for the Richmond Football Club
- Ned Reeves, AFL footballer for the Hawthorn Football Club
- Jack Steven, AFL footballer for the Geelong Football Club, and formerly the St Kilda Football Club
