= Royal monuments in Australia =

Across Australia, various monuments have been established to pay tribute to royal figures, including members of the British royal family and the contemporary Australian monarchy. These landmarks underscore the nation's identity as a constitutional monarchy within the framework of the Australian Crown.

== Australian Capital Territory ==
(Australian Capital Territory)
Monument	Image	Location	Individual honoured
Statue (see King George V Memorial)		King George Terrace, Old Parliament House, Parkes	King George V
Statue		King's Hall, Old Parliament House, Parkes	King George V
Statue		Queen's Terrace, Parliament House, Canberra	Queen Elizabeth II

== New South Wales ==
(New South Wales)
Monument	Image	Location	Individual honoured
Statue		Queen Victoria Building, corner George, York and Druitt Streets, Sydney	Queen Victoria
Clock ("60 Years of Queen Victoria's Reign")		Leichhardt Town Hall, Leichhardt	Queen Victoria
Fountain ("60th Year of Reign of Queen Victoria")		Ted Mack Civic Park, North Sydney	Queen Victoria
Statue		Sydney	King Edward VII
Rotunda		Glen Innes	King Edward VII
Gate, park		King George V Park, Glen Innes	King George V
Tree plantation (see King George V Avenue of Memorial English Oaks)		East Tamworth	King George V
Gate, park		King George V Memorial Park, Willow Tree	King George V
Plaque		Deepwater School of Arts, Deepwater	King George V
Statue, hospital		King George V Memorial Hospital, Camperdown	King George V
Park		Hillston	King George V
Gate		Jubilee Park, Gerringong	King George V
Tablet/Plaque		St John's Anglican Church, Young	King George V
Gate		Blackheath Memorial Park, Blackheath	King George V
Park		King George V Memorial Park, Forbes	King George V
Garden (Sandringham Garden)		Hyde Park, Sydney	King George V, King George VI
Lamp		Bangalow	King George V, King George VI, Edward VII
Statue		Sydney	Prince Albert
Tree		St Simon & St Jude Anglican Church, Bowral	Queen Elizabeth II
Public Square (Queen Elizabeth II Place)		Queen Elizabeth II Place, adjacent to Registrar General's Building, Sydney	Queen Elizabeth II
Cape chestnut tree		Taree	Queen Elizabeth II
Bust		Corowa	Queen Victoria
Statue, square		Queens Square, Sydney	Queen Victoria
Clock		Deniliquin Town Hall, Deniliquin	Queen Victoria
Tablet/Plaque		St John's Anglican Church, Young	Queen Victoria
Pavilion		Victoria & Albert Pavilions, Royal Prince Alfred Hospital, Royal Prince Alfred Hospital, Camperdown	Queen Victoria, Prince Albert
Bas relief		Erskineville Town Hall, Erskineville	Duke of Wellington, Duchess of Wellington

== Queensland ==
(Queensland)
Monument	Image	Location	Individual honoured
Park (King Edward Park)		Brisbane	King Edward VII
Scout Hall (King George V Memorial Scout Hall) (alternatively "Queens Park Scout Hall")		Queens Park, Ipswich	King George V
Statue		King George Square, Brisbane	King George V
Gate (King George V Memorial Gate)		Anzac Memorial Park, Innisfail	King George V
Obelisk		Mirani	King George V
Plaque (part of Tiaro War Memorial)		Tiaro	King George V
Gate (King George V Memorial Gates)		Rockhampton Botanic Gardens, Rockhampton	King George V
Plaque		Tewantin RSL, Tewantin	King George V
(Lych) Gate		St Pauls Anglican Church, Ashgrove	King George V
Tree		Rockhampton Town Hall, Rockhampton	Queen Elizabeth II
Tree		Gracemere	Queen Elizabeth II
Tree		Mount Morgan	Queen Elizabeth II
Statue		Government House, Paddington	Queen Elizabeth II
Tree		Ingham Botanic Gardens, Ingham	Queen Elizabeth II
Tree		Bouldercombe	Queen Elizabeth II
Plaque, tree		Muttaburra	Queen Elizabeth II
Statue		Queens Gardens, Brisbane	Queen Victoria
Garden (Silver Jubilee of Queen Elizabeth II)		Warwick	Queen Elizabeth II

== South Australia ==
(South Australia)
Monument	Image	Location	Individual honoured
Statue		Adelaide	King Edward VII
Rotunda		Burra	King Edward VII
Statue		North Adelaide	King George V
Tree Plantation		Mount Bryan	King George VI
Fountain		Old Noarlunga	Diana, Princess of Wales
Playground (Princess Elizabeth Playground)		Adelaide	Queen Elizabeth II (then Princess)
Statue		Adelaide	Adelaide of Saxe-Meiningen (Queen Adelaide)
Statue (and Room)		Adelaide Town Hall, Adelaide	Adelaide of Saxe-Meiningen (Queen Adelaide)
Statue		Government House, Adelaide	Queen Elizabeth II
Statue		Victoria Square, Adelaide	Queen Victoria

== Tasmania ==
(Tasmania)
Monument	Image	Location	Individual honoured
Stained glass window (The Ascension (Coronation of King George V))		St John's Church, Launceston	King George V
Statue		Franklin Square, Hobart	King Edward VII
Statue		Royal Park, Launceston	King Edward VII
Stained glass window		St John's Church, Launceston	King Edward VII
Tree plantation (King George V Memorial Avenue)		St Helens Church of England Cemetery, St Helens	King George V
Tree (Marriage of Prince and Princess of Wales)		Franklin Square, Hobart	Prince Albert Edward, Prince of Wales (King Edward VII), Princess Alexandra of Denmark (Queen Alexandra)
Plaque and rose garden		Claremont, Tasmania	Diana, Princess of Wales
Cherry tree		Franklin House, Launceston	Queen Elizabeth II
Tree		Frankford	Queen Elizabeth II
Clock, chimes (Queen Victoria Clock Tower)		General Post Office, Hobart	Queen Victoria

== Victoria ==
(Victoria (state))
Monument	Image	Location	Individual honoured
Foundation stone, bust		Castlemaine Hospital Castlemaine	Queen Victoria
Plaque		Ballarat Town Hall, Ballarat	Duke of Clarence
Clock, chimes		Old Geelong Post Office, Geelong	King Edward VII
Statue		Customs Park, Geelong	King Edward VII
Tree, obelisk		Hamilton Botanic Gardens, Hamilton	King Edward VII
Statue		Queen Victoria Gardens, Melbourne	King Edward VII
Rotunda		Murtoa	King Edward VII, Queen Victoria
Building (Sailors' Rest)		Geelong	King Edward VII
Rotunda		Ballarat Botanical Gardens, Ballarat	King Edward VII
Fountain		Ararat Town Hall, Ararat	King George V
Statue		Sturt Street, Ballarat	King George V
Plaque		Balmoral War Memorial, Balmoral	King George V
Statue		Pall Mall, Bendigo	King George V
Statue		Johnstone Park, Geelong	King George V
Bust		Hamilton Botanic Gardens, Hamilton	King George V
Clock tower		Heidelberg Town Hall, Ivanhoe	King George V
Statue		Kings Domain, Melbourne	King George V
Gardens		King George V Gardens, Wangaratta	King George V
Gate		Warrnambool Botanic Gardens, Warrnambool	King George V
Baths		Red Cliffs	King George V
Fountain		Sebastopol Library, Sebastopol	King George V
Rotunda		Merbein	King George V
Fountain		Mildura	King George V
Gate		Deakin Reserve, Shepparton	King George VI
Tree plantation (The Royal Oaks)		Taradale	Edward VII (then Prince of Wales), Alexandra of Denmark (then Princess of Wales)
Tree plantation		Castlemaine Botanic Gardens, Castlemaine	Edward VII (then Prince of Wales), Alexandra of Denmark (then Princess of Wales)
Stained glass window		Holy Trinity Church, Kew	Prince Albert
Tree plantation		Maldon Shire Gardens, Maldon	Edward VII (then Prince of Wales), Alexandra of Denmark (then Princess of Wales)
Tree plantation		Evatt Park, Lakes Entrance	Prince William
Tree		Panmure	Diana, Princess of Wales
Garden		Flemington Racecourse, Flemington	Diana, Princess of Wales
Plane tree		Avenel	Queen Elizabeth II (then Princess Elizabeth)
Tree		Ballarat Botanical Gardens, Ballarat	Queen Elizabeth II (then Princess Elizabeth)
Statue		Alexandra	Queen Alexandra (then Princess of Wales)
Fountain		Sturt Street Gardens, Ballarat	Queen Victoria
Statue		Rosalind Park, Bendigo	Queen Victoria
Fountain		Wills Square, Daylesford	Queen Victoria
Obelisk		Dunolly	Queen Victoria
Statue		Geelong Botanic Gardens, Geelong	Queen Victoria
Statue		Queen Victoria Gardens, Melbourne	Queen Victoria
Rotunda		Beaufort	Queen Victoria
Plaque		Ballarat Town Hall, Ballarat	Queen Victoria
Tree		Tea Tree Lake, Mortlake	Queen Victoria
Church		Bonnie Doon	Queen Victoria
Stained glass window		St John's Anglican Church, Nagambie	Queen Victoria
Tree		Ballarat Botanical Gardens, Ballarat	King Charles III (then Prince Charles), Diana, Princess of Wales
Plaque		Old Barwon Bridge, Winchelsea	Prince Alfred
Stained glass window		St George the Martyr Anglican Church, Queenscliff	Queen Victoria

== Western Australia ==
(Western Australia)
Monument	Image	Location	Individual honoured
Stained glass window		St John's Anglican Church, Albany	King Edward VII
Statue		Kings Park, Perth	Queen Victoria
Bell tower and bells		St George's Cathedral, Perth	Queen Victoria

== See also ==
- Royal eponyms in Australia
- Royal monuments in Canada
- Monarchy of Australia
- List of Australian organisations with royal patronage
- Royal tours of Australia
- List of Commonwealth visits made by Elizabeth II
- List of prime ministers of Elizabeth II
- List of sovereign states headed by Elizabeth II
- Australian peers and baronets
- Wattle Queen
