= Pier to Pub =

Annual Australian swimming race

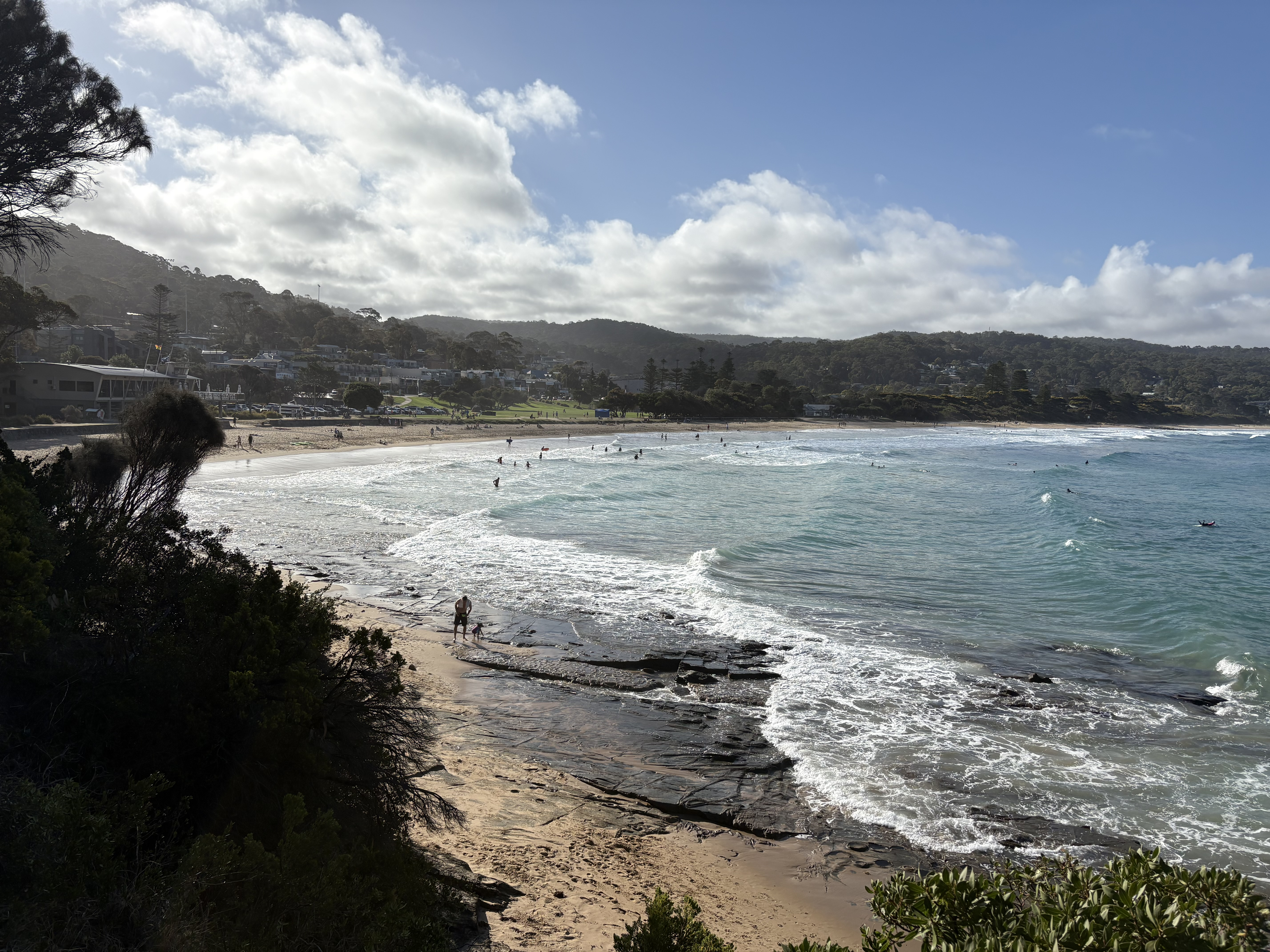
- Lorne Beach, from the south, in the direction of the event
- Date: January, annually
- Location: Lorne
- Event type: Open water swimming
- Distance: 1.2 kilometres (0.75 mi)
- Established: 1981; 45 years ago
- Course records: Men: 10:02 (2016) by Sam Sheppard; Women: 10:51 (2016) by Harriet Brown
- Website: lornesurfclub.com.au/pier-to-pub-events/pier-to-pub/pier-to-pub-home/
- Participants: up to 5200

The Lorne Pier to Pub is an annual, 1.2 km (0.75 mi) open water swimming race held in January at Lorne, a town located on the Great Ocean Road in Victoria, Australia.

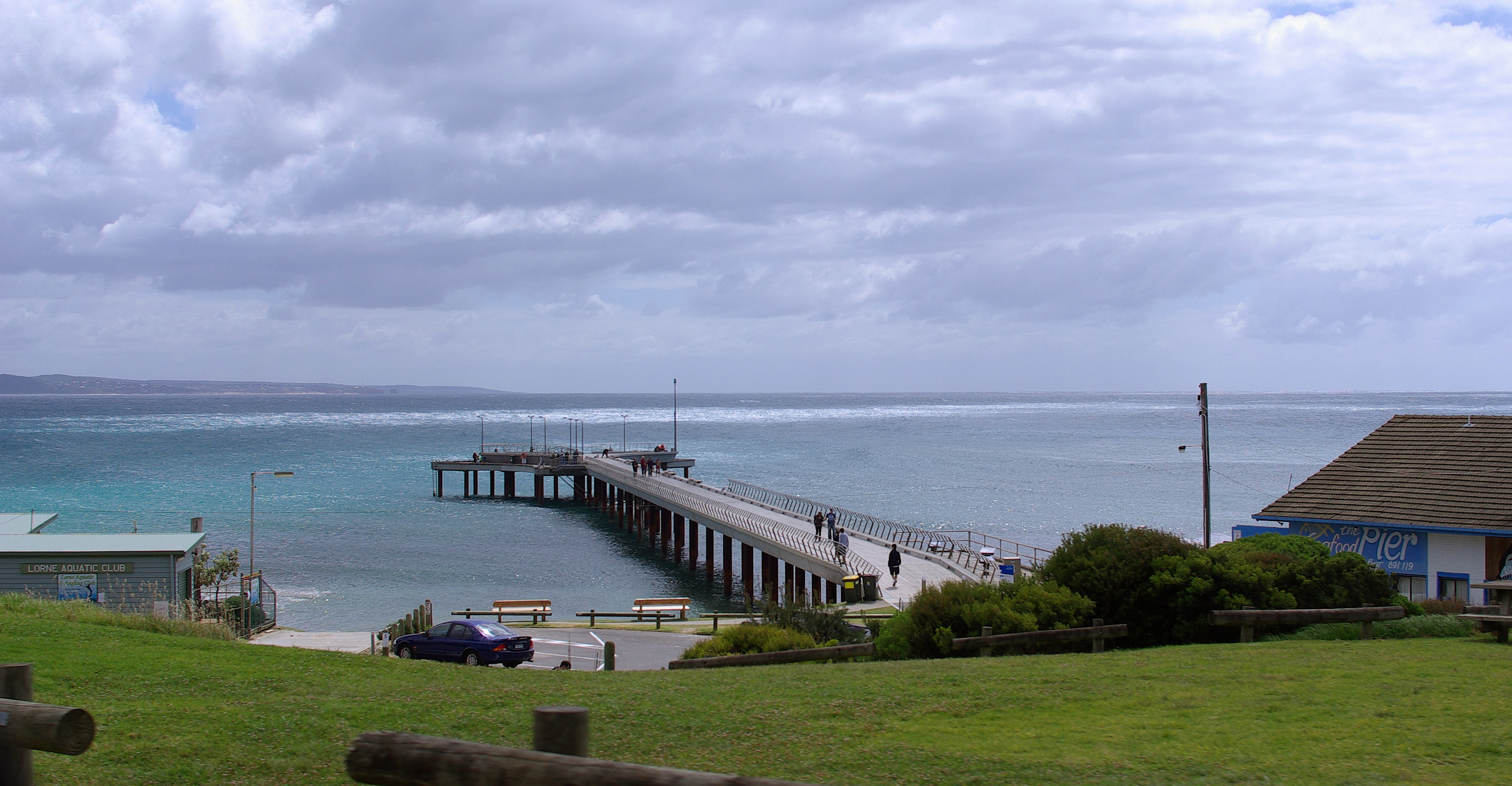
The pier at Lorne

== History ==
It began in 1981, when a member of the Lorne Surf Lifesaving Club, Paul Lacey, had the idea to have a "fun" swim from the Lorne Pier through Louttit Bay and finish by bodysurfing the waves onto the Lorne Beach. The first swim was done by Lacey and lifeguard Clyde Whitehand to test the course, and the swimmers were greeted on the beach by an announcement by "Sharkey" and applause from beachgoers, a small number compared to the thousands that greet the swimmers today. The first race took place a few weeks later following a surf carnival at Lorne. Competitors from the carnival and a number of Lorne locals dived and jumped off the pier and followed a course of buoys into the beach.

The race today consists of the same process. Swimmers' times are recorded at the finish line and published in the Herald Sun newspaper the next morning. The race is completed, on average, in 22 minutes, but the quickest race time is 10 minutes, 30 seconds.

The race attracts up to 4,000 competitors, and in 1998 it entered the Guinness Book of Records with 3071 swimmers, making it the world's largest open water swim. The race is organised by the Lorne Surf Life Saving Club, sponsored by major partner Powercor. Proceeds from the race go to the Lorne Surf Life Saving Club.

In January 2020, the Pier to Pub swim celebrated its 40th anniversary. The swim was conducted in a virtual format in 2021 and 2022 due to the COVID-19 pandemic. For 2023, the event was held in a hybrid format: an in-person format race and a virtual format race.

== Mountain to Surf ==
The Mountain to Surf is an 8 km (5.0 mi) fun run starting in Lorne and continuing through the forest and then along the Great Ocean Road and finishing at the Lorne Surf Life Saving Club. It is held the day before the Pier to Pub.

== Notable previous winners ==
- Olympic bronze medalist Rob Woodhouse won in 1986, 1989 and 1993.
- Two-time Olympic gold medalist, world champion and former world record-holder in the 1,500-m freestyle Kieren Perkins won in 1992.
- Four-time Olympic medalist Daniel Kowalski won in 1996 and 2007.
- British Olympian Ellen Gandy won the women's event in 2012.
- Four-time World Short Course champion and world record-holder in the 4×200-metre freestyle relay Lani Pallister won in 2018, 2019,2020, 2023, 2024, 2025,and 2026.
