= Lorne, Victoria =

Lorne
- Town
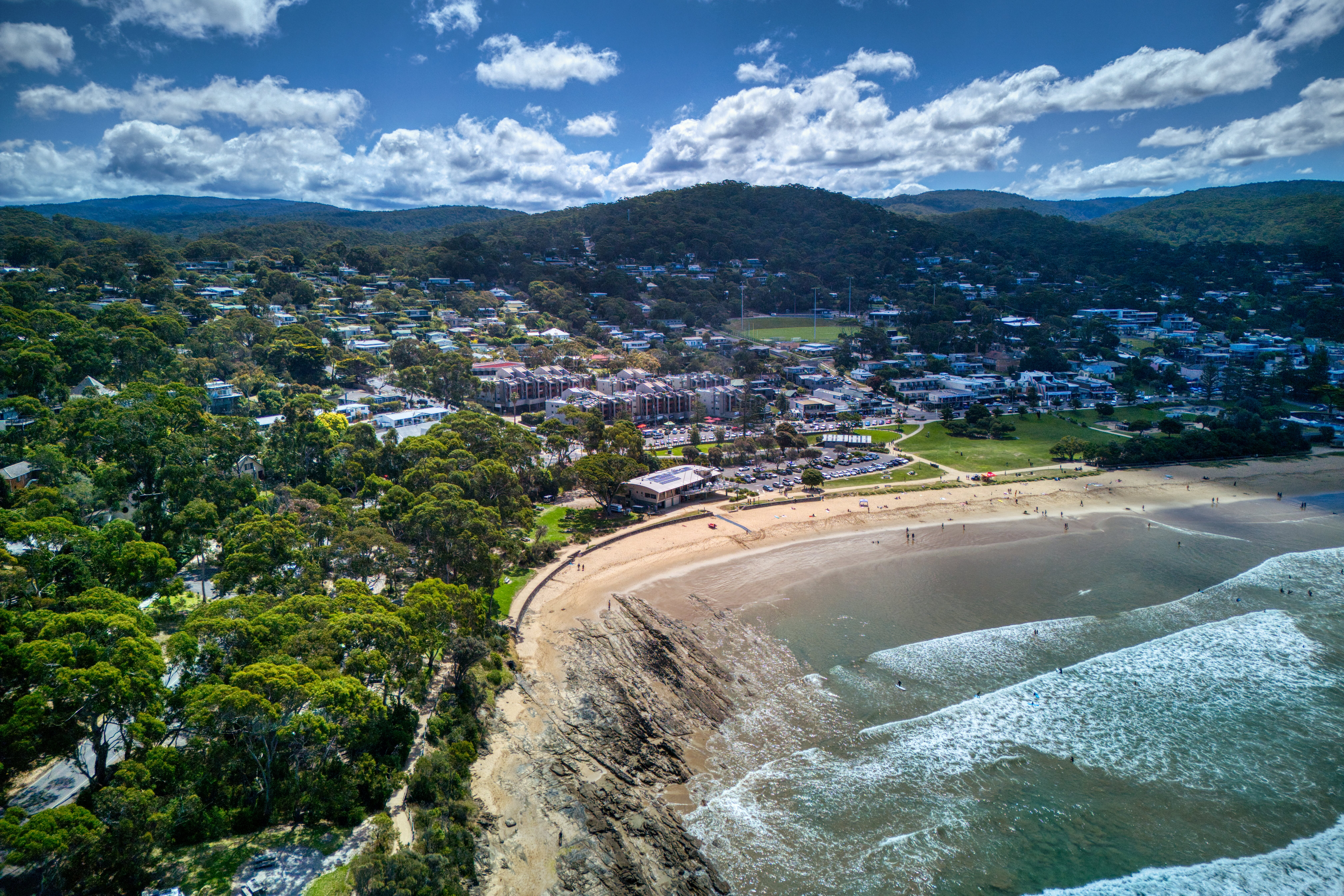
- Lorne Beach

- Coordinates: 38°32′S 143°58′E
- Country: Australia
- State: Victoria
- LGA: Surf Coast Shire
- Location: 138.3 km (85.9 mi) sw of Melbourne; 65 km (40 mi) sw of Geelong; 57 km (35 mi) s of Colac
- Established: 1869

Government
  - State electorate: Polwarth
  - Federal division: Wannon
- Elevation: 15 m (49 ft)

Population
  - Total: 1,327 (2021 census)
- Postcode: 3232
Localities around Lorne
Benwerrin	Benwerrin	Big Hill
Barwon Downs	Lorne	Bass Strait
Barwon Downs	Separation Creek	Bass Strait

Lorne is a town in Surf Coast Shire, Victoria, Australia. It is situated on the Louttit Bay and Erskine River and is a popular destination on the Great Ocean Road. At the 2021 census, Lorne had a population of 1,327.

== History ==
Prior to British settlement, Lorne was part of the traditional lands of the Gadubanud or King Parrot people of the Cape Otway coast.

Lorne is situated on a bay named after Captain Louttit, who sought shelter there in 1841 while supervising the retrieval of cargo from a nearby shipwreck. The coast was surveyed five years later in 1846. The first European settler was William Lindsay, a timber-cutter who began felling the area in 1849. Two of his children died in 1850 when they were buried by collapsing sand. A memorial to them is situated near the swing bridge over the Erskine River.

John Herd held a cattle-grazing licence encompassing the coastal lands from Lorne to Aireys Inlet, from 1853. In the 1860s, the Mountjoy brothers (Thomas, Caleb and Lawrence) established the Temperance Hotel, which later became Erskine House.

The first telegraph arrived in 1859. Subdivision began in 1869 and in 1871 the town was named after the Marquess of Lorne from Argyleshire in Scotland on the occasion of his marriage to Princess Louise, one of Queen Victoria's daughters. The Post Office opened on 29 April 1874.

In 1891, the area was visited by Rudyard Kipling, who was inspired to write the poem The Flowers, which includes the lines:

Buy my hot-wood clematis,
Buy a frond of fern,
Gathered where the Erskine leaps
Down the road to Lorne.

By 1922, the Great Ocean Road was extended to Lorne. The first passenger road service to Geelong was established in 1924 and guesthouses began to appear after 1930.

Lorne Magistrates' Court closed on 1 October 1984.

== Tourism ==
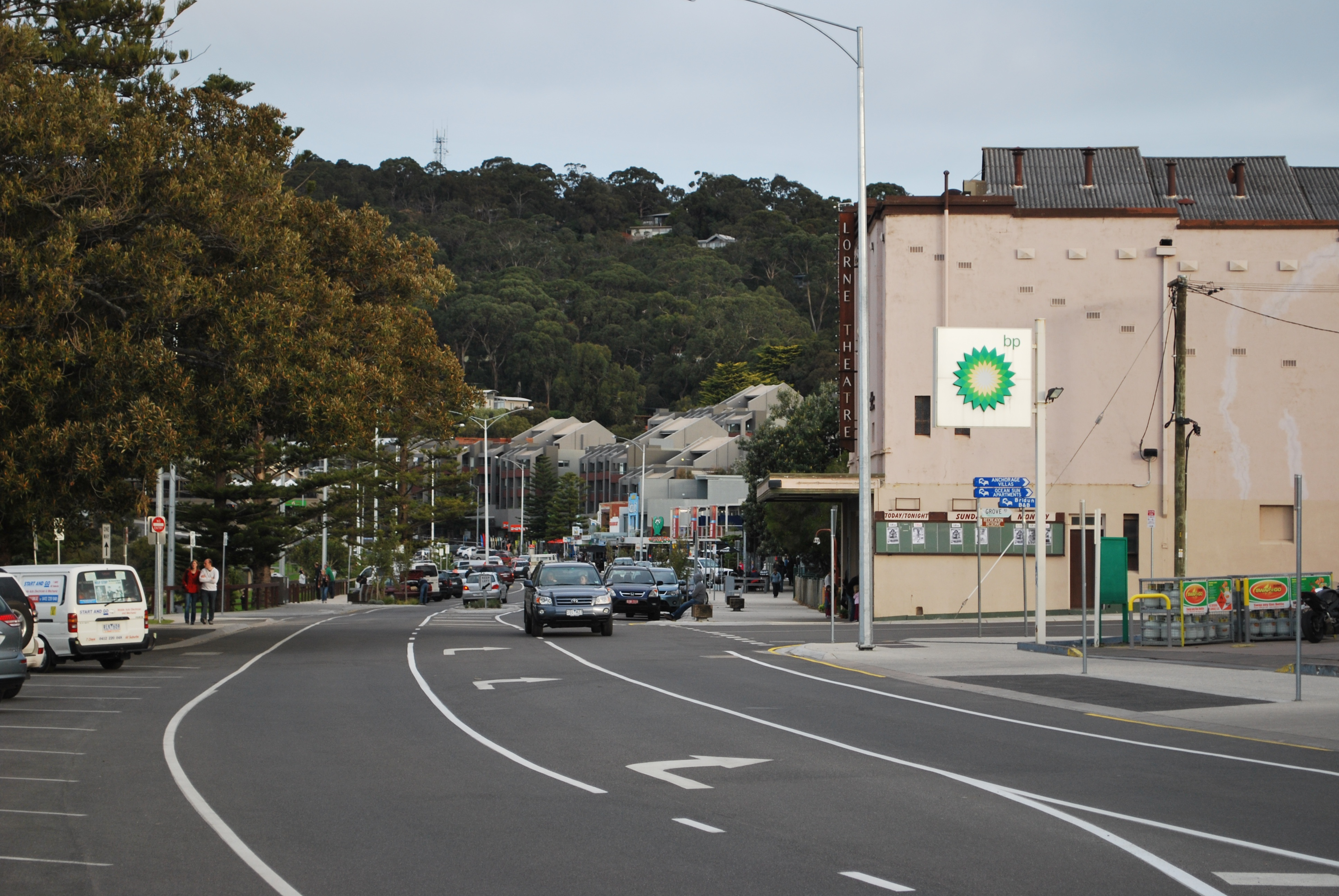
Mountjoy Parade, part of the Great Ocean Road and the main street of Lorne. The Lorne Theatre can be seen on the right hand side of the street.

Popular local activities include traditional beach pursuits such as family bathing and surfing at the main beach, as well as pier fishing for barracuda, whiting, and trevally. Teddy's Lookout lies at the end of George Street on the town's southern outskirts and offers fine views over the town, coastline, and Great Ocean Road. The Great Otway National Park is nearby; the Erskine River, which rises in the park and contains the Erskine Falls, has its mouth at Lorne.

During the first weekend of January, over 20,000 spectators visit Lorne when the town hosts the 1.2 km (0.75 mi) Pier to Pub swim,, the 8 km (5.0 mi) Mountain to Surf run, and the Lorne Surf Boat Race. Lorne was once the endpoint for the Great Otway Classic Foot Race that used to be held on the Queen's Birthday. Fair on the Foreshore occurs on the first weekend in November.

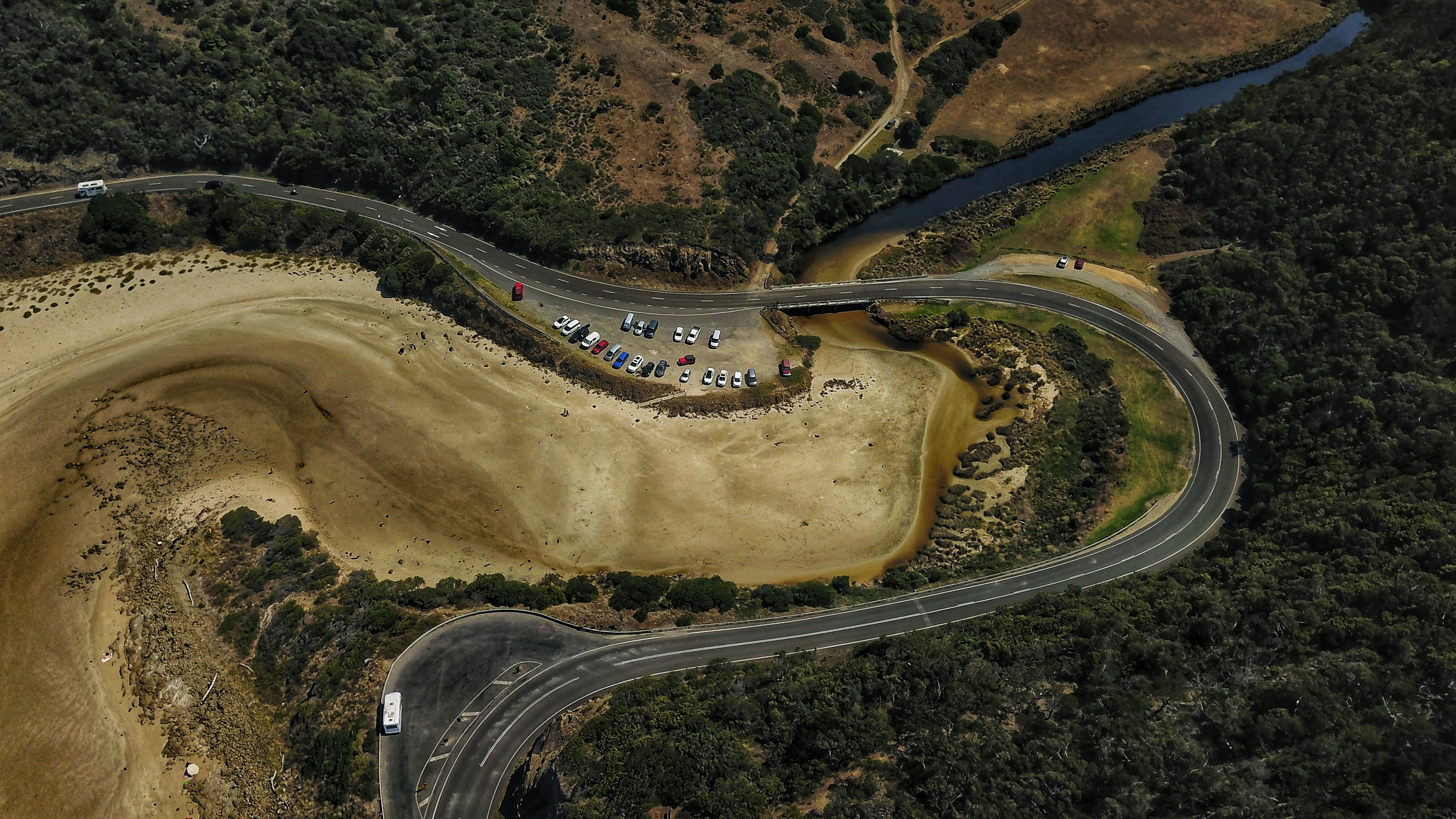
St Georges River, just outside Lorne along the Great Ocean Road. March 2019.

The town has two pubs (The Grand Pacific Hotel and Lorne Hotel) and a number of cafes, restaurants, and bakeries, mostly located along Mountjoy Parade. As usual in a tourist town, there is a large number of boutiques and clothing stores, as well as a book store, art galleries, and craft shops. Lorne has the Great Ocean Road Museum, which describes the history of the road. Things to do in Lorne include strolling along the Great Ocean Road, visiting the Lorne Pier, surfing or exploring the Otway Ranges National Park. There are also many art galleries and cultural events to enjoy.

== Sport ==
The town is home to the Lorne Football Netball Club, which competes in both Australian Rules football and netball in the Colac & District Football Netball League.

Golf and tennis are played at the Lorne Country Club on Holliday Road.

== Education ==
Lorne has one school, Lorne P-12 College, that facilitates both primary and secondary education.

== Media ==
Lorne has a local magazine, Lorne Independent, published monthly. The local newspaper sold in Lorne is the Geelong Advertiser, published daily except Sundays.

Five free-to-air television networks, Seven, WIN, Network 10, ABC TV and SBS, all broadcast a service to Lorne. Unlike Anglesea/Aireys Inlet, the Ballarat channels are being broadcast into Lorne instead of the Melbourne channels via a translator in the coastal city, although the Melbourne channels can be received in Lorne with a high-gain mast antenna system aiming at Mount Dandenong.

Lorne receives radio stations from Melbourne and Geelong. Previously, Mixx FM was broadcasting into Lorne via a translator on 92.7 FM, but this was turned off in August 2021 due to low listenership and the clear reception of Melbourne and Geelong FM stations. A translator for OCR FM on 88.7 FM is available for local radio in Lorne.

== Climate ==
Lorne has an oceanic climate (Cfb) with mild summers and cool, damp winters.

Climate data for Lorne Pier Head
Month	Jan	Feb	Mar	Apr	May	Jun	Jul	Aug	Sep	Oct	Nov	Dec	Year
Record high °C (°F)	42.5 (108.5)	42.6 (108.7)	39.6 (103.3)	33.4 (92.1)	25.7 (78.3)	19.7 (67.5)	21.6 (70.9)	26.0 (78.8)	29.0 (84.2)	33.8 (92.8)	36.3 (97.3)	42.2 (108.0)	42.6 (108.7)
Mean daily maximum °C (°F)	23.2 (73.8)	24.0 (75.2)	22.3 (72.1)	19.9 (67.8)	17.2 (63.0)	14.6 (58.3)	14.1 (57.4)	15.0 (59.0)	16.5 (61.7)	18.3 (64.9)	19.9 (67.8)	21.8 (71.2)	18.9 (66.0)
Mean daily minimum °C (°F)	14.1 (57.4)	14.8 (58.6)	14.0 (57.2)	12.1 (53.8)	10.4 (50.7)	8.6 (47.5)	7.5 (45.5)	7.9 (46.2)	8.7 (47.7)	9.8 (49.6)	11.2 (52.2)	12.6 (54.7)	11.0 (51.8)
Record low °C (°F)	7.2 (45.0)	8.1 (46.6)	7.3 (45.1)	5.2 (41.4)	3.4 (38.1)	3.0 (37.4)	2.2 (36.0)	3.0 (37.4)	3.8 (38.8)	4.2 (39.6)	4.7 (40.5)	6.1 (43.0)	2.2 (36.0)
Average precipitation mm (inches)	41.9 (1.65)	33.1 (1.30)	61.6 (2.43)	69.7 (2.74)	72.4 (2.85)	77.4 (3.05)	87.3 (3.44)	96.9 (3.81)	92.2 (3.63)	80.7 (3.18)	69.9 (2.75)	49.6 (1.95)	839.4 (33.05)
Average precipitation days	9.7	7.1	11.7	13.4	16.2	17.7	19.5	20.8	17.8	16.1	14.0	11.9	175.9
Average relative humidity (%)	64	63	68	68	73	74	73	69	70	68	67	65	69

== Heritage listed sites ==
Lorne contains a number of heritage listed sites, including:

- 35 Mountjoy Parade, Erskine House, Lorne
- Great Ocean Road
- 242-244 Mountjoy Parade, Jura, Lorne
- 222 Mountjoy Parade, Leighwood
- 76-80 Mountjoy Parade, Lorne Cinema
- 18 Smith Street and 15 Grove Road, Lorne Primary School

== Annual events ==
- Pier to Pub
- Falls Festival (New Years)
- Great Ocean Road Marathon
- Lorne Festival of Performing Arts
- Lorne Film
- Lorne Sculpture Biennale
- Schoolies Week
- Swing Bridge Model Boat Regatta
- Caulfield Cup Punting Bonanza
- Cox Plate Punting Bonanza

== Notable people ==
- Rod Sims (born 1950), former chair of the Australian Competition & Consumer Commission (ACCC)
- Jack Steven (born 1990), former AFL footballer at the St Kilda and Geelong football clubs.

== Gallery ==
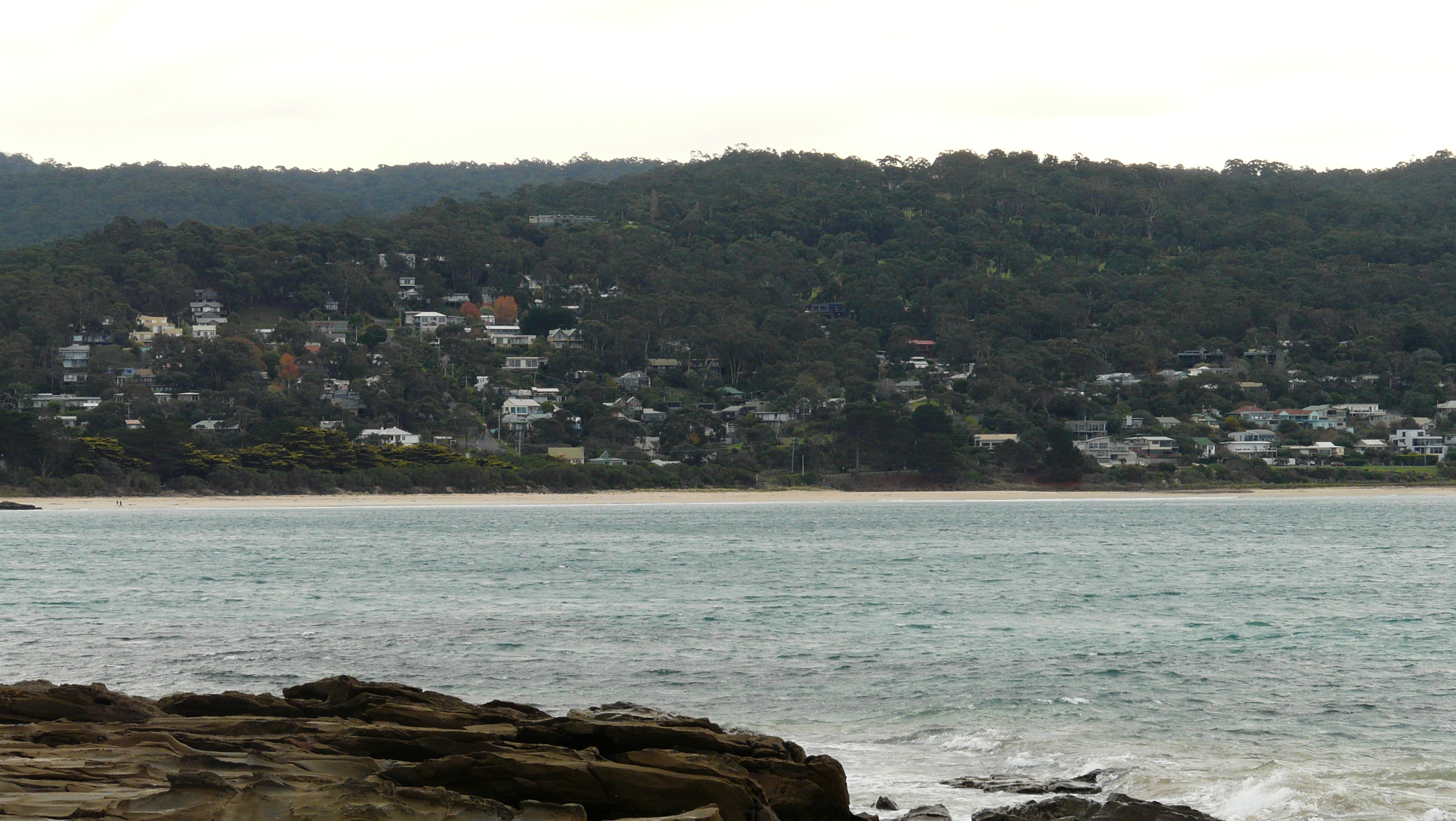
Another view of Lorne

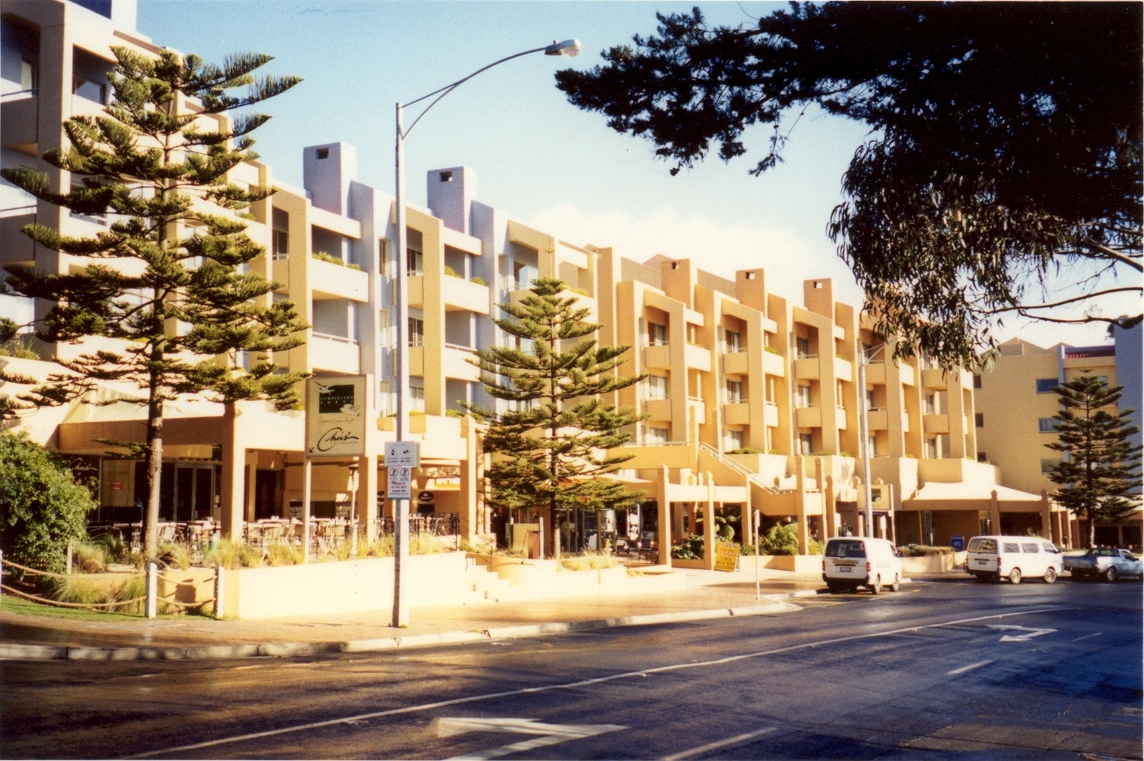
The Cumberland Lorne Resort on Mountjoy Parade

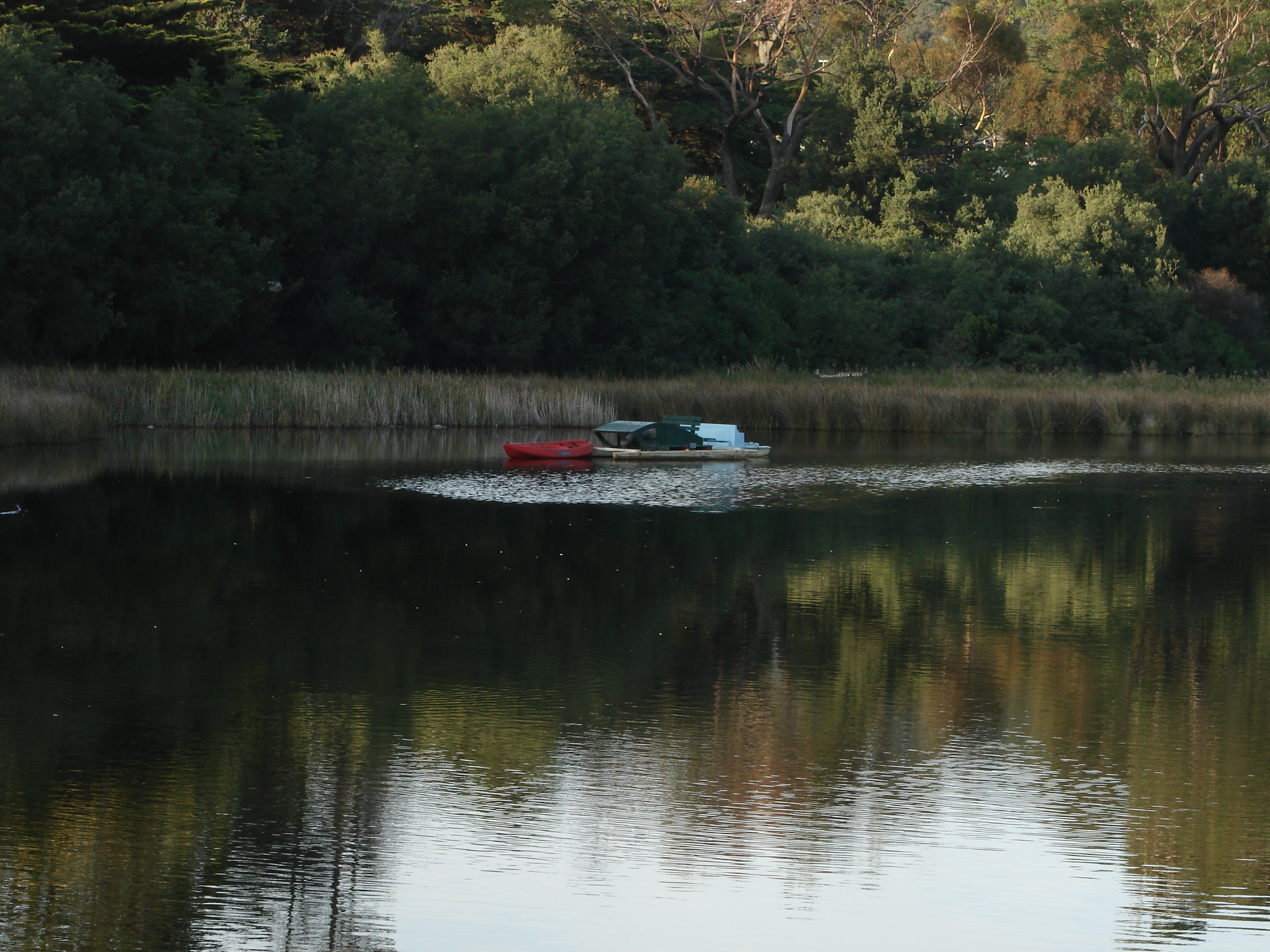
Erskine River in Lorne

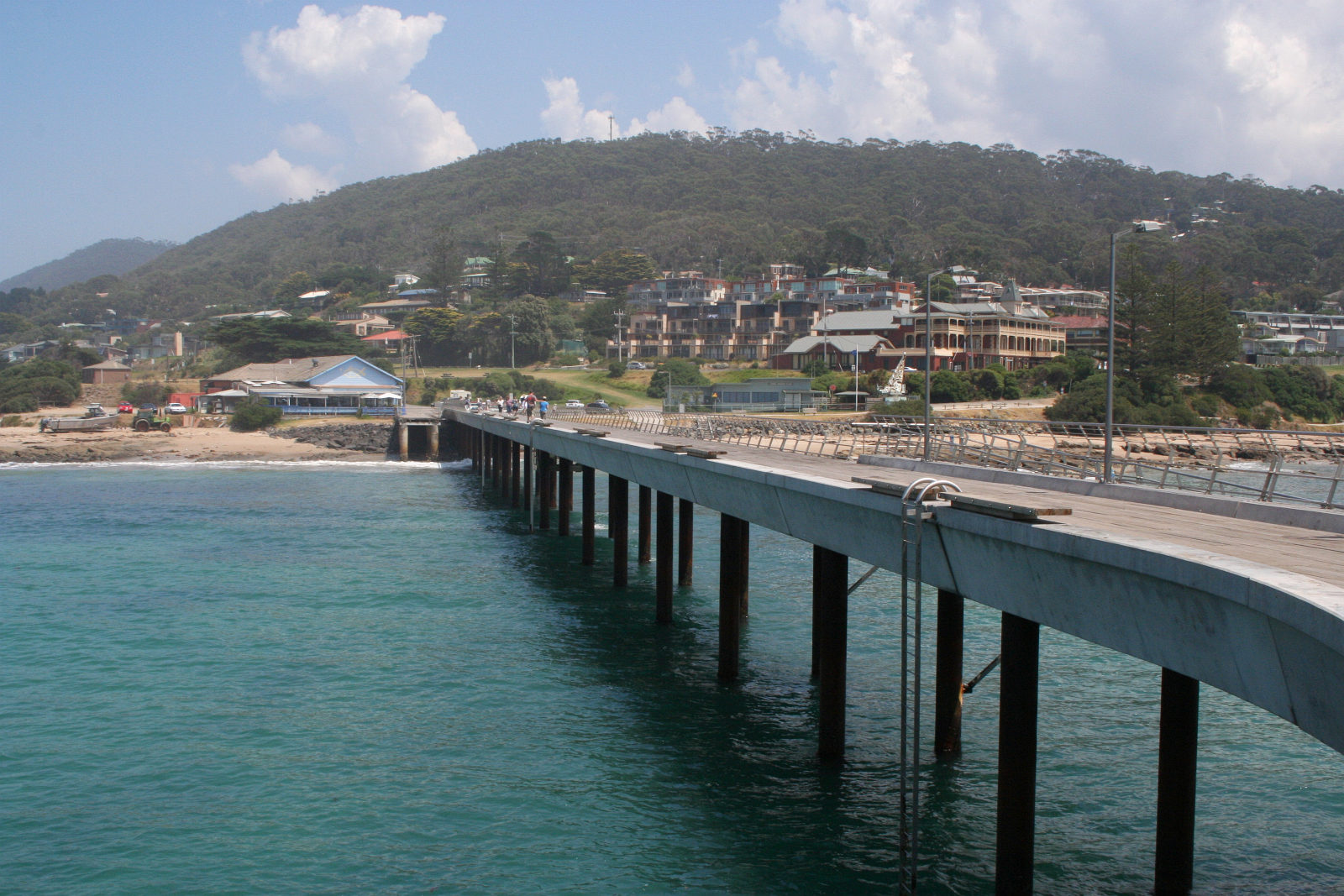
Main pier at Lorne, opened in 2007 to replace the previous one

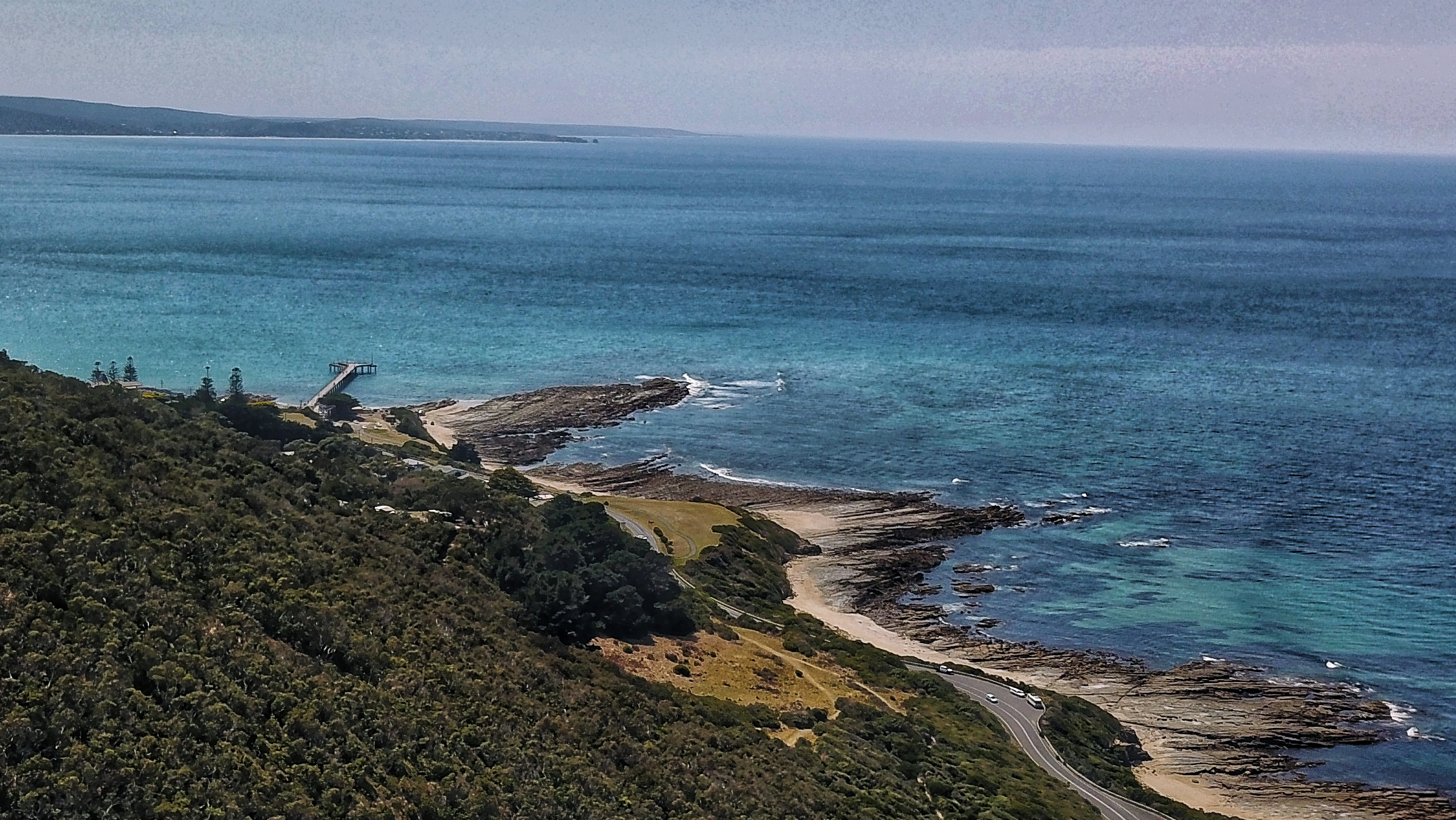
Lorne Pier from Teddys Lookout

== See also ==
- Royal eponyms in Australia
