= Lorne Beach =

Beach in Lorne, Victoria, Australia

- Beach
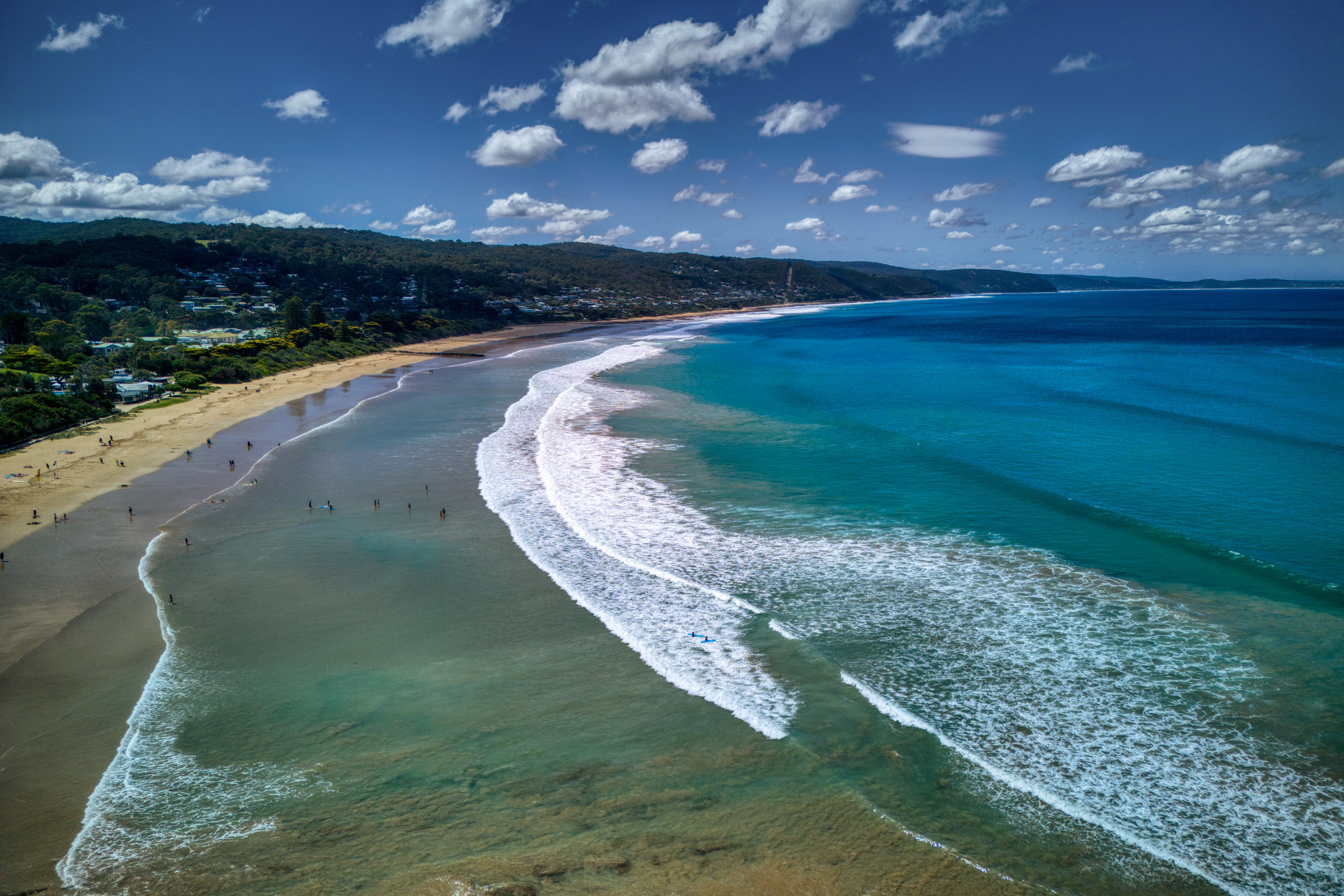
- Lorne Beach, 2024
- Interactive map of Lorne Beach
- Coordinates: 38°32′24″S 143°58′37″E
- Location: Lorne, Victoria, Australia
- Water bodies: Louttit Bay (Bass Strait)

Dimensions
  - Length: 1.2 kilometres (0.75 mi)
- Patrolled by: SLSA
- Hazard rating: 5/10 (moderately hazardous)
- Access: Mountjoy Parade (Great Ocean Road), Cypress Avenue

Lorne Beach is a beach located at the town of Lorne on the coast of Louttit Bay, Victoria, Australia. Running alongside the Great Ocean Road, it is one of the state's most popular seaside destinations and serves as the town's main swimming beach. Sheltered by Point Grey at its southern end, the beach is known for its relatively calm conditions compared with much of the surrounding coastline and is patrolled during the summer months by the Lorne Surf Life Saving Club. It is also bordered by a large foreshore reserve containing picnic areas, recreational facilities and public amenities.

== History ==
The foreshore at Lorne has played a central role in the town's history since the earliest years of European settlement. Boats were landed on the beach, fish were caught using nets, and the foreshore became the site of Lorne's original sea baths. It also served as a landing area for some of the first aeroplanes to visit the township. Over time, the adjoining foreshore became a focal point for community recreation, with facilities for cricket, football, tennis, bowls, and trampolines established on an area locally known as "The Flat".

In 1958, the Victorian Public Works Department extended the existing seawall northwards towards Grove Road in an effort to protect the shoreline. Soon after its completion, severe seas undermined the wall, destroying much of the structure and causing extensive erosion. Around 3 metres of beach sand and sand dunes were washed away, while nearby buildings, including Bert Driscoll's dodgem car pavilion, were left undermined by the loss of sand.

Concerned about erosion threatening nearby properties, including Erskine House, owner Hector Stribling sought assistance from the Ports and Harbours authority. Quarryman Bill Roach subsequently constructed a sandstone groyne at the southern end of the beach to encourage sand accumulation. The project proved successful, and additional timber groynes were later installed across the main beach to further reduce erosion by trapping sand. Although the timber groynes eventually became buried beneath the beach, they were removed in 2005 to create a safe running course for the World Surf Lifesaving Championships.

== Description ==
Lorne Beach extends for approximately 1.2 kilometres from the mouth of the Erskine River southwards to Point Grey and the Lorne Pier. The southern headland provides significant protection from ocean swells, with waves typically averaging around 1 metre. As a result, the beach is generally regarded as one of the safer ocean beaches in Victoria, although rip currents can develop during periods of larger surf, particularly outside the patrolled areas.

The beach is popular for swimming, beginner surfing and fishing. During moderate to large swells, surfers also make use of breaks around Lorne Point, while the rock platforms near Point Grey are frequented by windsurfers and waveski riders. Fishing is most common near the mouth of the Erskine River, from the adjacent rock platforms and from the rock groyne at high tide.

The foreshore reserve includes picnic and barbeque areas, playgrounds, public toilets, change rooms, showers, bicycle paths, a skate park, swimming pool, grassed recreation areas and accessible facilities.

== See also ==
- Thirteenth Beach
- Torquay Surf Beach
- Torquay Front Beach
- Jan Juc Beach
- Great Ocean Road
