= St George River (Victoria) =

Perennial river in Victoria, Australia

St George
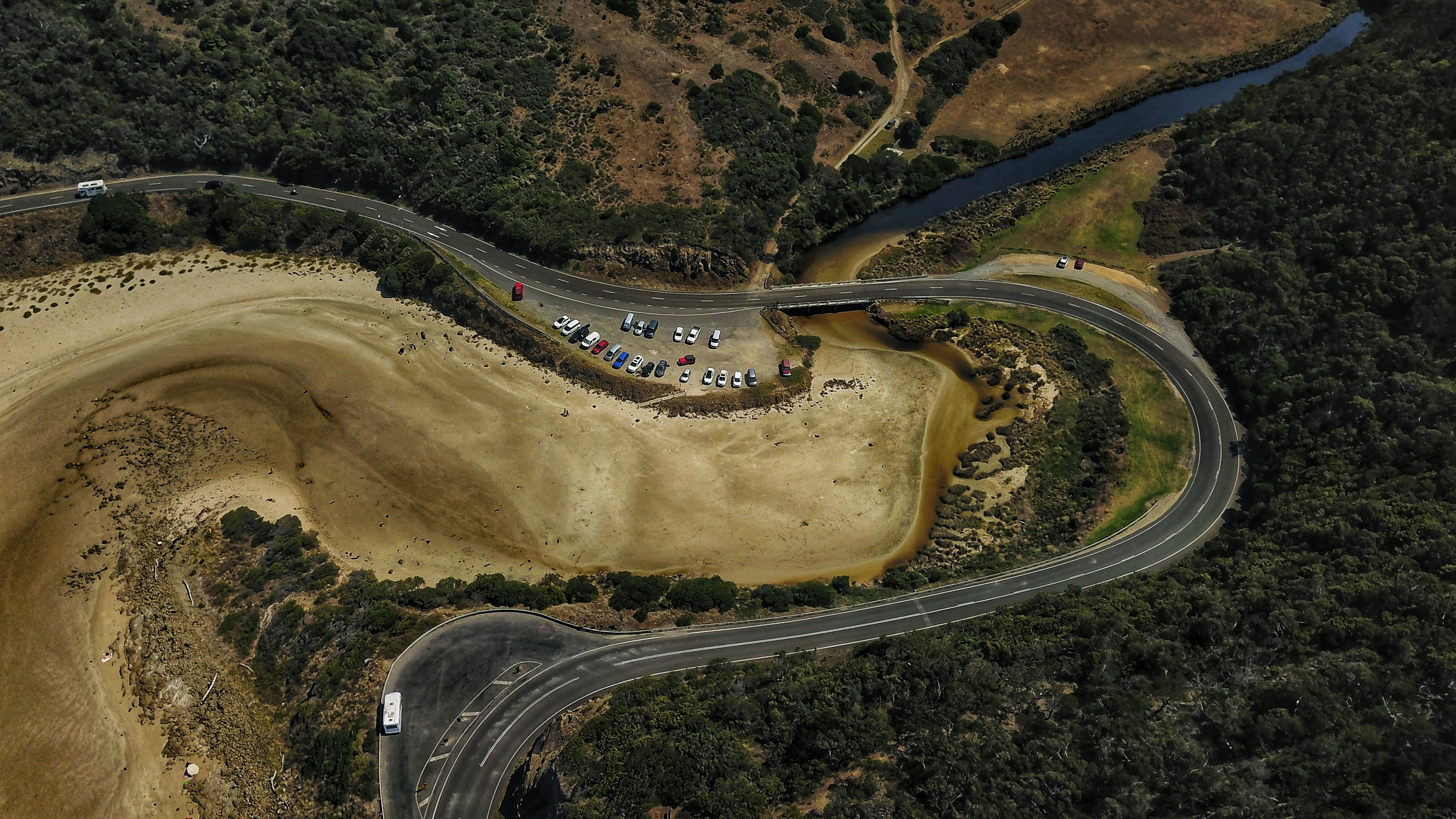
- St Georges River, just outside Lorne along the Great Ocean Road, March 2019

- Location of the St George River mouth in Victoria

Location
- Country: Australia
- State: Victoria
- Region: South East Coastal Plain (IBRA), The Otways
- Local government area: Colac Otway Shire

Physical characteristics
- Source: Otway Ranges
  - location: below Mount Cowley
  - coordinates: 38°32′27″S 143°51′8″E
  - elevation: 585 m (1,919 ft)
- Mouth: Bass Strait
  - location: near Lorne
  - coordinates: 38°33′24″S 143°58′43″E
  - elevation: 0 m (0 ft)
- Length: 14 km (8.7 mi)

Basin features
- River system: Corangamite catchment
- Tributaries
  - left: Small Creek, Cora Lynn Creek
  - right: Henderson Creek
- National park: Port Campbell National Park

The St George River, sometimes incorrectly referred to as the Saint George River, is a perennial river of the Corangamite catchment, in the Otways region of the Australian state of Victoria.

== Location and features ==
The St George River rises in the Otway Ranges in southwest Victoria, below Mount Cowley, and flows generally east through the Port Campbell National Park, joined by three minor tributaries, before reaching its river mouth and emptying into Bass Strait, northeast of Cape Otway and south of the town of Lorne. From its highest point, the river descends 585 metres (1,919 ft) over its 14-kilometre (8.7 mi) course.

== See also ==
- List of rivers of Australia § Victoria
