= Victoria Bridge, Townsville =

Historic swing bridge in Queensland, Australia

- The Bridge at Dawn with the Sugarshaker (Townsville's Highest Building) in the background.
- Coordinates: 19.2604°S 146.8184°E
- Carries: Pedestrians
- Crosses: Ross Creek, South Townsville
- Locale: Townsville, Queensland
- Heritage status: Queensland Heritage Register (ID 600928)

Characteristics
- Design: Swing bridge
- Material: Steel

History
- Constructed by: G. H. Royce & Co.
- Construction start: 1888
- Opened: 2 July 1889
- Closed: 1975

Location
- Interactive map of Victoria Bridge, Townsville

Victoria Bridge, Townsville
- Location within Queensland
- 19.2604°S 146.8184°E
- Location: Stokes Street, Townsville, City of Townsville, Queensland, Australia

History
- Design period: 1870s–1890s (late 19th century)
- Built: 1888–1980s

Queensland Heritage Register
- Official name: Victoria Bridge
- Type: state heritage (built)
- Designated: 21 October 1992
- Reference no.: 600928
- Significant period: 1880s (fabric); 1889–1975 (historical use)
- Significant components: machinery/plant/equipment – transport – road, pier/s (bridge)
- Builders: G H Royce & Co

Victoria Bridge is a heritage-listed swing bridge over the Ross Creek at Stokes Street, Townsville CBD, City of Townsville, Queensland, Australia. The central-pivoting swing bridge was constructed by G. H. Royce & Co. in 1888 to 1889. It is one of only two of its type constructed in Australia.

By 1924 the swing section had ceased to function, but the bridge continued to serve as a road bridge until 1975. Following a 1988 redevelopment, it was converted to pedestrian traffic, with a row of modern shops built along its length.

It was added to the Queensland Heritage Register on 21 October 1992.

== History ==
Apart from Victoria Bridge, built in 1888–1889, the only other metal girder swing bridge constructed in Australia was the smaller one over the Forth River at Leith in Tasmania, built in 1884. Tenders were called by the Department of Works, Bridges Branch, on 25 September 1885 for the Townsville structure. A tender submitted by G.H. Royce & Co. of Sydney was accepted at a cost of £18,868. The approaches were constructed by Robertson & Stein and cost £1,780.

It was opened to traffic on 2 July 1889 and saw active service until 1975. The innovative design of a swing bridge pivoting on a central drum was an unusual method of allowing river traffic to pass up shallow Ross Creek. The central swing allowed large ships to pass through in the deeper, left hand channel, while smaller craft could take the shallower right lane. During the years after the bridge was opened the commercial centre of Townsville expanded and the warehouse district was gradually confined closer to the mouth of Ross Creek. Ships were no longer required to move up the creek to unload. By 1924 the swing section had ceased to function because of movement of the central drum.

However, vehicular traffic continued to cross for another fifty years. The bridge had seriously deteriorated by the 1980s and was threatened with demolition, until 1988 when it was leased by the Townsville City Council to a developer. Conservation work was undertaken as part of the re-development. A new superstructure of shops was built onto and around the existing fabric and the approaches to the bridge and the banks were landscaped. The kiosks installed along the northern bank are now a favourite meeting place for the community.

== Description ==
Victoria Bridge was originally one of only two metal girder, swing bridges in Australia. It was an all steel structure except for wooden decking. A central drum, from which the central span swung open, housed the gas, free piston Otto engine. A row of modern shops has been built along its length, with a restaurant under the eastern end of the structure. An office is located beneath the western end.

Although the swing span no longer moves, the bridge is structurally sound. The gas engine was removed and in 1991 was mounted at the city end. The addition of a modern superstructure of shops and the removal of the approaches has substantially altered the visual aspect.

== Heritage listing ==
Victoria Bridge was listed on the Queensland Heritage Register on 21 October 1992 having satisfied the following criteria.

The place is important in demonstrating the evolution or pattern of Queensland's history.

The design of this central pivoting, swing bridge was an innovative solution to the problem of a bridge over a shallow waterway.

Only one other bridge of a similar design was constructed in Australia.

Victoria Bridge is also held in high regard because it has been a feature of the townscape and played a major part in the development of the city for over one hundred years.

The place demonstrates rare, uncommon or endangered aspects of Queensland's cultural heritage.

Only one other bridge of a similar design was constructed in Australia.

The place is important in demonstrating a high degree of creative or technical achievement at a particular period.

The design of this central pivoting, swing bridge was an innovative solution to the problem of a bridge over a shallow waterway.

The place has a strong or special association with a particular community or cultural group for social, cultural or spiritual reasons.

Victoria Bridge is also held in high regard because it has been a feature of the townscape and played a major part in the development of the city for over one hundred years.

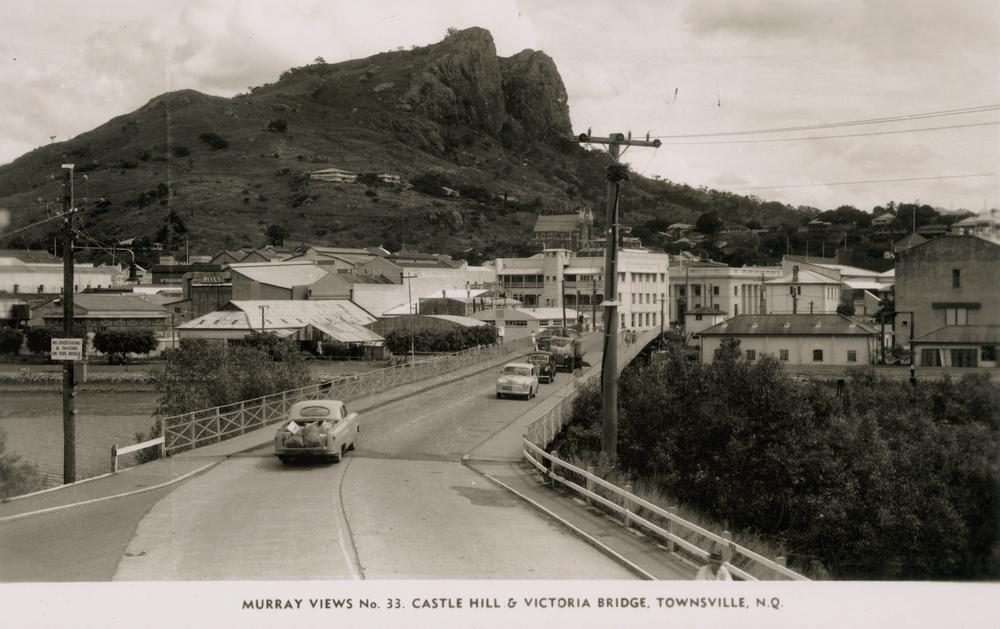
Looking across the Victoria Bridge to Townsville CBD with Castle Hill, Townsville in the background, circa 1955

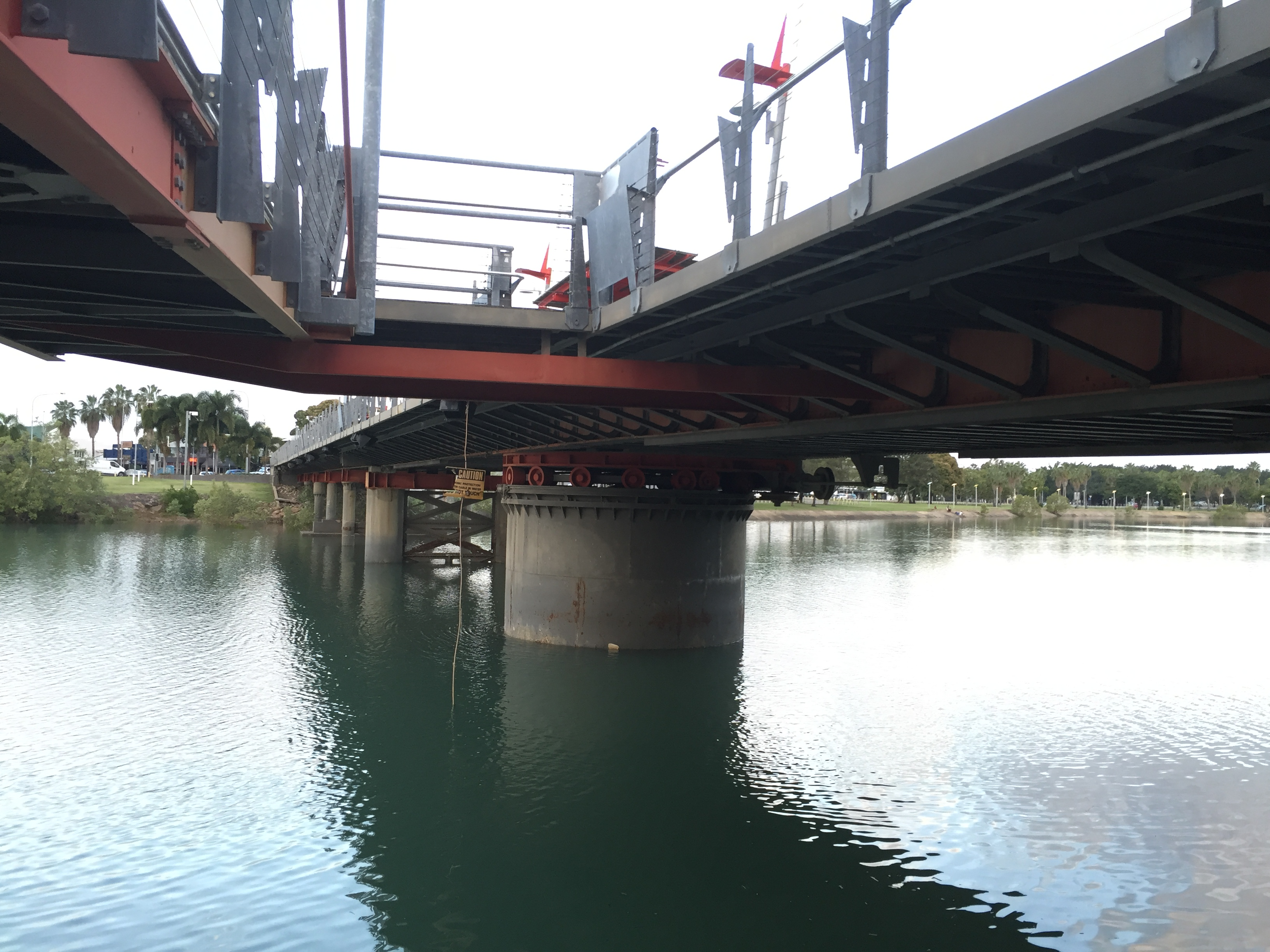
View of the underside of the bridge with the central drum that allowed the bridge to pivot, 2016

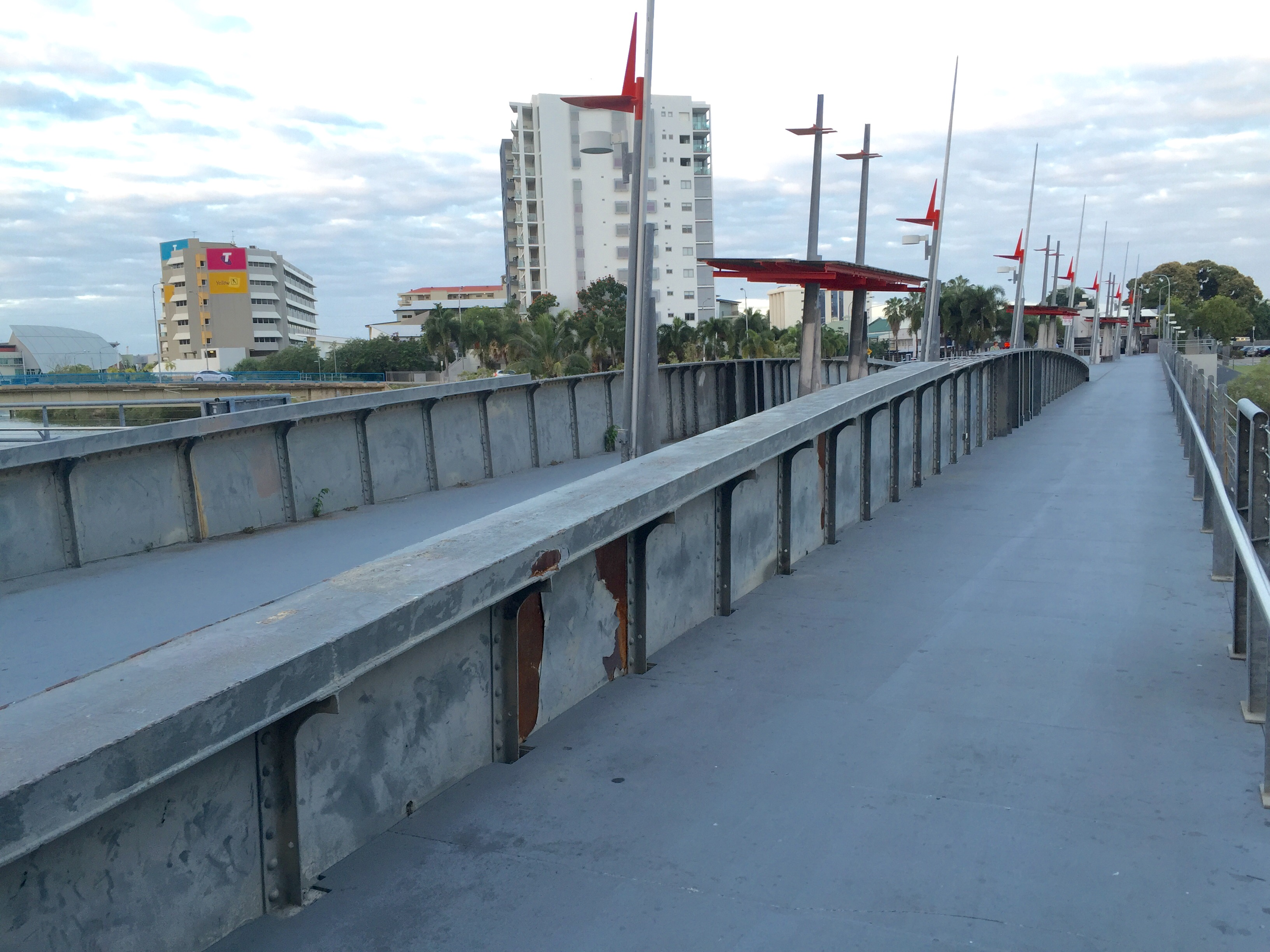
The swinging span of the bridge deck, 2016

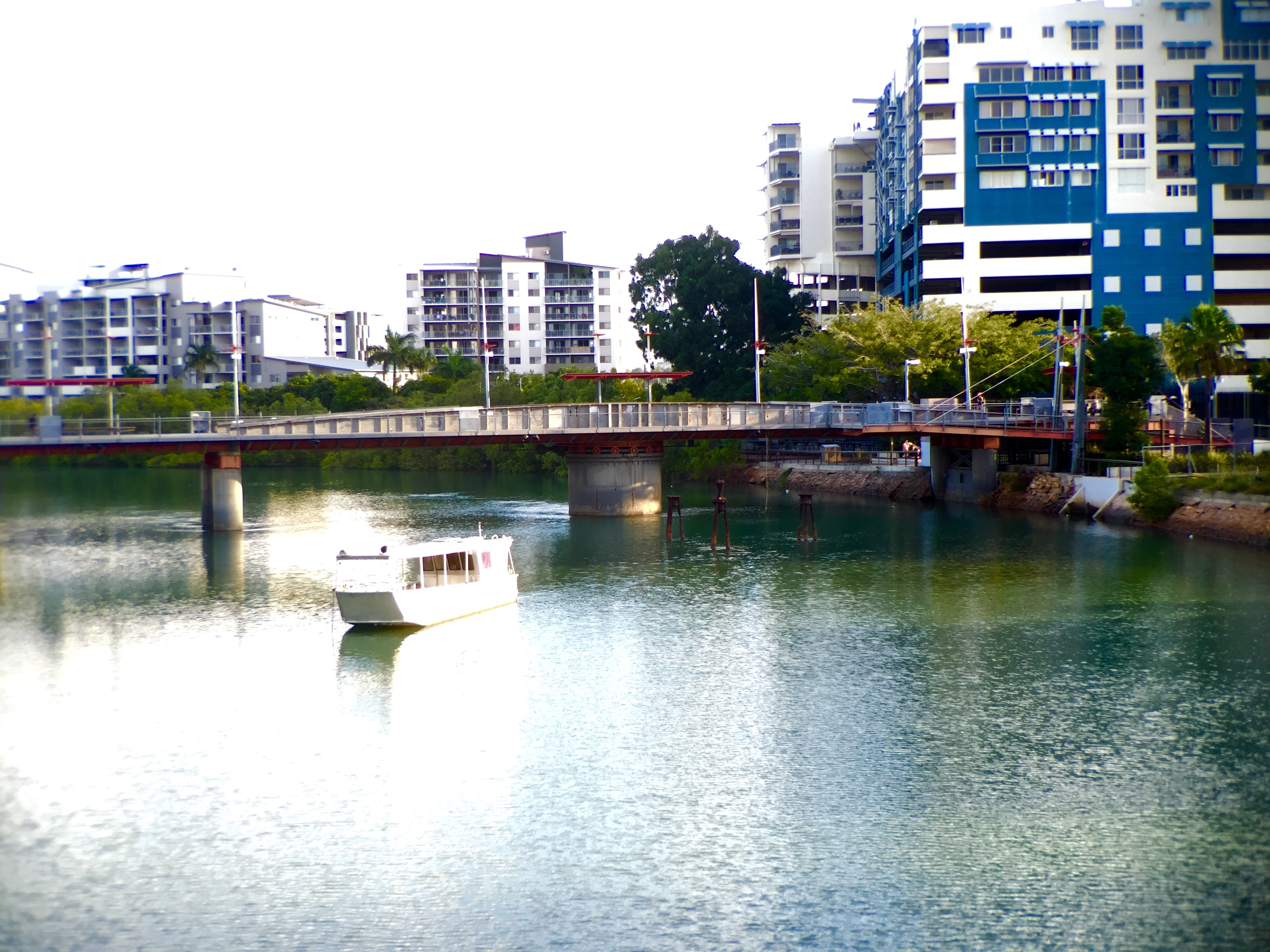
Boat approaching the swinging span, 2016

== Engineering heritage award ==
The bridge received a Historic Engineering Marker from Engineers Australia as part of its Engineering Heritage Recognition Program.
