= List of rivers of the Pacific Ranges =

This is a list of rivers originating in or transiting the Pacific Ranges, which are the southernmost of the three major subdivisions of the Coast Mountains in British Columbia, Canada.

- Alfred Creek
- Alouette River
- Ashlu Creek
- Atnarko River
- Bella Coola River
- Big Silver Creek
- Birkenhead River
- Brandywine Creek
- Bridge River
- Capilano River
- Cayoosh Creek
- Cheakamus River
- Cheekye River
- Chehalis River
- Clendinning Creek
- Clowhom River
- Deserted River
- Elaho River
- Fitzsimmons Creek
- Fraser River
- Gates River
- Green River
- Harrison River
- Haylmore Creek
- Homathko River
- Hurley River
- Indian River
- Kingcome River
- Klinaklini River
- Lillooet River
- Lord River
- Machmell River
- Mamquam River
- McGillivray Creek
- Meager Creek
- Nahatlatch River
- Norrish Creek
- Pitt River
- Powell River
- Rainy River
- Ring Creek
- River of Golden Dreams
- Rubble Creek
- Ruby Creek
- Ryan River
- Seton River
- Seymour River
- Skwawka River
- Soo River
- Southgate River
- Squamish River
- Stave River
- Stein River
- Tchaikazan River
- Toba River
- Tzoonie River
- Vancouver River
- Wannock River
- West Klinaklini River
- Yalakom River

== See also ==
- List of rivers of the Kitimat Ranges
- List of rivers of the Boundary Ranges
- List of rivers of the Canadian Rockies
- List of rivers of the Omineca Mountains
- List of rivers of the Rocky Mountains
