= Vancouver Bay, British Columbia =

Coordinates: 50°25′N 125°10′W

Vancouver Bay was a cannery town on the South Coast of British Columbia, Canada, located on the East side of Prince of Wales Reach of lower Jervis Inlet, at the bay of the same name, which is the mouth of the Vancouver River.

BC Forest Products had a large logging camp in the valley and it ran from the 1930s to the 1970s. Trains and later trucks were used.

== See also ==
- List of canneries in British Columbia
