= Vancouver River =

River in British Columbia, Canada

Coordinates: 49°55′N 123°52′W

Vancouver River is located in the Sunshine Coast region of the South Coast of British Columbia, Canada, emptying into Prince of Wales Reach of lower Jervis Inlet at the former cannery town of Vancouver Bay and the bay of the same name. The river is approximately 21 km in length.

== See also ==
- List of rivers of British Columbia
- List of rivers of the Pacific Ranges
