= Mount Churchill (British Columbia) =

Mountain in British Columbia, Canada

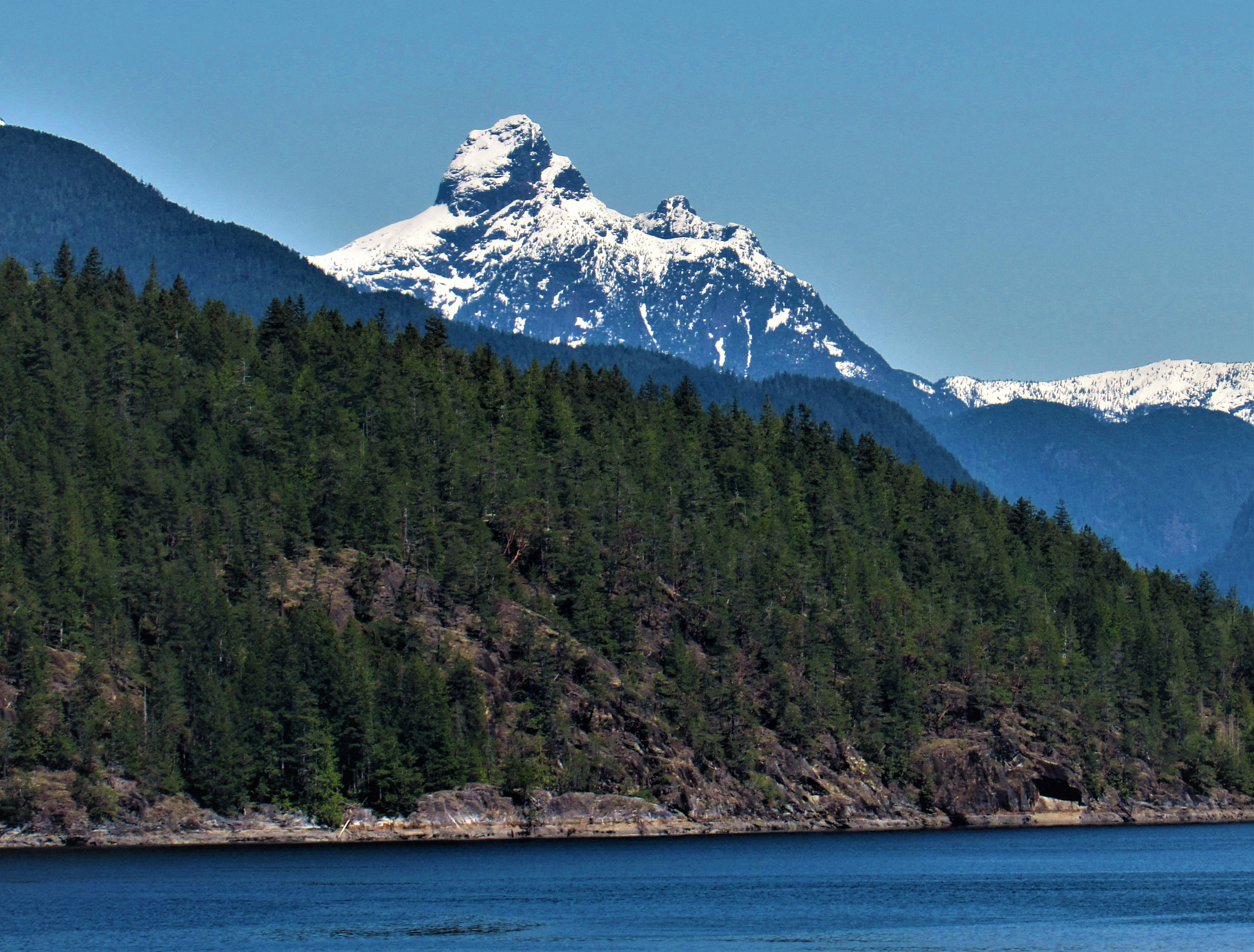
- South aspect

Highest point
- Elevation: 1,996 m (6,549 ft)
- Prominence: 834 m (2,736 ft)
- Isolation: 16.75 km (10.41 mi)
- Listing: Mountains of British Columbia
- Coordinates: 49°58′07″N 123°51′09″W

Naming
- Etymology: Francis Spencer, 1st Baron Churchill

Geography
- Location within British Columbia Location within Canada
- Interactive map of Mount Churchill
- Location: British Columbia, Canada
- District: New Westminster Land District
- Parent range: Coast Mountains
- Topo map: NTS 92G13 Jervis Inlet

Mount Churchill is a mountain summit located in British Columbia, Canada.

== Description ==
Mount Churchill is a 1,996-meter-elevation (6,549-foot) peak situated 100 kilometers (62 miles) northwest of Vancouver, in the Sunshine Coast region, and is part of the Coast Mountains. Precipitation runoff from Mount Churchill drains to Jervis Inlet via Glacial Creek and High Creek. Mount Churchill is more notable for its steep rise than for its absolute elevation. Topographic relief is significant as the summit rises 1,996 meters (6,549 feet) above tidewater of Jervis Inlet in five kilometers (3.1 miles).

== Etymology ==
The mountain was named in 1860 by Sir George Henry Richards, probably after Francis Spencer, 1st Baron Churchill (1779–1845), the youngest son of George Spencer, 4th Duke of Marlborough. The mountain's toponym was officially adopted March 31, 1924, by the Geographical Names Board of Canada.

== Climate ==
Based on the Köppen climate classification, Mount Churchill is located in the marine west coast climate zone of western North America. Most weather fronts originate in the Pacific Ocean, and travel east toward the Coast Mountains where they are forced upward by the range (Orographic lift), causing them to drop their moisture in the form of rain or snowfall. As a result, the Coast Mountains experience high precipitation, especially during the winter months in the form of snowfall. Temperatures in winter can drop below −20 °C with wind chill factors below −30 °C.

== Gallery ==
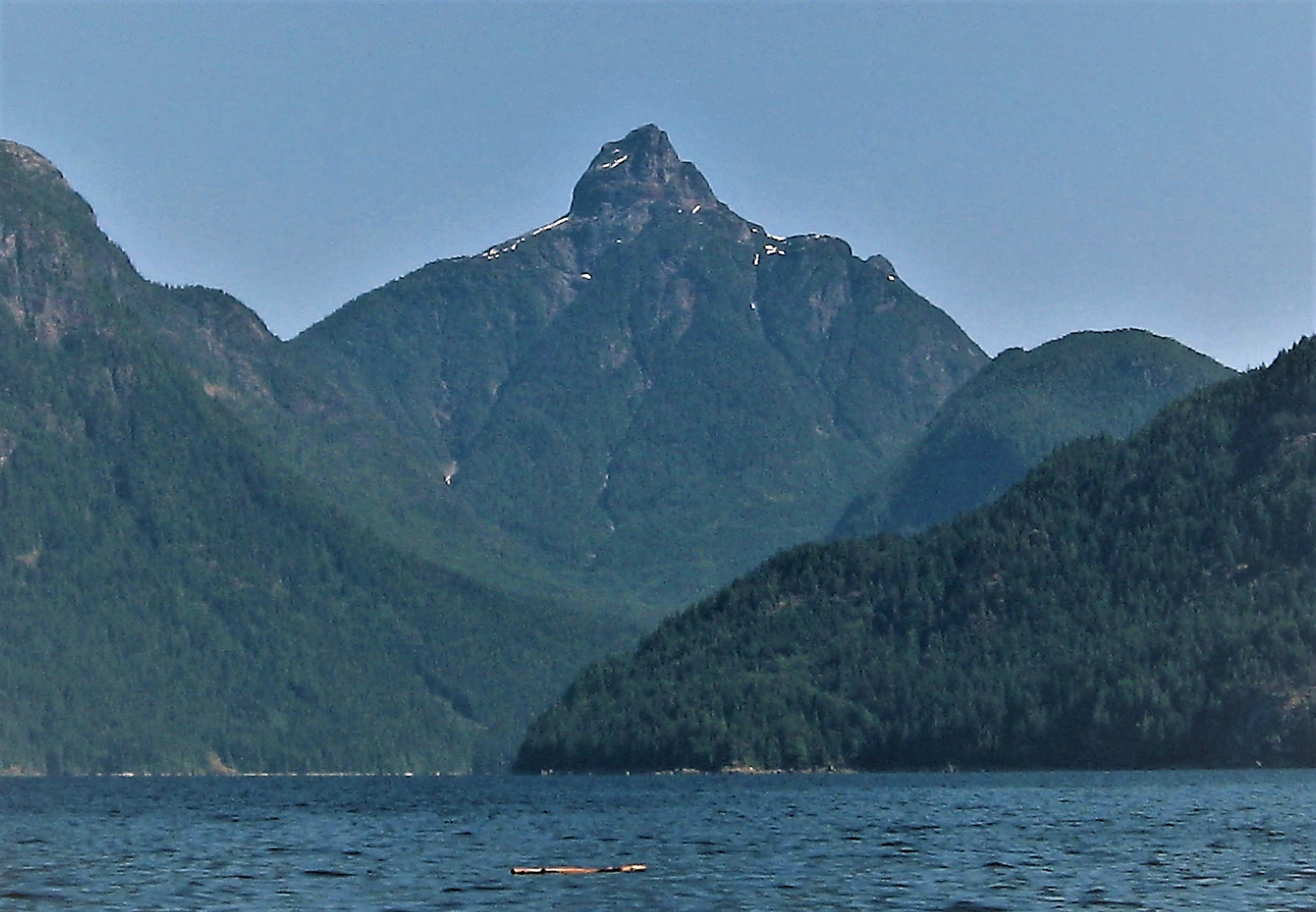
Mount Churchill from Jervis Inlet

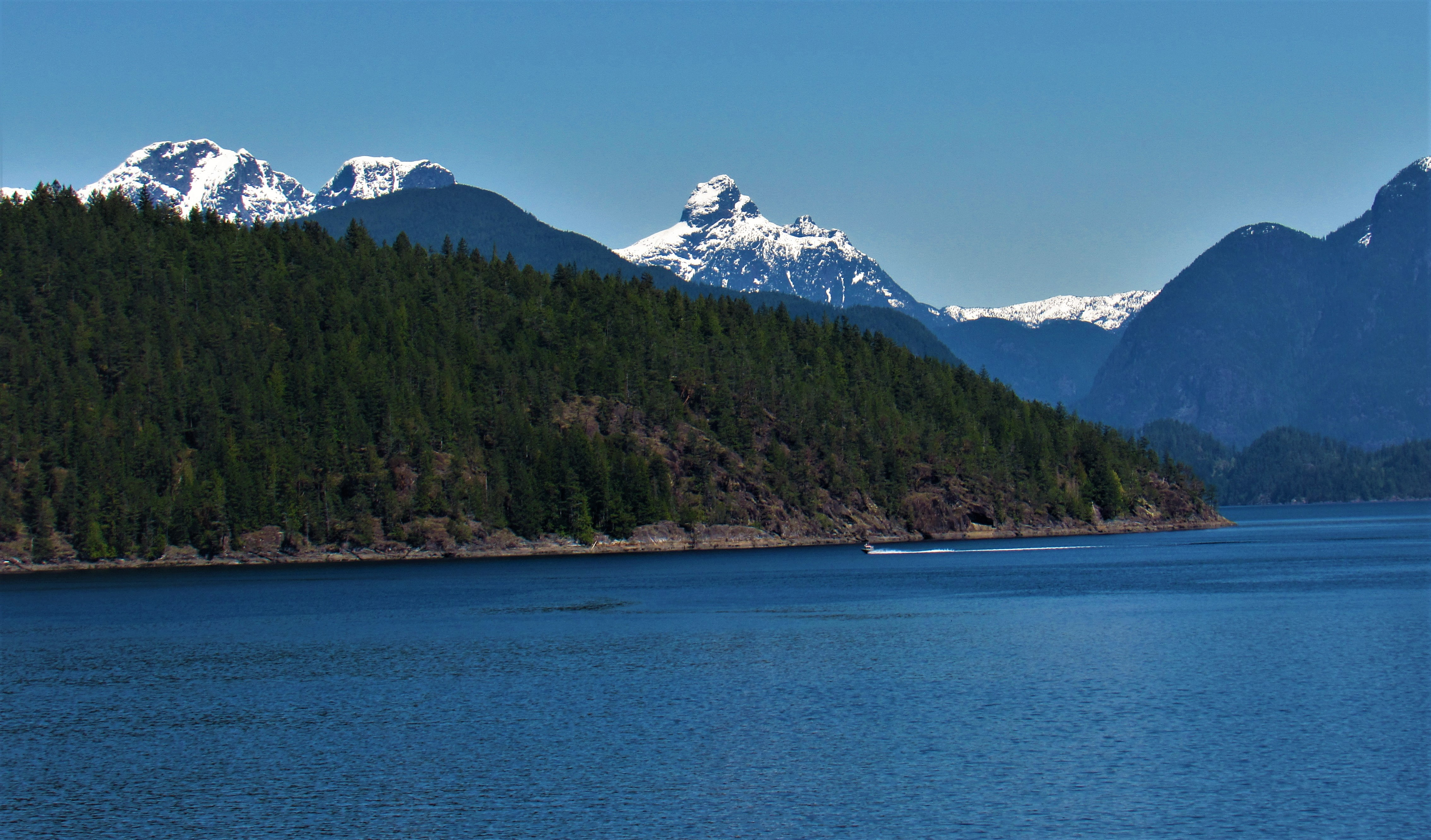
Mount Churchill (center) and part of Marlborough Highlands (left)

== See also ==
- Geography of British Columbia
