= Mount Arthur (British Columbia) =

Mountain in British Columbia, Canada

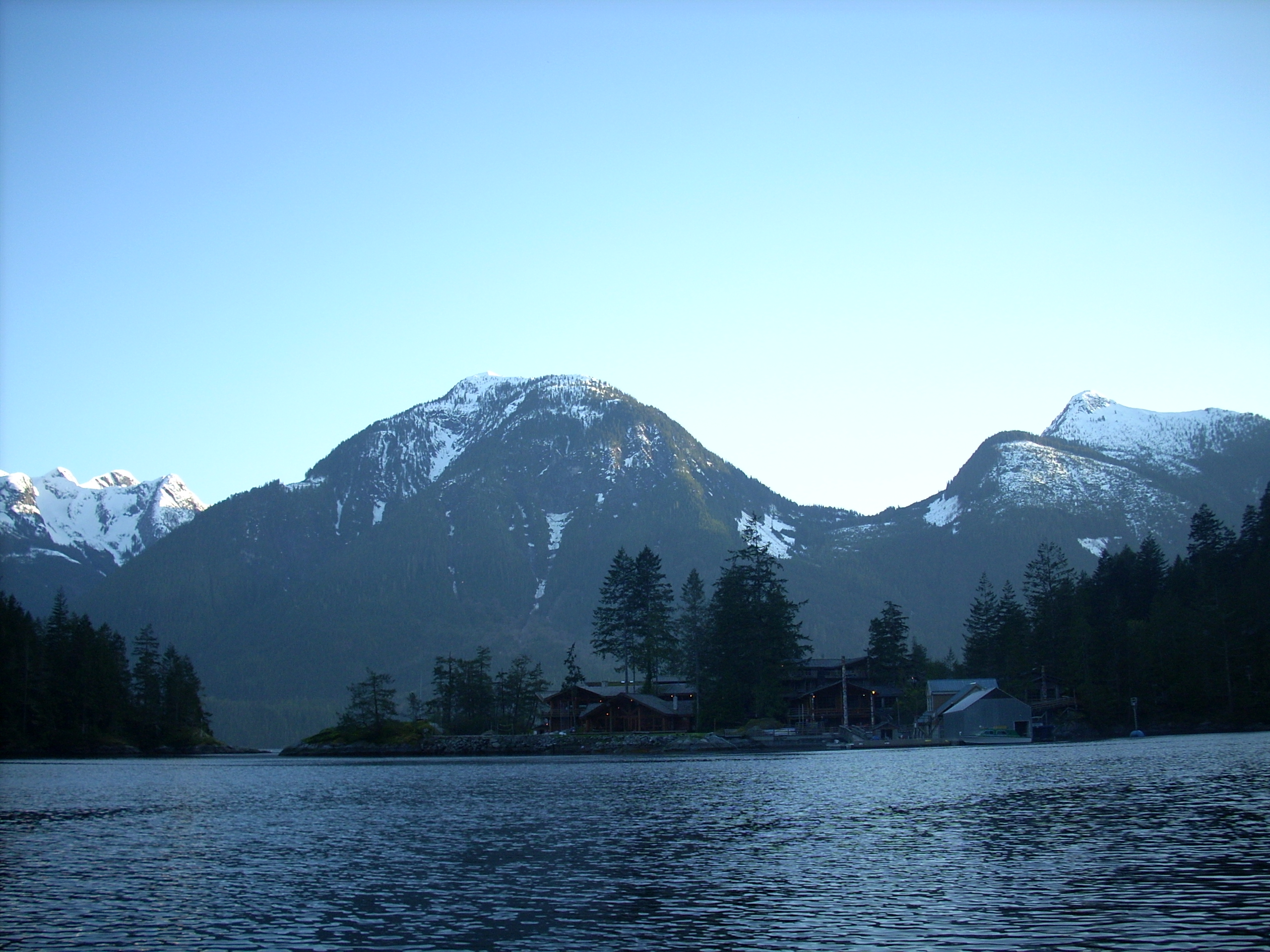
- Mount Arthur

Highest point
- Elevation: 1,619 m (5,312 ft)
- Prominence: 255 m (837 ft)
- Parent peak: Mount Wellington
- Coordinates: 50°07′02″N 123°56′18″W

Geography
- Location within British Columbia
- Interactive map of Mount Arthur
- Location: NE of Powell River, New Westminster Land District, British Columbia, Canada
- District: New Westminster Land District
- Parent range: Pacific Ranges
- Topo map: NTS 92J4 Princess Louisa Inlet

Mount Arthur is a mountain located at the Queen Reach arm of the Jervis Inlet within the Pacific Ranges of the Coast Mountains in British Columbia Canada. The mountain was named during the 1860 survey by HMS Plumper who charted all of the area and named the mountain after Prince Arthur William Patrick who was the seventh son of Queen Victoria and Prince Albert of England.

== Gallery ==
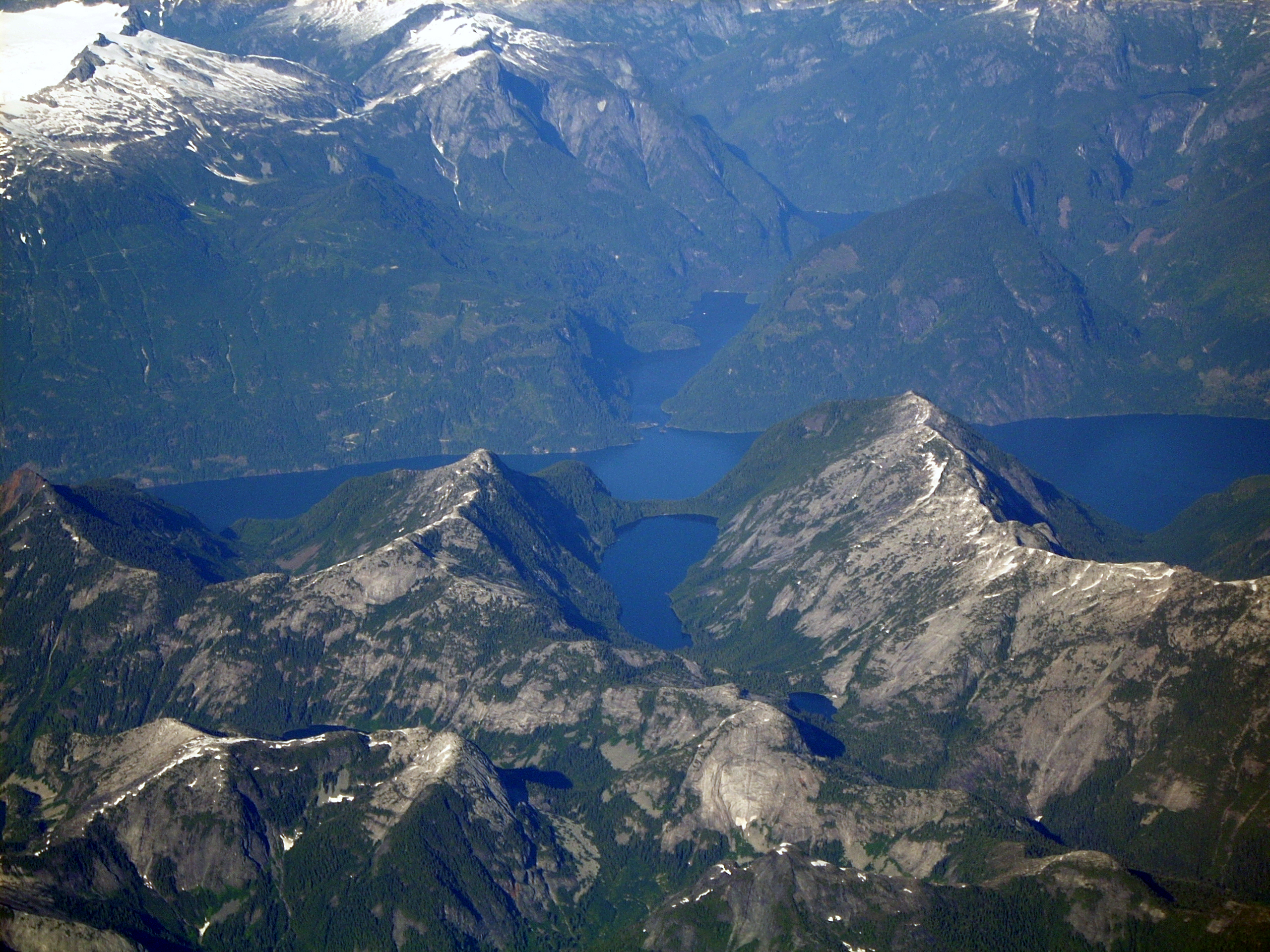
Mount Arthur is next to Mount Wellington with McCannel Lake center foreground

== See also ==
- Royal eponyms in Canada
