= Mount Alice =

Mount Alice may refer to:

- Mount Alice (Alaska) in Alaska, USA
- Mount Alice (British Columbia) in British Columbia, Canada
- Mount Alice (California) in California, USA
- Mount Alice (Colorado) in Colorado, USA
- Mount Alice (Falkland Islands) in West Falkland, Falkland Islands
