= Mount Frederick William =

Mountain in British Columbia, Canada

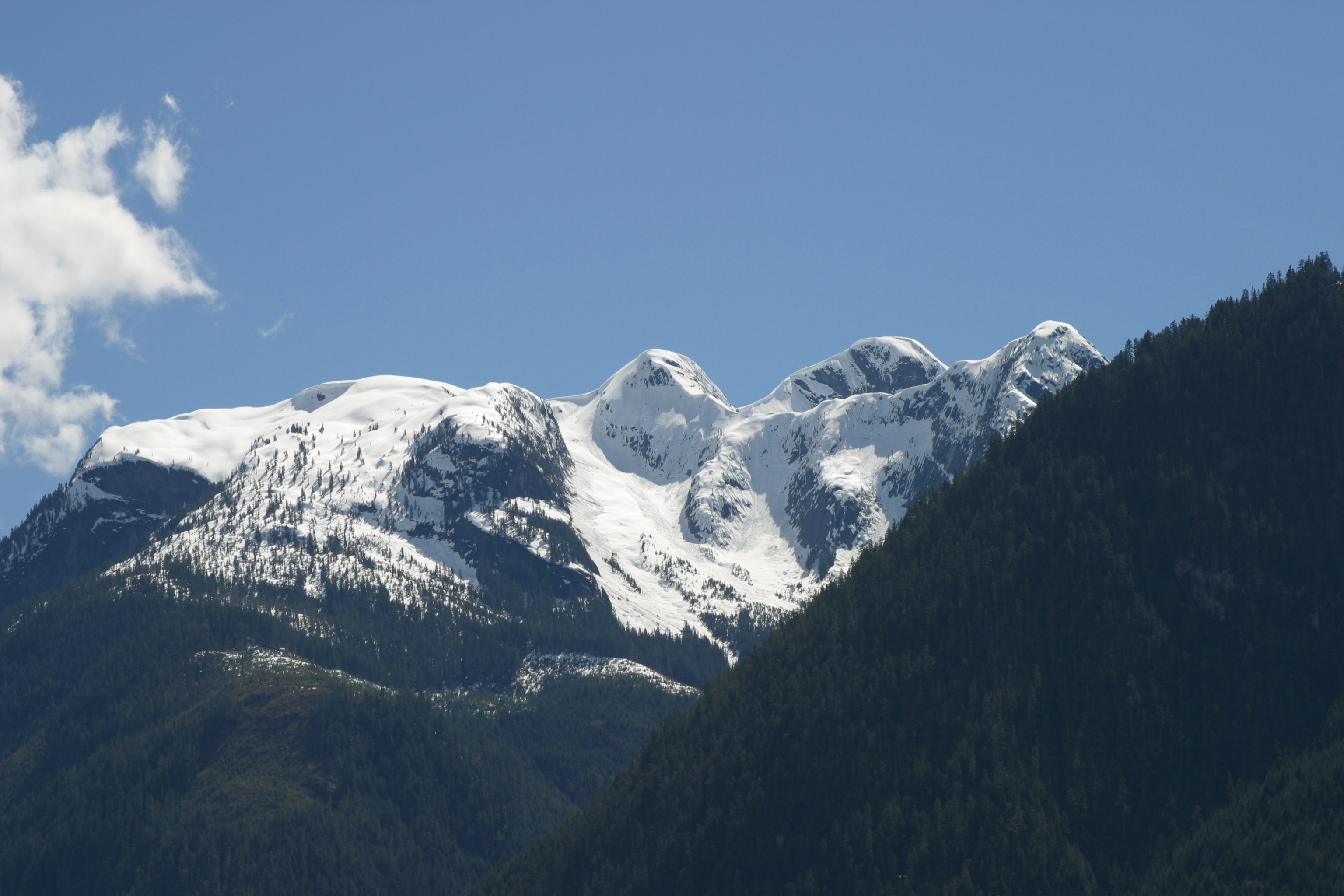
- Mt. Frederick William

Highest point
- Elevation: 1,818 m (5,965 ft)
- Prominence: W. of N. end of Princess Royal Reach, New Westminster Land District
- Coordinates: 50°04′58.3″N 123°52′01.3″W

Geography
- Location within British Columbia
- Interactive map of Mount Frederick William
- Location: Jervis Inlet , British Columbia, Canada
- District: New Westminster Land District
- Parent range: Pacific Ranges
- Topo map: NTS 92J4 Princess Louisa Inlet

Mount Frederick William is a mountain located at the Queen Reach arm of the Jervis Inlet within the Pacific Ranges of the Coast Mountains in British Columbia Canada. The mountain was named during the 1860 survey by HMS Plumper which charted all of the area and named the mountain after then-Prussian Crown Prince Frederick William, who had married Princess Victoria, the eldest child of Queen Victoria and Prince Albert.

This mountain has been given the nickname of Frankenstein for it has the familiar profile of the famous monster's face.

== Gallery ==
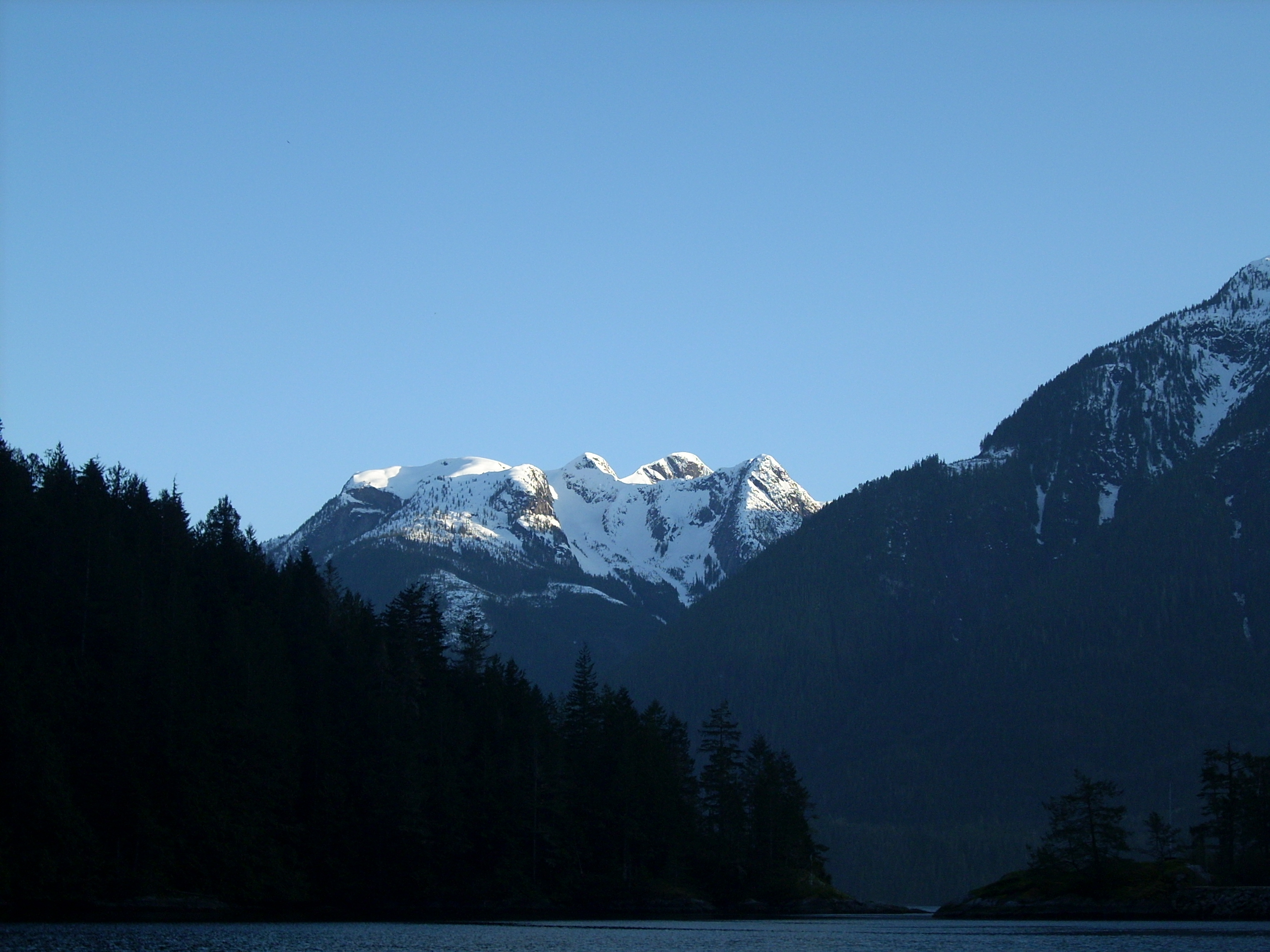
Mt. Frederick William seen from Princess Louisa Inlet at Dusk.

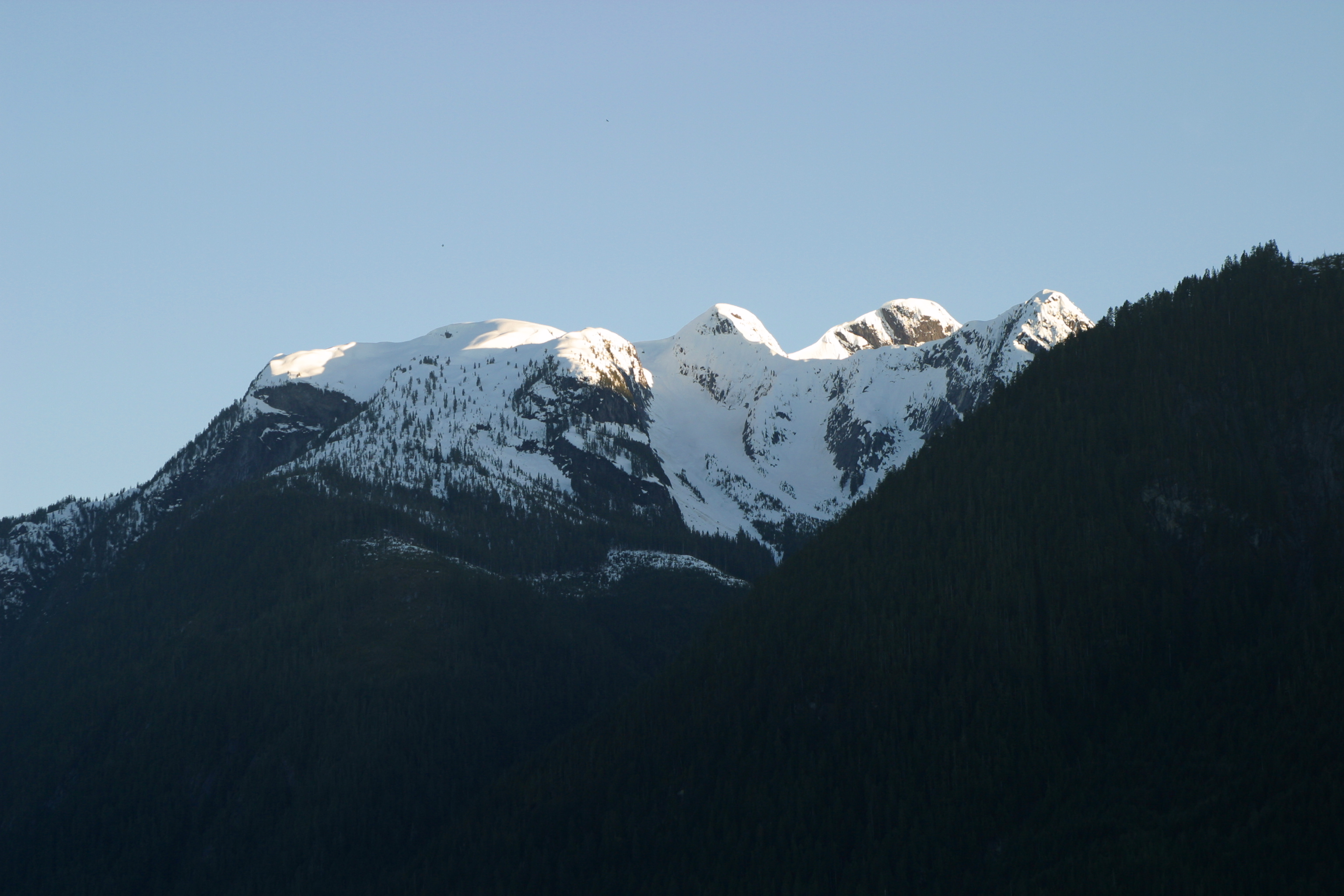
Mt. Frederick William close up

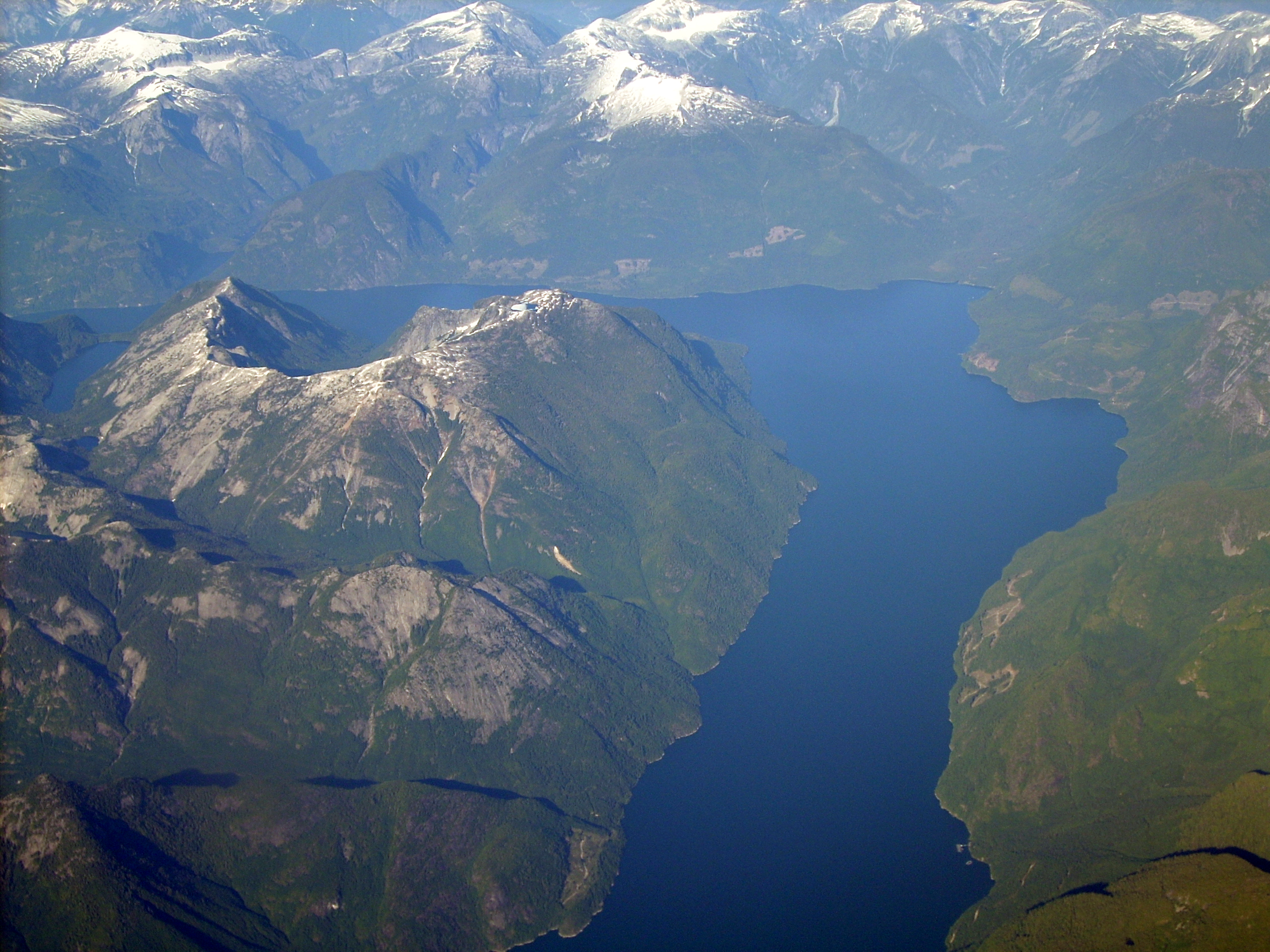
Behind Mt. Frederick William as seen from 20,000 feet (Bowl shape mountain)
