= Deserted River =

- Mouth of Deserted River
- Native name: ts'unay stulu (Shuswap)

Location
- Country: Canada
- Province: British Columbia
- District: New Westminster Land District

Physical characteristics
- Source: Deserted Lake
  - location: Pacific Ranges
  - coordinates: 50°9′49″N 123°36′00″W
  - elevation: 5,023 ft (1,531 m)
- Mouth: Jervis Inlet
  - location: Deserted Bay
  - coordinates: 50°05′32″N 123°44′41″W
  - elevation: 0 ft (0 m)

The Deserted River, officially known as ts'unay stulu since 2023, is a short river in the Jervis Inlet region of the South Coast of British Columbia, Canada, flowing in a short course generally southwest into the eastern "elbow" of that inlet, to the southeast of Malibu, British Columbia. The river was named in association with the location of its outlet, Deserted Bay, which was named in 1860 by the British Admiralty. The name derives from a deserted village of the Shishalh (Sechelt) people on the south shore of the bay, who fled the area after the smallpox epidemics of the 1860s. Previous (likely false) reports suggest it was deserted due to grizzly bear attacks. Its previous name was Tsuahdie, meaning "place to shelter".

Approximately 13 km (8 mi) in length, the river and its east fork, Tsuahdi Creek, drain the western flank of the mountain spine between the Jervis Inlet drainage and that of the Elaho River to the east, and its length includes the 1.2 km (0.7 mi) length of the unofficially-named Deserted Lake. Issuing from the lake at its south end, the river plunges 670 meters (2,200 ft), with additional cascades in addition to the main falls totalling 830 meters (2,720 ft). The cascade, which is not officially named and is formally unmeasured, is known as Deserted River Falls.

== See also ==
- List of rivers of British Columbia
- List of waterfalls of Canada
- Alfred Creek Falls
