= Mount Alfred =

Mountain in British Columbia, Canada

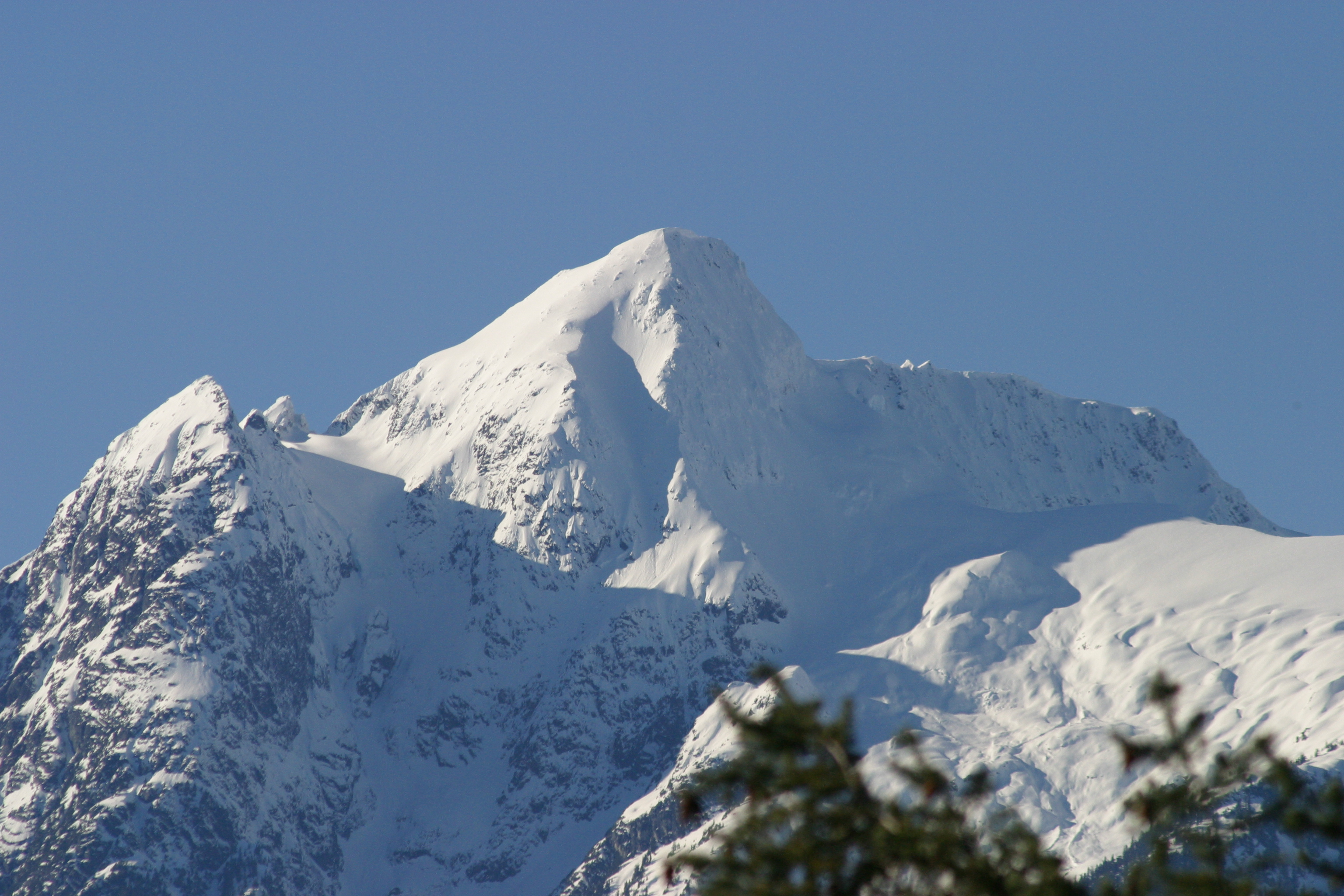
- Snow-covered Mt. Alfred

Highest point
- Elevation: 2,420 m (7,940 ft)
- Prominence: 1,318 m (4,324 ft)
- Listing: Mountains of British Columbia
- Coordinates: 50°12′22″N 124°04′36″W

Geography
- Location within British Columbia
- Interactive map of Mount Alfred
- Location: Jervis Inlet , British Columbia, Canada
- District: New Westminster Land District
- Parent range: Pacific Ranges
- Topo map: NTS 92K1 Powell Lake

Climbing
- First ascent: 1929 by Arthur Tinniswood Dalton and Percy Williams Easthope

Mount Alfred is a mountain located at the Queen Reach arm and head of the Jervis Inlet within the Pacific Ranges of the Coast Mountains in British Columbia, Canada. The mountain is the highest in the portion of the mainland between Jervis and Toba Inlets, with its 1,318 metres (4,324 ft) prominence defined by the pass at the head of the Skwawka River, which feeds the head of Jervis Inlet. The unofficially-named Alfred Creek Falls, on Alfred Creek which drains off the mountain's glaciers southeast into the Skwawka, is one of Canada's highest waterfalls at 700 metres (2,297 ft).

== Naming ==
The mountain was named during the 1860 survey by HMS Plumper who charted all of the area and was named after Alfred Edward "Affie", who was the third child and second son of Queen Victoria and Prince Albert of England, and who was Duke of Edinburgh from his birth in 1844 until his death in 1900.

The first ascent of Mount Alfred was made in 1929 by Arthur Tinniswood Dalton and Percy Williams Easthope.

== Gallery ==
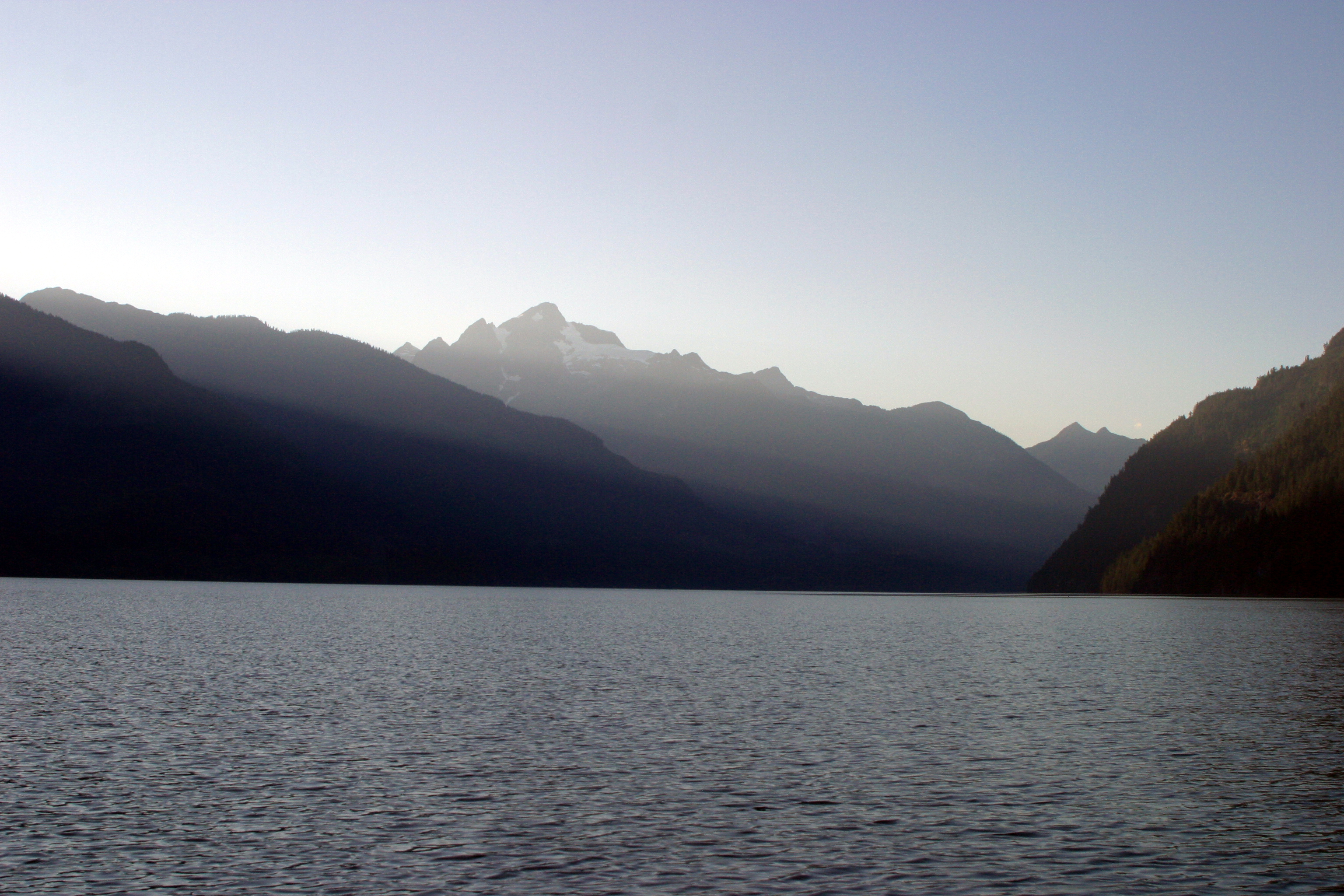
Mt.Alfred seen from the Jervis Inlet at Dusk.

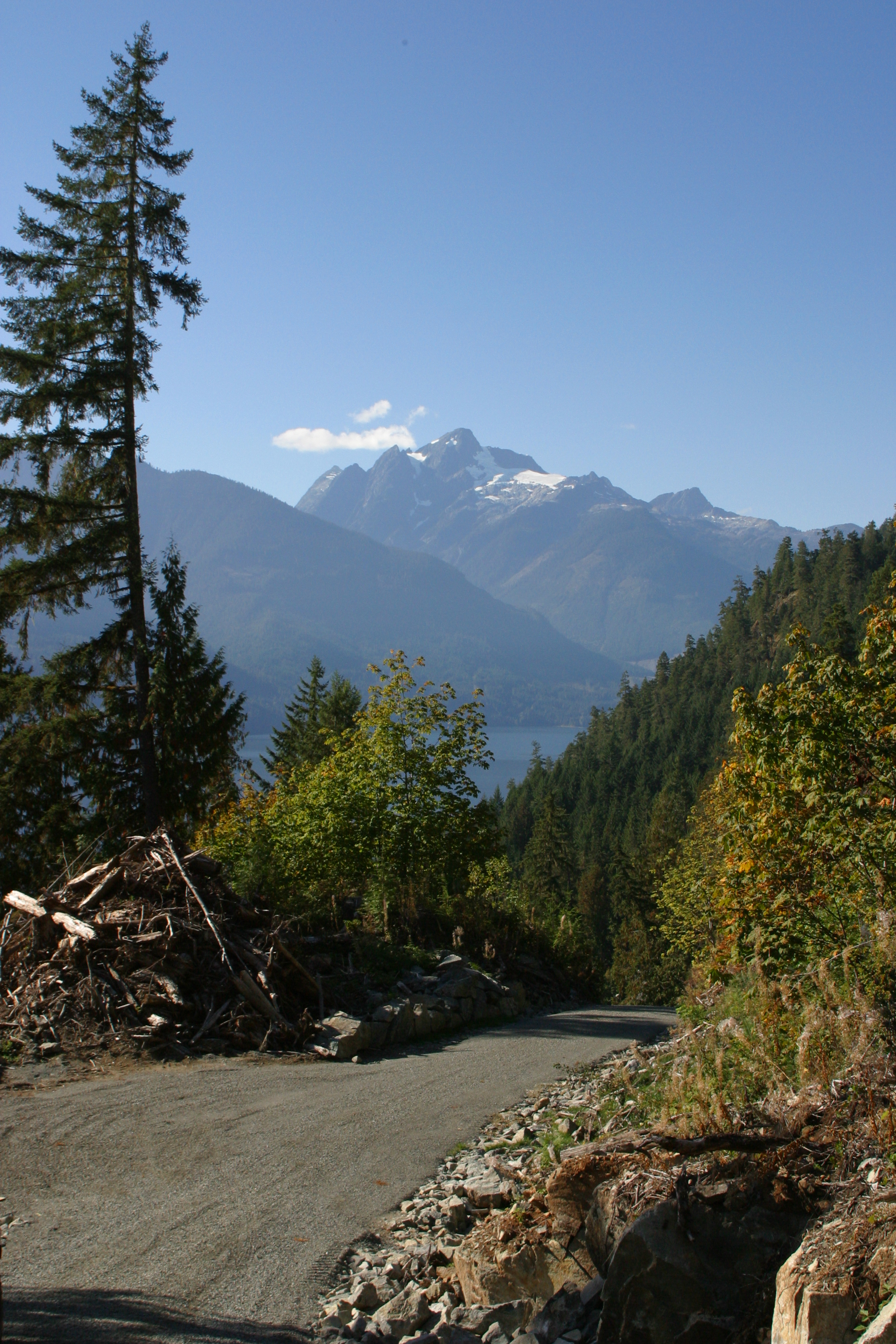
Mt. Alfred as seen from the Helena side of the mountain

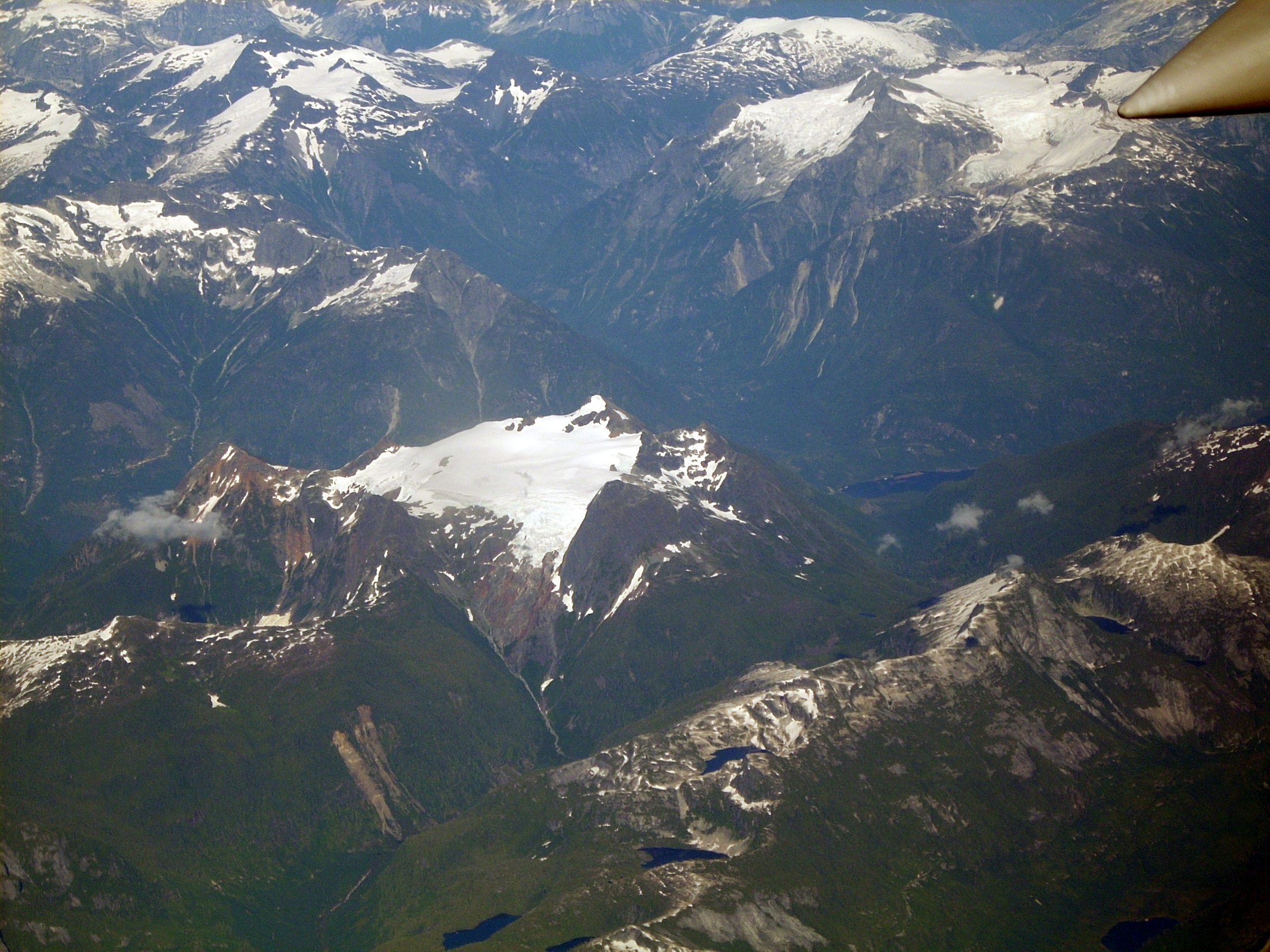
Behind Mt. Alfred from 20,000 feet.

== See also ==
- Royal eponyms in Canada
