= List of rivers of the Rocky Mountains =

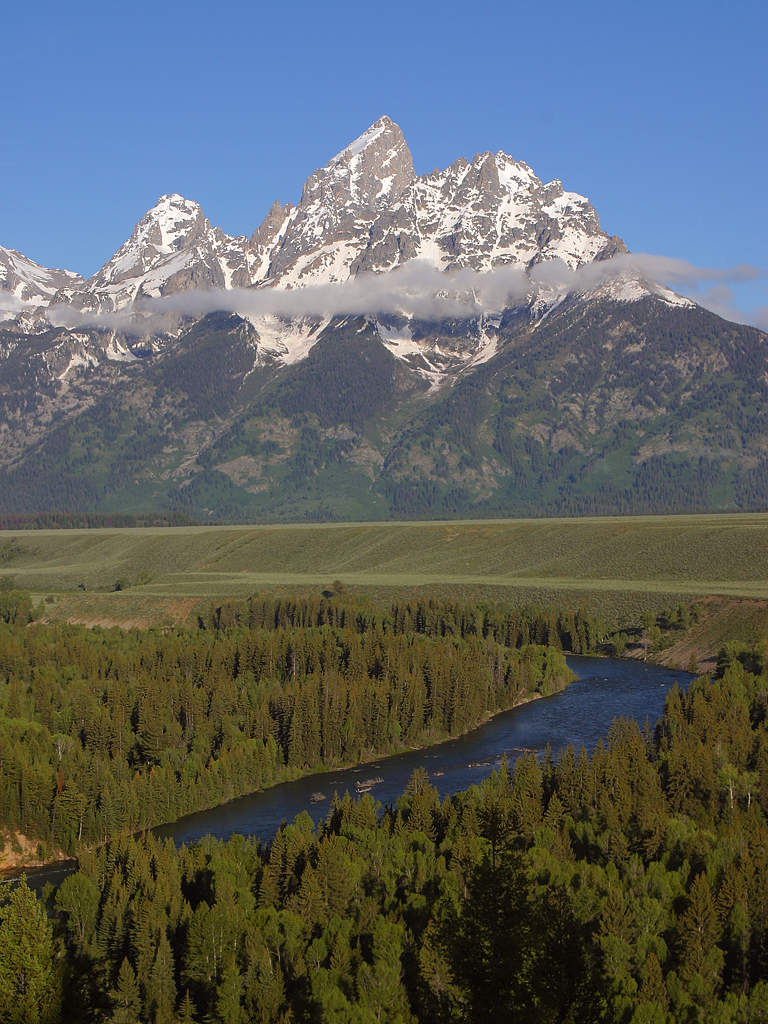
The Cathedral Group of the Teton Range in Grand Teton National Park, Wyoming.

This is a partial list of rivers of the Rocky Mountains in Canada and the United States. For a full listing of rivers in the Canadian portion of the range, see List of rivers of the Canadian Rockies.

== Gulf of Mexico drainage ==
- Rio Grande
  - Pecos River
- Missouri River
  - Jefferson River
    - Beaverhead River
      - Red Rock River
      - Ruby River
    - Big Hole River
      - Wise River
  - Madison River
    - Firehole River
    - Gibbon River
  - Gallatin River
  - Cheyenne River
  - Dearborn River
  - Sun River
  - Smith River
  - Marias River
  - Milk River
  - Judith River
  - Kansas River
  - Musselshell River
  - Yellowstone River
    - Lamar River
    - Gardner River
    - Shields River
    - Boulder River
    - Stillwater River
    - Clarks Fork Yellowstone River
    - Bighorn River also known as Wind River
    - Tongue River
    - Powder River
  - Platte River
    - North Platte River
    - South Platte River
- Arkansas River

== Arctic Ocean drainage ==
- Athabasca River
- Peace River
  - Parsnip River
    - Misinchinka River
- Finlay River
- Liard River
  - Muskwa River
  - Kechika River
    - Gataga River
  - Toad River

== Northwest Pacific Ocean drainage ==
- Columbia River
  - Kicking Horse River
  - Blaeberry River
  - Bush River
  - Wood River
  - Bitterroot River
  - Kootenay River
    - Elk River
    - Bull River
    - Vermilion River
  - Clark Fork River
  - Clearwater River
  - Coeur d'Alene River
  - Salmon River
  - Snake River
    - Malad River
  - Payette River
  - Selway River
  - Lochsa River
- Fraser River
  - McGregor River
  - Thompson River

== Gulf of California drainage ==
- Colorado River
  - Gunnison River
  - Dolores River
    - San Miguel River
  - Green River
    - Price River
    - San Rafael River
    - White River
      - Bear River
    - Yampa River
  - San Juan River
    - Navajo River
    - Piedra River
    - Los Pinos River
    - Animas River

== Hudson Bay drainage ==
- South Saskatchewan River
- North Saskatchewan River
- Bow River
- Oldman River
- Red Deer River

== Great Basin drainage ==
- Bear River
  - Malad River
  - Little Bear River
    - Logan River
  - Cub River
  - Bear Lake
- Jordan River
  - American Fork
  - Big Cottonwood Creek
  - Hobble Creek
  - Provo River
  - Spanish Fork
- Weber River
  - East Canyon Creek
- San Pitch River

== See also ==
- Rocky Mountains
- List of rivers of the Canadian Rockies
- List of rivers of the Pacific Ranges
- List of rivers of the Kitimat Ranges
- List of rivers of the Boundary Ranges
- List of rivers of the Omineca Mountains
