= Princess Royal Reach =

Arm of an inlet in British Columbia

- Location within British Columbia
- Location: British Columbia, Canada
- Coordinates: 50°02′13″N 123°52′08″W
- Type: Fjord
- Part of: Jervis Inlet
- Max. length: 33 km (21 mi)
- Max. depth: 552 m (1,811 ft)

Princess Royal Reach is the second arm of Jervis Inlet and is located within the Coast Mountain Range of British Columbia, Canada. This arm was named during the 1860 survey by HMS Plumper which charted all of the area and named the arm after Victoria ("Vicky") the Princess Royal of England who was the first child born in 1840 to Queen Victoria and Prince Albert of England.

== See also ==
- List of fjords in Canada
- Royal eponyms in Canada
