= List of rivers of the Canadian Rockies =

This is a list of rivers within or originating in, or in one case transiting, the Canadian Rockies.

== Hudson Bay and Pacific Ocean drainage ==
- Divide Creek

== Hudson Bay (Atlantic Ocean) drainage ==
- North Saskatchewan River
- South Saskatchewan River
  - Bow River
    - Elbow River
  - Oldman River
    - Crowsnest River
- Red Deer River

== Pacific Ocean drainage ==
- Columbia River
  - Flathead River
    - Kootenay River
      - Elk River
        - Fording River
      - Vermilion River
        - Simpson River
  - Kicking Horse River
    - Amiskwi River
    - Yoho River
      - Little Yoho River
- Fraser River
  - Torpy River
  - Swiftcurrent Creek
  - Robson River
- Kiwetinok River
- Blaeberry River
- Bush River
- Coal Creek
- Lizard Creek
- Emerald River
- Gataga River
- Moose Creek
- McKale River
- Morkill River
- Valenciennes River
- Wigwam River

== Arctic Ocean drainage ==
- Mackenzie River
  - Liard River
    - Fort Nelson River
      - Muskwa River
      - Sikanni Chief River
    - Trout River
  - Slave River
    - Athabasca River
      - Whirlpool River
    - Peace River
      - Smoky River
        - Jackpine River
        - Kakwa River
        - Muddywater River
        - Wapiti River
- Ospika River

== See also ==
- List of rivers of the Rocky Mountains
- List of rivers of the Pacific Ranges
- List of rivers of the Kitimat Ranges
- List of rivers of the Boundary Ranges
- List of rivers of the Omineca Mountains
