= Skwawka River =

River in the Coast Mountains, British Columbia, Canada

Coordinates: 50°13′00″N 123°59′00″W

The Skwawka River is a medium-sized river in the Pacific Ranges of the Coast Mountains in British Columbia, Canada, flowing southeast 20 kilometers (12 mi) into the head of Queens Reach, which is the uppermost end of Jervis Inlet. The pass at the head of the river, which connects to the head of the Little Toba River, is the prominence col for Mount Alfred, which lies just west of the river's mouth and is the highest summit between Jervis and Toba Inlets. Above the river's lower reaches, on the east flank of Mount Alfred, is 700 meters (2,300 ft) Alfred Creek Falls, one of North America's highest.

== See also ==
- List of rivers of British Columbia
