= Alfred Creek =

Watercourse in British Columbia, Canada

Coordinates: 50°12′05″N 124°00′52″W

Alfred Creek, at one time known as Glacier Creek, is a creek flowing off the east flank of Mount Alfred, southeast into the lower reaches of the Skwawka River near its mouth into the head of Jervis Inlet, which is on the South Coast of British Columbia, Canada.

== Name origin ==
The name is derived from that of Mount Alfred, which was named in 1860 after the second son of Queen Victoria and Prince Albert, and Duke of Edinburgh from his birth in 1844 until his death in 1900.

== Alfred Creek Falls ==
Alfred Creek Falls is a waterfall which cascades 61 m (200 ft) down the steep western face of Mount Alfred.

In January 2018, the estimated height of the waterfall was greatly reduced from 700 m (2,300 ft) to just 61 m (200 ft) following an analysis of improved terrain modelling.

== See also ==
- List of waterfalls in Canada
- List of rivers of British Columbia
- Deserted River Falls
