= Mount Alice (British Columbia) =

Mountain in British Columbia, Canada

- Location within British Columbia
- Interactive map of Mount Alice

Highest point
- Elevation: 1,798 m (5,899 ft)
- Prominence: 293 m (961 ft)
- Listing: Mountains of British Columbia
- Coordinates: 50°10′10″N 124°02′17″W

Geography
- Location: Jervis Inlet, British Columbia, Canada
- District: New Westminster Land District
- Parent range: Pacific Ranges
- Topo map: NTS 92K1 Powell Lake

Mount Alice is a mountain located at the Queens Reach arm of the Jervis Inlet within the Pacific Ranges of the Coast Mountains in British Columbia Canada. The mountain was named during the 1860 survey by HMS Plumper who charted all of the known area and named the mountain after Alice Maud Mary who was the third child of Queen Victoria and Prince Albert.

== See also ==
- Royal eponyms in Canada
