= Mount Wellington (British Columbia) =

Mountain in British Columbia, Canada

- Location within British Columbia
- Interactive map of Mount Wellington

Highest point
- Elevation: 1,727 m (5,666 ft)
- Prominence: 631 m (2,070 ft)on the west side of Queens Reach Jervis Inlet, northeast of Powell River (city)
- Coordinates: 50°07′43.76″N 123°55′01.82″W

Geography
- Location: Jervis Inlet, British Columbia, Canada
- District: New Westminster Land District
- Parent range: Pacific Ranges
- Topo map: NTS 92J4 Princess Louisa Inlet

Mount Wellington is a mountain located at the Queens Reach arm of the Jervis Inlet within the Pacific Ranges of the Coast Mountains in British Columbia Canada. The mountain was named during the 1860 survey by HMS Plumper who charted all of the area and named the mountain after Duke of Wellington who defeated Napoleon at the famous battle of Waterloo.
