= Prince of Wales Reach =

First arm of Jervis Inlet in British Columbia, Canada

- Location within British Columbia
- Location: British Columbia, Canada
- Coordinates: 49°54′16″N 123°54′47″W
- Type: Fjord
- Part of: Jervis Inlet
- Max. length: 40 km (25 mi)
- Max. depth: 670 m (2,200 ft)

Prince of Wales Reach is the first arm of the Jervis Inlet and is located within the Coast Mountain Range of British Columbia, Canada. This arm was named during the 1860 survey by HMS Plumper who charted all of the area and was named after Albert Edward - the Prince Of Wales, later Edward VII, who was born in 1841 and was the second child of Queen Victoria and Prince Albert of England.

== See also ==
- List of fjords in Canada
- Royal eponyms in Canada
