= Jervis Inlet =

Inlet in British Columbia, Canada

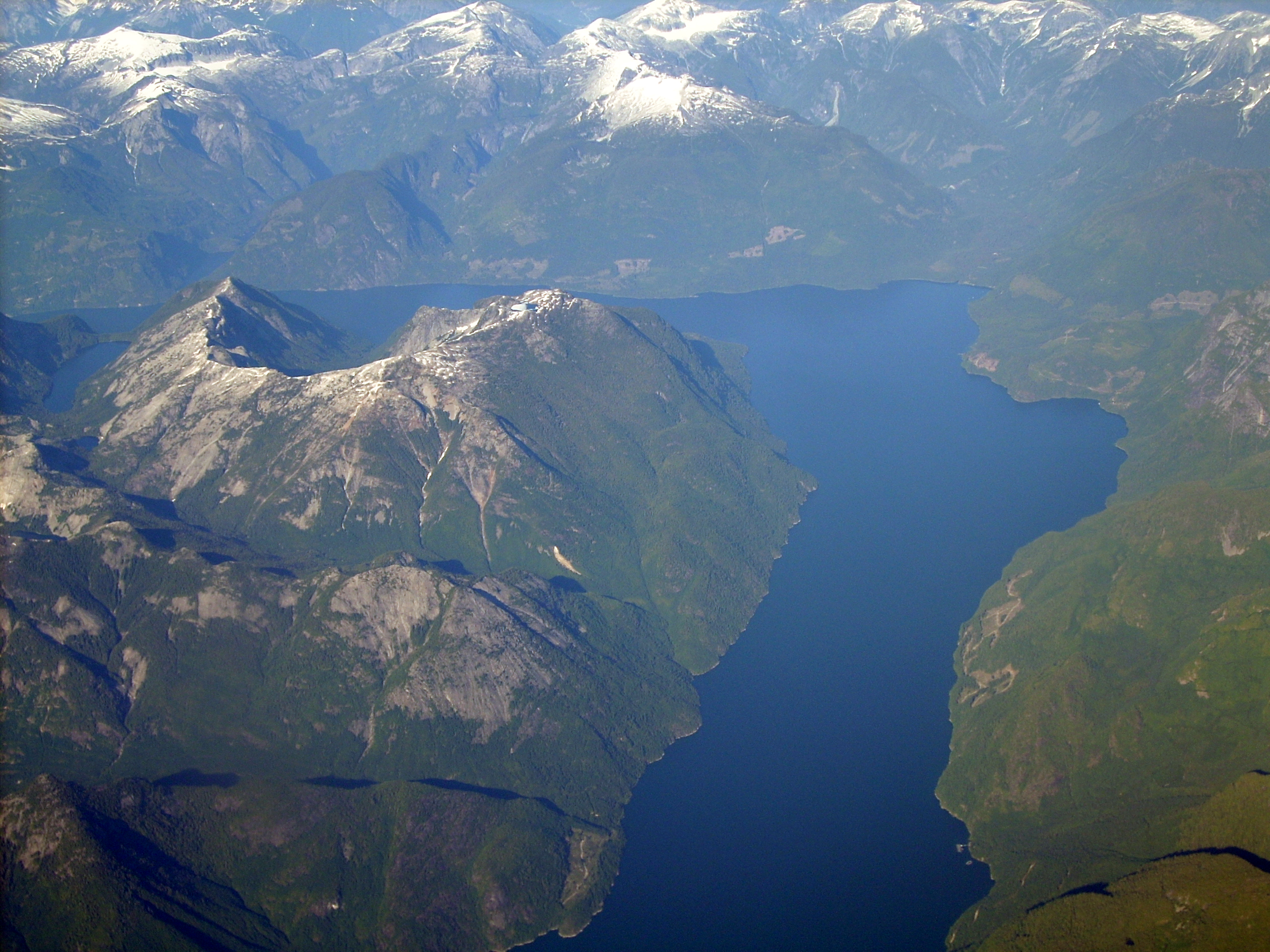
- Mount Frederick William & the "elbow" of the inlet

- Location within British Columbia

- Map of Jervis Inlet
- Location: British Columbia, Canada
- Coordinates: 49°55′25″N 123°58′27″W
- Type: Fjord
- Part of: Salish Sea
- Max. length: 89 km (55 mi)
- Max. depth: 670 m (2,200 ft)

Jervis Inlet (locally /ˈdʒɑːrvɪs/ JAR-viss) is one of the principal inlets of the British Columbia Coast, about 95 km (59 mi) northwest of Vancouver, and the third of such inlets north of the 49th parallel, the first of which is Burrard Inlet, Vancouver's harbour.

== Geography ==
It stretches 89 km (55 mi) from its head at the mouth of the short 18 km (11 mi) Skwawka River to its opening into the Strait of Georgia near Texada Island. It is the deepest fjord on the British Columbia coast with a maximum depth of 670 m (2,200 ft).

The inlet is made up of three arms or reaches:

- Prince of Wales Reach
- Princess Royal Reach
- Queens Reach

At its uppermost stretch is Queens Reach, which takes a sharp right-angle often seen in fjord areas, to become Princess Royal Reach. Both reaches are about 20 km (12 mi) in length. The flanks of the fjord and the valley of the Skwawka River, which feeds the head of the inlet, are the site of two of Canada's highest waterfalls, James Bruce Falls 840 metres (2,760 ft) and Alfred Creek Falls at 700 m (2,300 ft).

The most frequented and best known inlet in the area is Princess Louisa Inlet, with the Malibu Club and Young Life Camp at the Malibu Rapids, the entrance of the inlet, and Princess Louisa Marine Provincial Park, including Chatterbox Falls, at its head.

At the mouth of Jervis Inlet a passenger and vehicle ferry operated by BC Ferries connects Earls Cove (on the upper end of the Sechelt Peninsula and lower Sunshine Coast) with Saltery Bay (on the bottom end of the Malaspina Peninsula and upper Sunshine Coast).

The mouth of Sechelt Inlet connects with lekw'emin (Jervis Inlet) in the area of sḵelh (Earls Cove).

Population is sparse on the shores of lekw'emin and there is no road access to the area. Industry includes small operations in aquaculture, commercial fishing and logging, but a substantial number of independent power projects are expected to develop in coming years.

=== Climate ===
Climate data for Jervis Inlet
Month	Jan	Feb	Mar	Apr	May	Jun	Jul	Aug	Sep	Oct	Nov	Dec	Year
Record high °C (°F)	14 (57)	12.5 (54.5)	17.5 (63.5)	26.5 (79.7)	32.5 (90.5)	32 (90)	32 (90)	35 (95)	30.5 (86.9)	23 (73)	16.5 (61.7)	12.5 (54.5)	35 (95)
Mean daily maximum °C (°F)	4.2 (39.6)	5.8 (42.4)	8.8 (47.8)	12.9 (55.2)	16.8 (62.2)	19.7 (67.5)	22.6 (72.7)	22.8 (73.0)	18.7 (65.7)	12.3 (54.1)	6.8 (44.2)	4.1 (39.4)	13 (55)
Mean daily minimum °C (°F)	1.1 (34.0)	1.8 (35.2)	3.2 (37.8)	5.6 (42.1)	8.9 (48.0)	12 (54)	14.4 (57.9)	15.1 (59.2)	11.9 (53.4)	7.8 (46.0)	3.5 (38.3)	1.2 (34.2)	7.2 (45.0)
Record low °C (°F)	−7.5 (18.5)	−11 (12)	−3.9 (25.0)	0 (32)	2.5 (36.5)	5.6 (42.1)	8 (46)	9.4 (48.9)	5 (41)	−4 (25)	−10 (14)	−13.5 (7.7)	−13.5 (7.7)
Average precipitation mm (inches)	279.5 (11.00)	252.8 (9.95)	216.9 (8.54)	165.4 (6.51)	141.6 (5.57)	123.3 (4.85)	94.1 (3.70)	96.8 (3.81)	109.8 (4.32)	282 (11.1)	372.3 (14.66)	311.1 (12.25)	2,445.5 (96.28)
Source: Environment Canada

== History ==
Prior to colonization, two of the four primary sub-groups of shíshálh People had principal settlements in lekw’emin. The head of lek’wemin was the primary village site of the x̱enichen people. The name x̱enichen roughly means “go to the end until you can’t go any further” referring to the northern extent of the shíshálh "swiya", or territory. The ts’unay people had their principal village site at ts’unay (Deserted Bay) located approximately 20km south of x̱enichen.

George Vancouver named the inlet after the 1791–1795 expedition to search for the fabled Northwest Passage. In the Royal Navy tradition, Vancouver named this main waterway after his friend Rear Admiral Sir John Jervis (Earl of St. Vincent) for his victory over the Spanish fleet on February 14, 1797 at Cape St. Vincent in Portugal. He named St. Vincent's Bay (near the entrance of Jervis Inlet) after the location of the battle, St. Vincent Bay.

The three specific reaches of the inlet and mountains were named in the 1860 survey by HMS Plumper, which charted the known area in honour of members of Queen Victoria's family. The waterways named during this survey mission were: Princess Louisa Inlet, Queens Reach, Princess Royal Reach, and Prince of Wales Reach. Also named were the main mountains of the area:

- Mount Alfred
- Mount Frederick William
- Mount Arthur
- Mount Wellington
- Mount Alice
- ḵ’els (Mount Victoria)
- Mount Helena
- Mount Albert

In the early 1900s, logging and commercial fishing developed in the lekw’emin (Jervis Inlet) area. Relatively large logging camps operated at Goliath Bay, Vancouver Bay and Hotham Sound, commercial fishing was conducted by owner-operators based in Egmont, ḵalpilin (Pender Harbour) and sḵelhp (Saltery Bay), and several fish-processing plants operated in Egmont, ḵalpilin and sḵelhp.

== Gallery ==
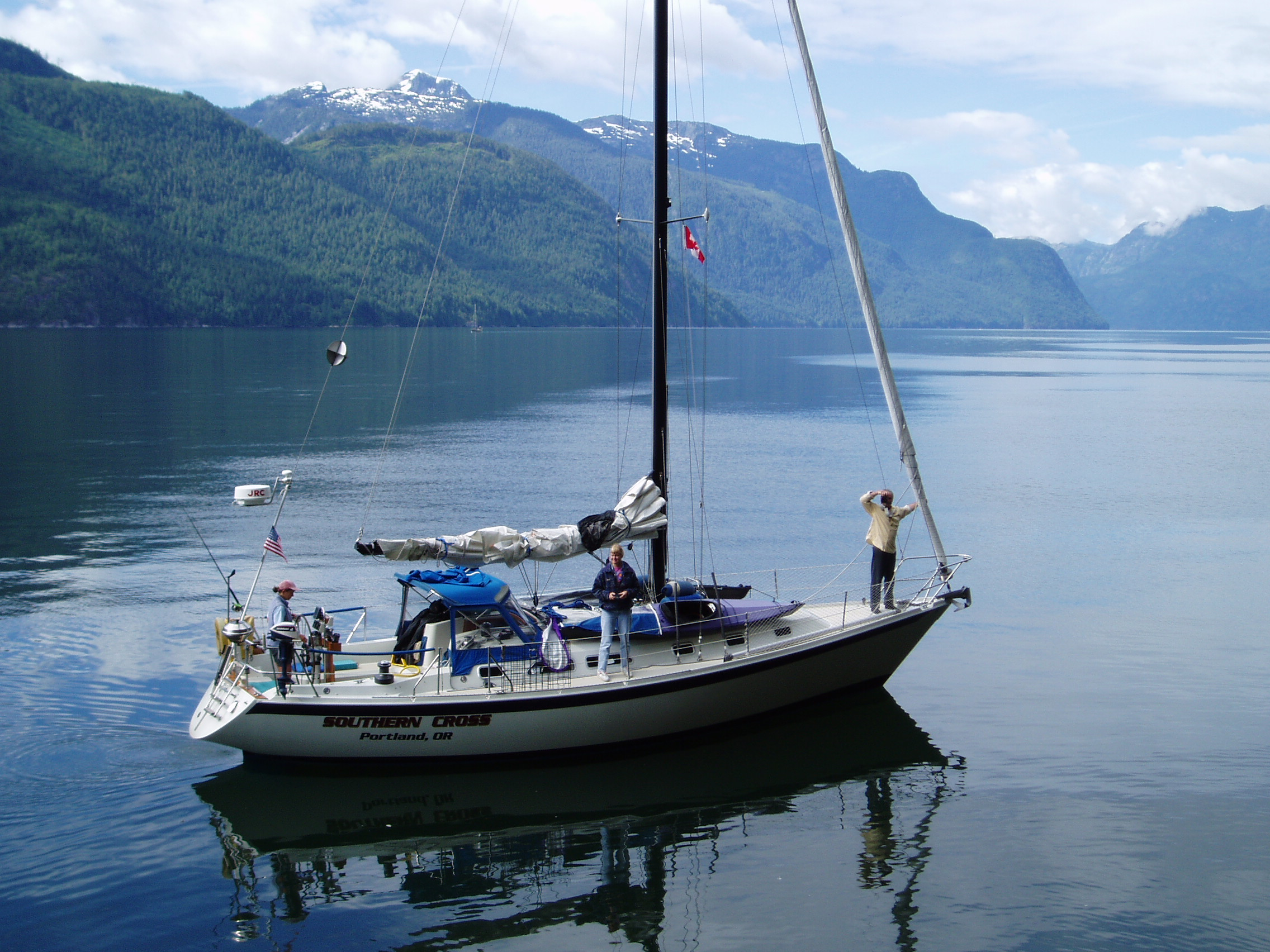
A sailboat explores Princess Royal Reach of the lekw’emin.

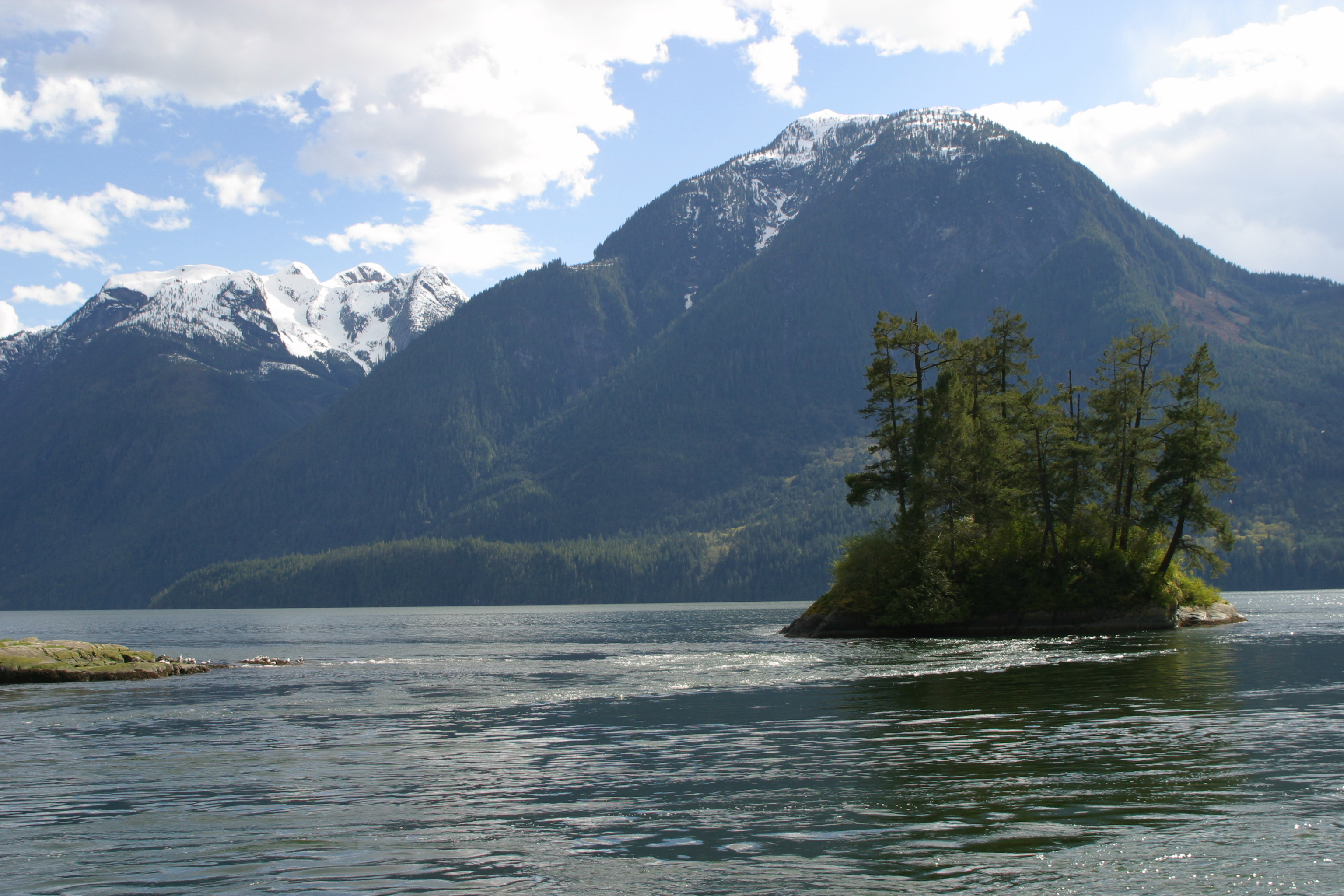
Mount Arthur and Mount Frederick William from the entrance of the Princess Louisa Inlet.

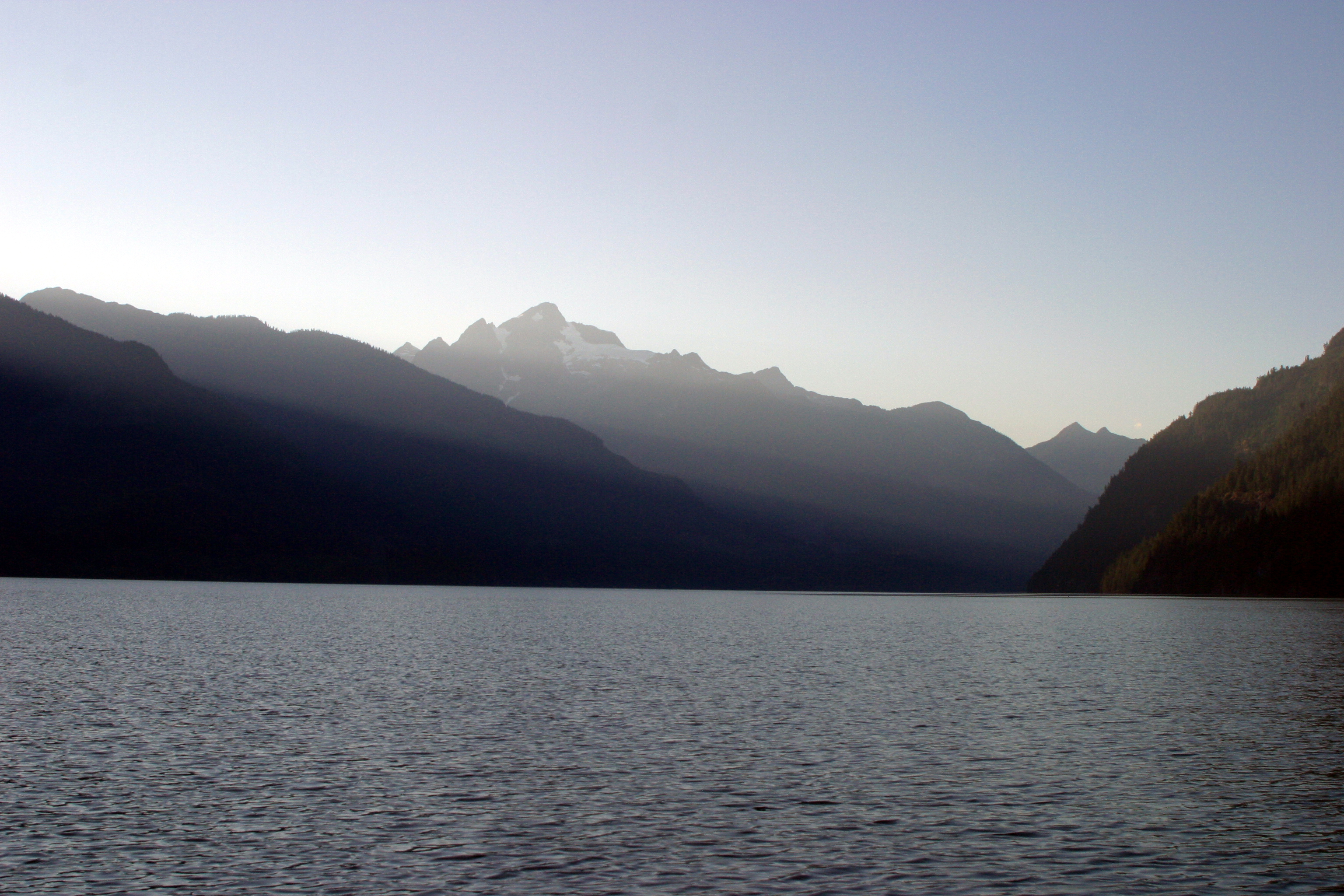
lekw’emin at dusk.

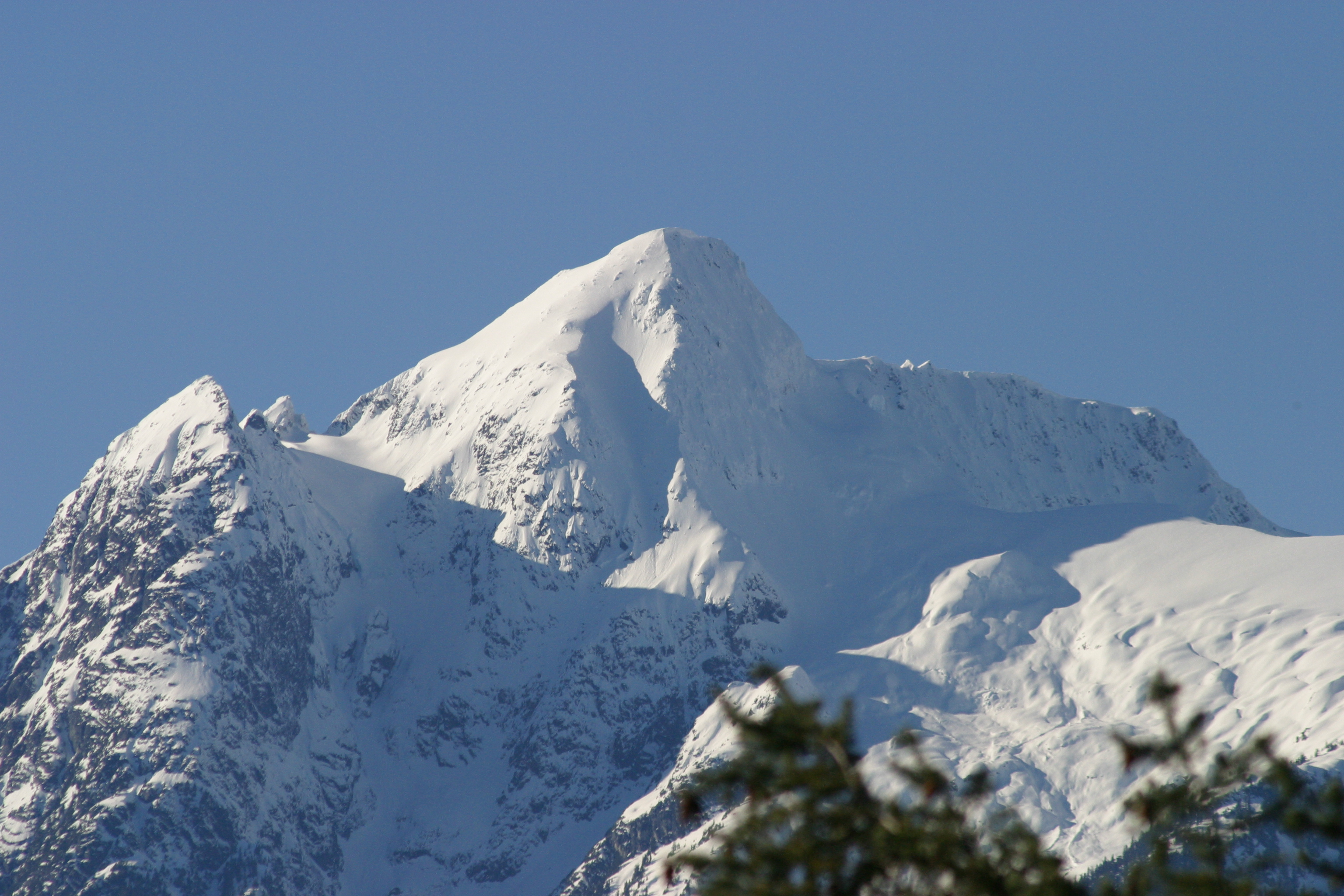
Mount Alfred seen from the inlet.

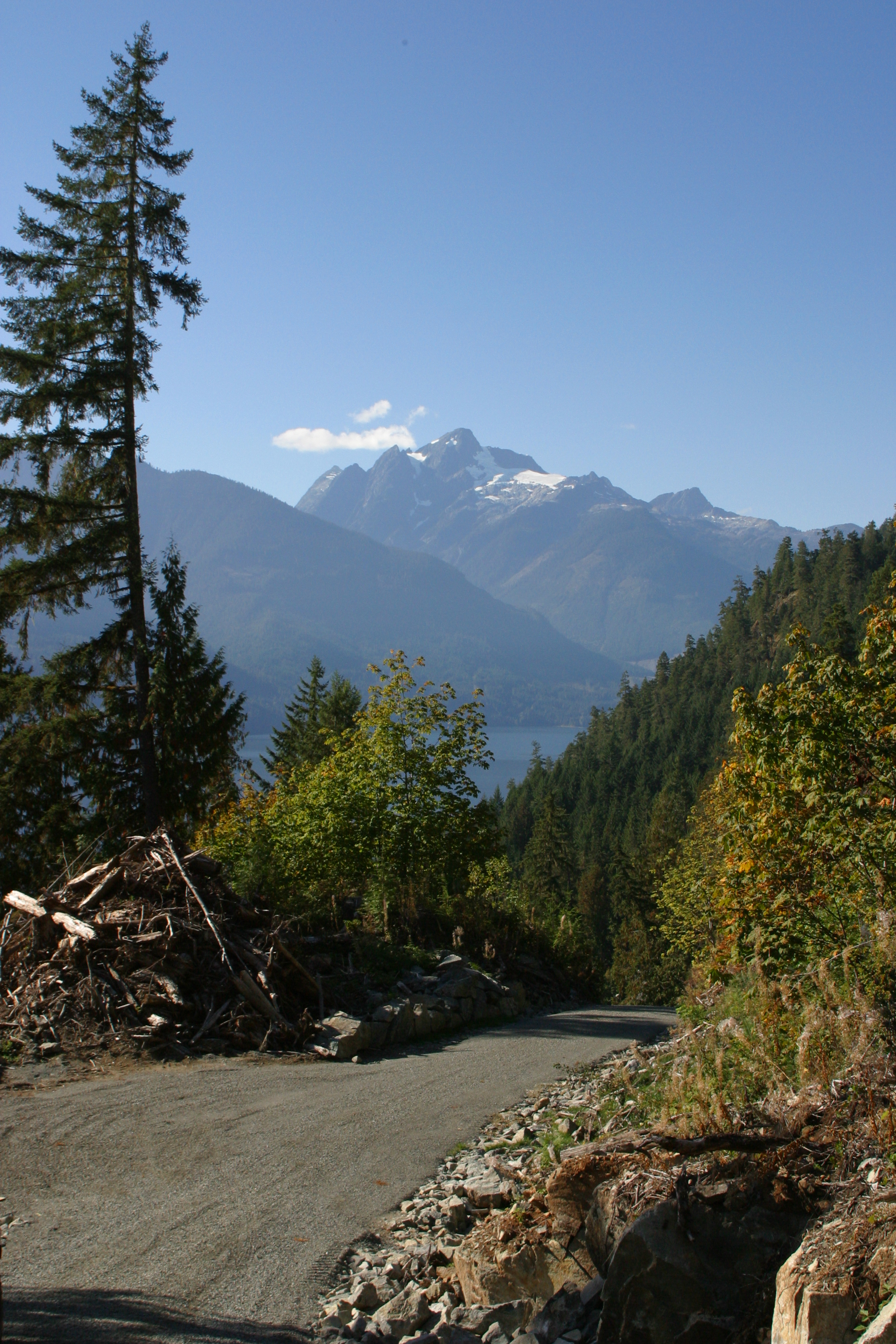
Mount Alfred from a logging road along the inlet.

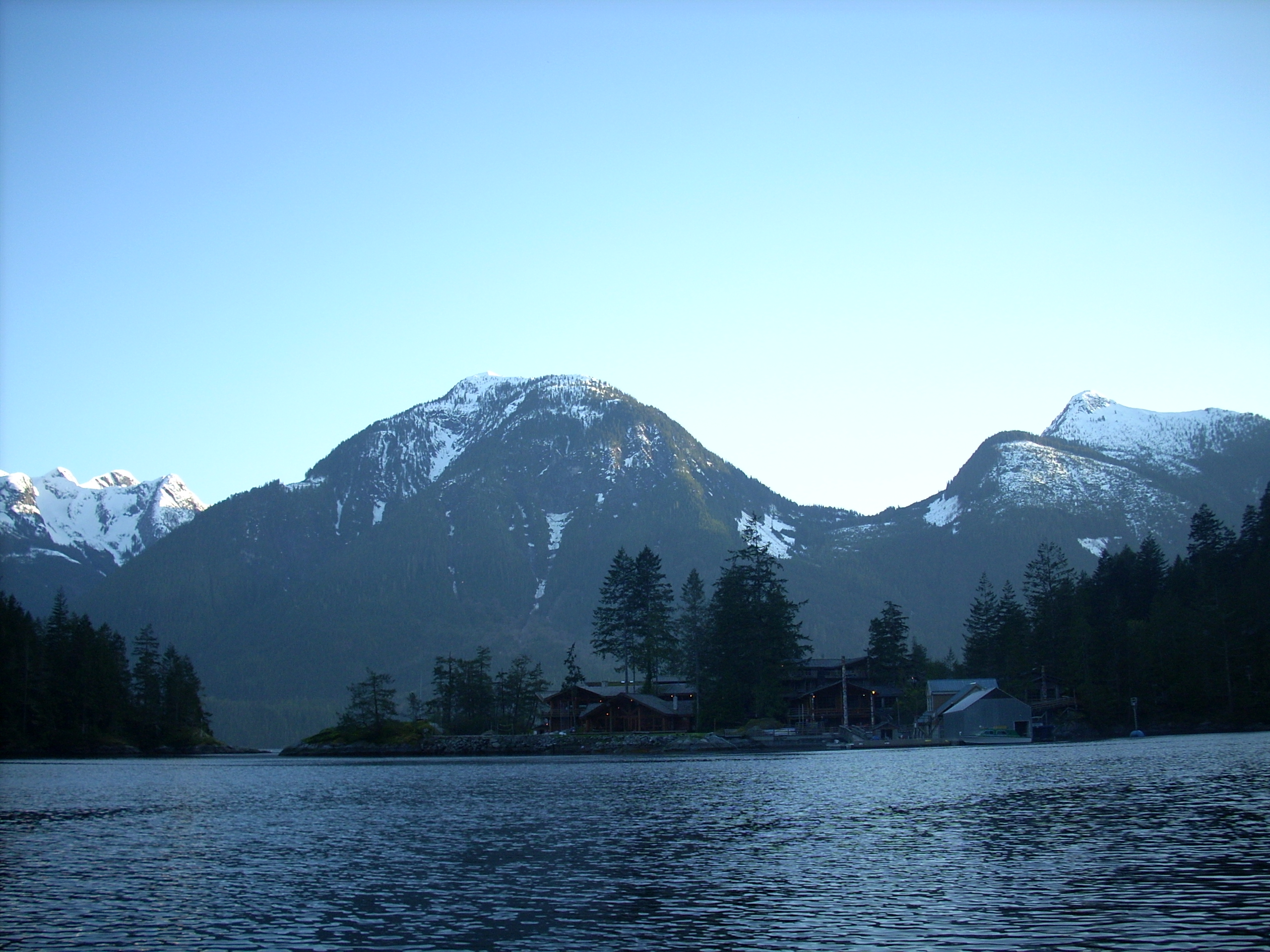
Mount Arthur rising above lekw’emin
