= Intermontane =

Within mountainous regions

Intermontane is a physiographic adjective formed from the prefix "inter-" (signifying among, between, amid, during, within, mutual, reciprocal) and the adjective "montane" (inhabiting, or growing in mountainous regions, especially cool, moist upland slopes below the timberline).

The corresponding physiographic noun is intermountain, while the noun intermontane is an ecologic noun meaning among, between, amid, or within "flora and fauna of a montane habitat." As an example, an alpine region would be an intermontane for a species that migrates between a glacial region and a subalpine region.

== Use of the term ==
- Intermontane Basin, a wide valley between mountain ranges that is partly filled with alluvium such as New Zealand's Mackenzie Basin.
- Intermontane Belt, a physiogeological region in the North American Pacific Northwest.
- Intermontane Plateaus, the United States physiographic region of the Intermountain West.
- Intermontane Steppe, a term used mainly in reference to the Sayan Intermontane Steppe.

In palaeogeography, intermontane may refer to

- Intermontane Islands, an ancient Pacific Ocean chain of volcanic islands of the Intermontane Plate that were active during the Triassic period.
- Intermontane Plate, an ancient oceanic tectonic plate on the west coast of North America about 195 million years ago.
- Intermontane Trench, an ancient oceanic trench of the Triassic period along the west coast of North America in the former Slide Mountain Ocean.
