= Intermontane Belt =

Physiogeological region in the Pacific Northwest of North America

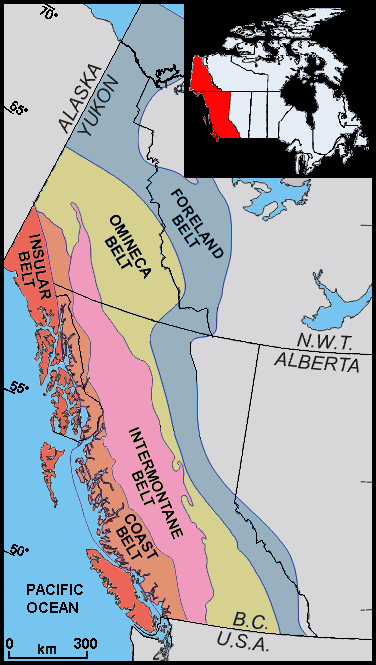
Geologic belts of far-western Canada and Southeast Alaska, including the Intermontane Belt (pink)

The Intermontane Belt is a physiogeological region in the Pacific Northwest of North America, stretching from northern Washington into British Columbia, Yukon, and Alaska. It comprises rolling hills, high plateaus and deeply cut valleys. The rocks in the belt have very little similarities with the North American continent.

== Geology ==
The formation of the Intermontane Belt is complex. It began forming during the early Jurassic period when an island arc called the Intermontane Islands collided against a pre-existing continental margin. This island arc is believed to have formed on a pre-existing tectonic plate called the Intermontane Plate about 245 million years ago by subduction of the former Insular Plate during the Triassic period. This subduction zone records another subduction zone called the Intermontane Trench under an ancient ocean between the Intermontane Islands and the former continental margin of North America called the Slide Mountain Ocean. This arrangement of two parallel subduction zones is unusual because very few twin subduction zones exist on Earth; the Philippine Mobile Belt off the eastern coast of Asia is an example of a modern twin subduction zone. As the Intermontane Plate drew closer to the pre-existing continental margin by ongoing subduction under the Slide Mountain Ocean, the Intermontane Islands drew closer to the former continental margin and coastline of western North America, supporting a pre-existing volcanic arc on the former continental margin of North America. As the North American Plate drifted west and the Intermontane Plate drifted east to the ancient continental margin of western North America, the Slide Mountain Ocean eventually closed by ongoing subduction under the Slide Mountain Ocean. The subduction zone eventually jammed and shut down completely about 180 million years ago, ending the volcanic arc on the ancient continental margin of western North America and the Intermontane Islands collided, forming the Intermontane Belt. This collision crushed and folded sedimentary and igneous rocks, creating a mountain range called the Kootenay Fold Belt which existed in far eastern Washington State and British Columbia.

After the sedimentary and igneous rocks were folded and crushed, it resulted in the creation of a new continental shelf and coastline. This coastline and continental shelf was located adjacent to the eastern margin of Methow Valley. The Insular Plate continued to subduct under the new continental shelf and coastline about 130 million years ago during the mid Cretaceous period after the formation of the Intermontane Belt, supporting a new continental volcanic arc called the Omineca Arc. Magma rising from the Omineca Arc successfully connected the Intermontane Belt to the mainland of North America, forming a chain of volcanoes from Washington to British Columbia that existed for about 60 million years. The ocean lying offshore during this period is called the Bridge River Ocean. About 115 million years ago, another island arc collided with the Pacific Northwest called the Insular Islands and caused the Bridge River Ocean to close. Like the earlier buildup of the Intermontane Islands, this island arc connected to the Intermontane Belt as magma solidified and rose beneath the arc. The compression of the collision created fractures and folds in the Intermontane Belt.

== See also ==
- Geology of British Columbia
- Insular Belt
- Interior Platform
- Volcanism of Canada
- Volcanism of Western Canada
