= Oceanic trench =

Long and narrow depressions of the sea floor

Oceanic crust is formed at an oceanic ridge, while the lithosphere is subducted back into the asthenosphere at trenches

Oceanic trenches are prominent, long, narrow topographic depressions of the ocean floor. They are typically 50 to 100 kilometers (30 to 60 mi) wide and 3 to 4 km (1.9 to 2.5 mi) below the level of the surrounding oceanic floor, but can be thousands of kilometers in length. There are about 50,000 km (31,000 mi) of oceanic trenches worldwide, mostly around the Pacific Ocean, but also in the eastern Indian Ocean and a few other locations. The greatest ocean depth measured is in the Challenger Deep of the Mariana Trench, at a depth of 10,994 m (36,070 ft) below sea level.

Oceanic trenches are a feature of the Earth's distinctive plate tectonics. They mark the locations of convergent plate boundaries, along which lithospheric plates move towards each other at rates that vary from a few millimeters to over ten centimeters per year. Oceanic lithosphere moves into trenches at a global rate of about 3 km^{2} (1.2 sq mi) per year. A trench marks the position at which the flexed, subducting slab begins to descend beneath another lithospheric slab. Trenches are generally parallel to and about 200 km (120 mi) from a volcanic arc.

Much of the fluid trapped in sediments of the subducting slab returns to the surface at the oceanic trench, producing mud volcanoes and cold seeps. These support unique biomes based on chemotrophic microorganisms. There is concern that plastic debris is accumulating in trenches and threatening these communities.

== Geographic distribution ==
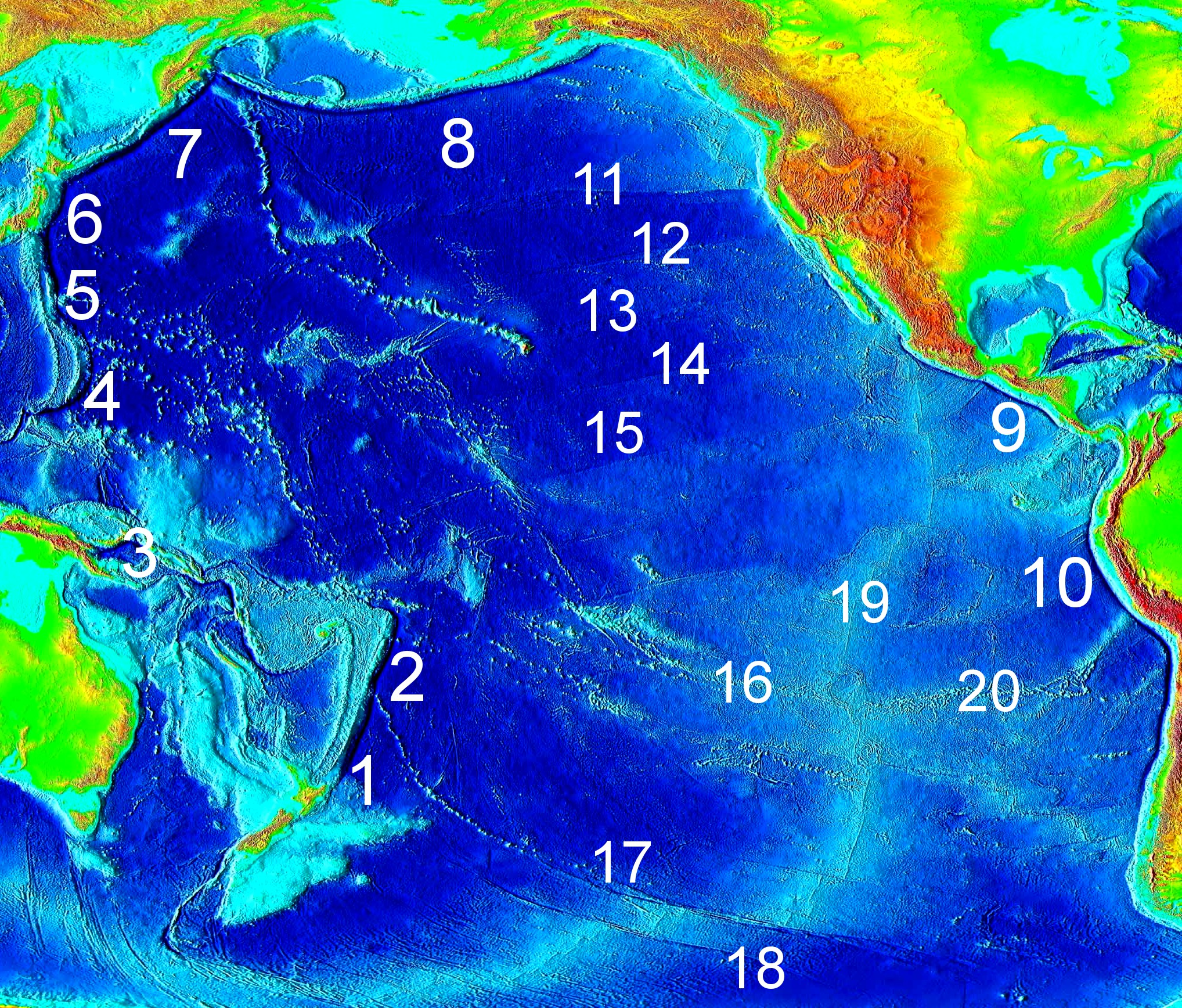
Major Pacific trenches (1–10) and fracture zones (11–20): 1. Kermadec 2. Tonga 3. Bougainville 4. Mariana 5. Izu–Ogasawara 6. Japan 7. Kuril–Kamchatka 8. Aleutian 9. Middle America 10. Peru–Chile 11. Mendocino 12. Murray 13. Molokai 14. Clarion 15. Clipperton 16. Challenger 17. Eltanin 18. Udintsev 19. East Pacific Rise (S-shaped) 20. Nazca Ridge

There are approximately 50,000 km (31,000 mi) of convergent plate margins worldwide. These are mostly located around the Pacific Ocean, but are also found in the eastern Indian Ocean, with a few shorter convergent margin segments in other parts of the Indian Ocean, in the Atlantic Ocean, and in the Mediterranean. They are found on the oceanward side of island arcs and Andean-type orogens. Globally, there are over 50 major ocean trenches covering an area of 1.9 million km^{2} or about 0.5% of the oceans.

Trenches are geomorphologically distinct from troughs. Troughs are elongated depressions of the sea floor with steep sides and flat bottoms, while trenches are characterized by a V-shaped profile. Trenches that are partially infilled are sometimes described as troughs, for example the Makran Trough. Some trenches are completely buried and lack bathymetric expression as in the Cascadia subduction zone, which is completely filled with sediments. Despite their appearance, in these instances the fundamental plate-tectonic structure is still an oceanic trench. Some troughs look similar to oceanic trenches but possess other tectonic structures. One example is the Lesser Antilles Trough, which is the forearc basin of the Lesser Antilles subduction zone. Also not a trench is the New Caledonia trough, which is an extensional sedimentary basin related to the Tonga-Kermadec subduction zone. Additionally, the Cayman Trough, which is a pull-apart basin within a transform fault zone, is not an oceanic trench.

Trenches, along with volcanic arcs and Wadati–Benioff zones (zones of earthquakes under a volcanic arc) are diagnostic of convergent plate boundaries and their deeper manifestations, subduction zones. Here, two tectonic plates are drifting into each other at a rate of a few millimeters to over 10 centimeters (4 in) per year. At least one of the plates is oceanic lithosphere, which plunges under the other plate to be recycled in the Earth's mantle.

Trenches are related to, but distinct from, continental collision zones, such as the Himalayas. Unlike in trenches, in continental collision zones continental crust enters a subduction zone. When buoyant continental crust enters a trench, subduction comes to a halt and the area becomes a zone of continental collision. Features analogous to trenches are associated with collision zones. One such feature is the peripheral foreland basin, a sediment-filled foredeep. Examples of peripheral foreland basins include the floodplains of the Ganges River and the Tigris-Euphrates river system.

== History of the term "trench" ==
Trenches were not clearly defined until the late 1940s and 1950s. The bathymetry of the ocean was poorly known prior to the Challenger expedition of 1872–1876, which took 492 soundings of the deep ocean. At station No. 225, the expedition discovered Challenger Deep, now known to be the southern end of the Mariana Trench. The laying of transatlantic telegraph cables on the seafloor between the continents during the late 19th and early 20th centuries provided further motivation for improved bathymetry. The term trench, in its modern sense of a prominent elongated depression of the sea bottom, was first used by Johnstone in his 1923 textbook An Introduction to Oceanography.

During the 1920s and 1930s, Felix Andries Vening Meinesz measured gravity over trenches using a newly developed gravimeter that could measure gravity from aboard a submarine. He proposed the tectogene hypothesis to explain the belts of negative gravity anomalies that were found near island arcs. According to this hypothesis, the belts were zones of downwelling of light crustal rock arising from subcrustal convection currents. The tectogene hypothesis was further developed by Griggs in 1939, using an analogue model based on a pair of rotating drums. Harry Hammond Hess substantially revised the theory based on his geological analysis.

World War II in the Pacific led to great improvements of bathymetry, particularly in the western Pacific. In light of these new measurements, the linear nature of the deeps became clear. There was a rapid growth of deep sea research efforts, especially the widespread use of echosounders in the 1950s and 1960s. These efforts confirmed the morphological utility of the term "trench." Important trenches were identified, sampled, and mapped via sonar.

The early phase of trench exploration reached its peak with the 1960 descent of the Bathyscaphe Trieste to the bottom of the Challenger Deep. Following Robert S. Dietz' and Harry Hess' promulgation of the seafloor spreading hypothesis in the early 1960s and the plate tectonic revolution in the late 1960s, the oceanic trench became an important concept in plate tectonic theory.

== Morphology ==
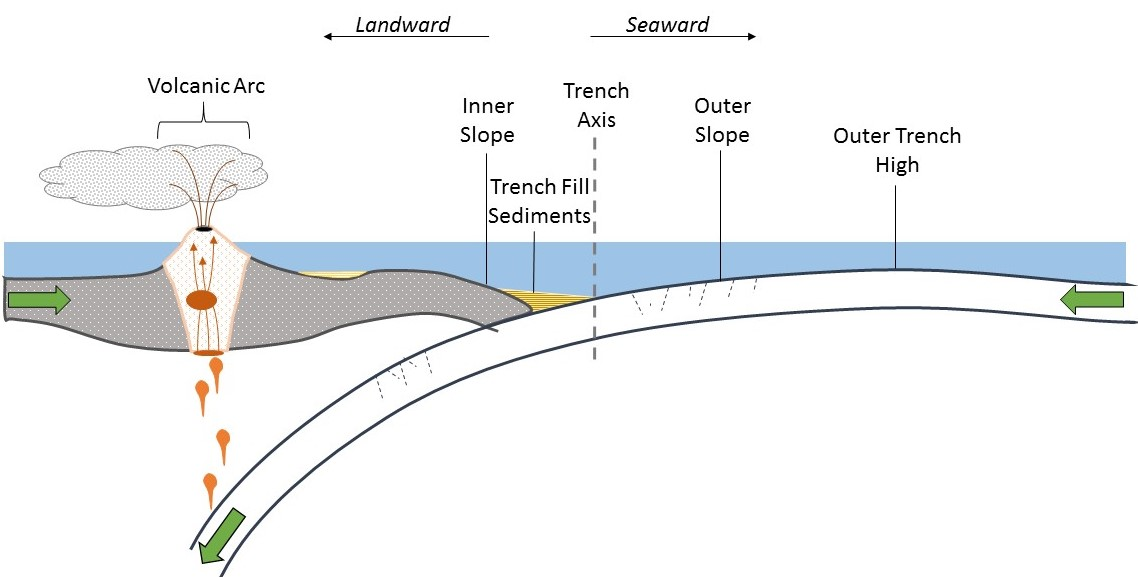
Cross section of an oceanic trench formed along an oceanic-oceanic convergent boundary

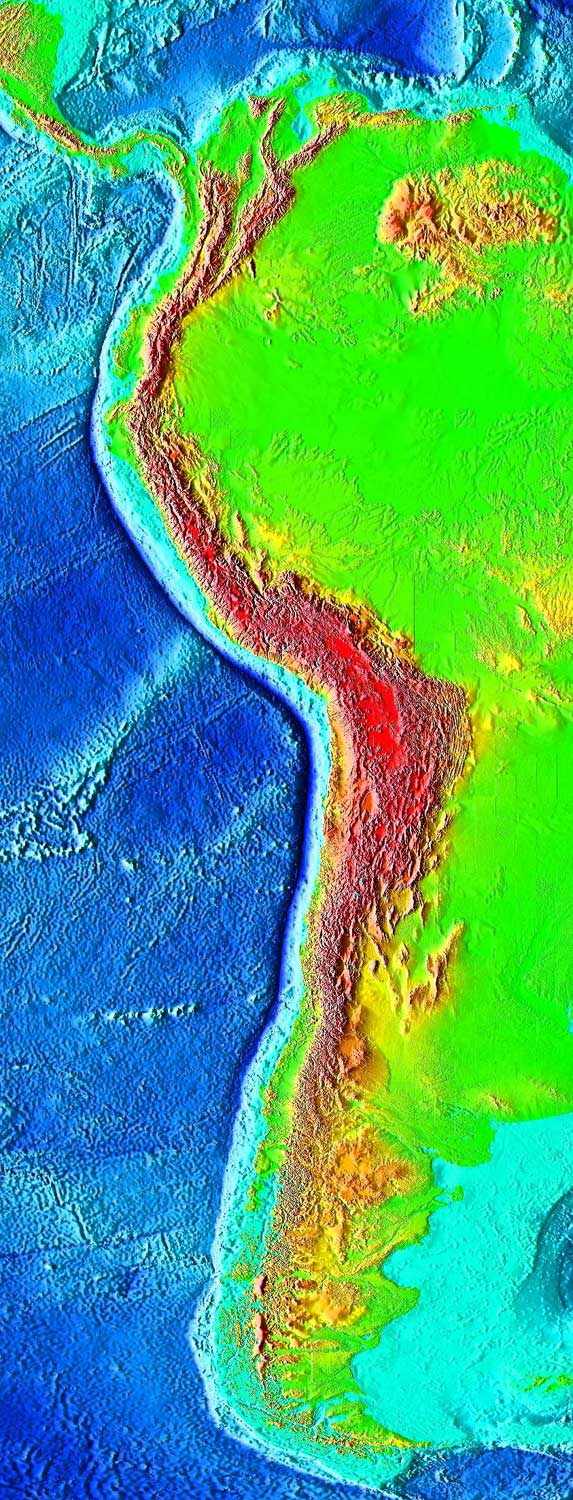
The Peru–Chile Trench is located just left of the sharp line between the blue deep ocean (on the left) and the light blue continental shelf, along the west coast of South America. It runs along an oceanic-continental boundary, where the oceanic Nazca plate subducts beneath the continental South American plate

Oceanic trenches are 50 to 100 kilometers (30 to 60 mi) wide and have an asymmetric V-shape, with the steeper slope (8 to 20 degrees) on the inner (overriding) side of the trench and the gentler slope (around 5 degrees) on the outer (subducting) side of the trench. The bottom of the trench marks the boundary between the subducting and overriding plates, known as the basal plate boundary shear or the subduction décollement. The depth of the trench depends on the starting depth of the oceanic lithosphere as it begins its plunge into the trench, the angle at which the slab plunges, and the amount of sedimentation in the trench. Both starting depth and subduction angle are greater for older oceanic lithosphere, which is reflected in the deep trenches of the western Pacific. Here the bottoms of the Marianas and the Tonga–Kermadec trenches are up to 10–11 kilometers (6.2–6.8 mi) below sea level. In the eastern Pacific, where the subducting oceanic lithosphere is much younger, the depth of the Peru-Chile trench is around 7 to 8 kilometers (4.3 to 5.0 mi).

Though narrow, oceanic trenches are remarkably long and continuous, forming the largest linear depressions on earth. An individual trench can be thousands of kilometers long. Most trenches are convex towards the subducting slab, which is attributed to the spherical geometry of the Earth.

The trench asymmetry reflects the different physical mechanisms that determine the inner and outer slope angle. The outer slope angle of the trench is determined by the bending radius of the subducting slab, as determined by its elastic thickness. Since oceanic lithosphere thickens with age, the outer slope angle is ultimately determined by the age of the subducting slab. The inner slope angle is determined by the angle of repose of the overriding plate edge. This reflects frequent earthquakes along the trench that prevent oversteepening of the inner slope.

As the subducting plate approaches the trench, it bends slightly upwards before beginning its plunge into the depths. As a result, the outer trench slope is bounded by an outer trench high. This is subtle, often only tens of meters high, and is typically located a few tens of kilometers from the trench axis. On the outer slope itself, where the plate begins to bend downward into the trench, the upper part of the subducting slab is broken by bending faults that give the outer trench slope a horst and graben topography. The formation of these bending faults is suppressed where oceanic ridges or large seamounts are subducting into the trench, but the bending faults cut right across smaller seamounts. Where the subducting slab is only thinly veneered with sediments, the outer slope will often show seafloor spreading ridges oblique to the horst and graben ridges.

=== Sedimentation ===
Trench morphology is strongly modified by the amount of sedimentation in the trench. This varies from practically no sedimentation, as in the Tonga-Kermadec trench, to completely filled with sediments, as with the Cascadia subduction zone. Sedimentation is largely controlled by whether the trench is near a continental sediment source. The range of sedimentation is well illustrated by the Chilean trench. The north Chile portion of the trench, which lies along the Atacama Desert with its very slow rate of weathering, is sediment-starved, with from 20 to a few hundred meters of sediments on the trench floor. The tectonic morphology of this trench segment is fully exposed on the ocean bottom. The central Chile segment of the trench is moderately sedimented, with sediments onlapping onto pelagic sediments or ocean basement of the subducting slab, but the trench morphology is still clearly discernible. The southern Chile segment of the trench is fully sedimented, to the point where the outer rise and slope are no longer discernible. Other fully sedimented trenches include the Makran Trough, where sediments are up to 7.5 kilometers (4.7 mi) thick; the Cascadia subduction zone, which is completed buried by 3 to 4 kilometers (1.9 to 2.5 mi) of sediments; and the northernmost Sumatra subduction zone, which is buried under 6 kilometers (3.7 mi) of sediments.

Sediments are sometimes transported along the axis of an oceanic trench. The central Chile trench experiences transport of sediments from source fans along an axial channel. Similar transport of sediments has been documented in the Aleutian trench.

In addition to sedimentation from rivers draining into a trench, sedimentation also takes place from landslides on the tectonically steepened inner slope, often driven by megathrust earthquakes. The Reloca Slide of the central Chile trench is an example of this process.

=== Erosive versus accretionary margins ===
Convergent margins are classified as erosive or accretionary, and this has a strong influence on the morphology of the inner slope of the trench. Erosive margins, such as the northern Peru-Chile, Tonga-Kermadec, and Mariana trenches, correspond to sediment-starved trenches. The subducting slab erodes material from the lower part of the overriding slab, reducing its volume. The edge of the slab experiences subsidence and steepening, with normal faulting. The slope is underlain by relative strong igneous and metamorphic rock, which maintains a high angle of repose. Over half of all convergent margins are erosive margins.

Accretionary margins, such as the southern Peru-Chile, Cascadia, and Aleutians, are associated with moderately to heavily sedimented trenches. As the slab subducts, sediments are "bulldozed" onto the edge of the overriding plate, producing an accretionary wedge or accretionary prism. This builds the overriding plate outwards. Because the sediments lack strength, their angle of repose is gentler than the rock making up the inner slope of erosive margin trenches. The inner slope is underlain by imbricated thrust sheets of sediments. The inner slope topography is roughened by localized mass wasting. Cascadia has practically no bathymetric expression of the outer rise and trench, due to complete sediment filling, but the inner trench slope is complex, with many thrust ridges. These compete with canyon formation by rivers draining into the trench. Inner trench slopes of erosive margins rarely show thrust ridges.

Accretionary prisms grow in two ways. The first is by frontal accretion, in which sediments are scraped off the downgoing plate and emplaced at the front of the accretionary prism. As the accretionary wedge grows, older sediments further from the trench become increasingly lithified, and faults and other structural features are steepened by rotation towards the trench. The other mechanism for accretionary prism growth is underplating (also known as basal accretion) of subducted sediments, together with some oceanic crust, along the shallow parts of the subduction decollement. The Franciscan Group of California is interpreted as an ancient accretionary prism in which underplating is recorded as tectonic mélanges and duplex structures.

Oceanic trench formed along an oceanic-oceanic convergent boundary

The Mariana Trench contains the deepest part of the world's oceans, and runs along an oceanic-oceanic convergent boundary. It is the result of the oceanic Pacific plate subducting beneath the oceanic Mariana plate.

=== Earthquakes ===
Frequent megathrust earthquakes modify the inner slope of the trench by triggering massive landslides. These leave semicircular landslide scarps with slopes of up to 20 degrees on the headwalls and sidewalls.

Subduction of seamounts and aseismic ridges into the trench may increase aseismic creep and reduce the severity of earthquakes. Contrariwise, subduction of large amounts of sediments may allow ruptures along the subduction décollement to propagate for great distances to produce megathrust earthquakes.

== Slab rollback ==
Trenches seem positionally stable over time, but scientists believe that some trenches—particularly those associated with subduction zones where two oceanic plates converge—move backward into the subducting plate. This is called slab rollback or retreat, hinge rollback or retreat, trench rollback or retreat and is one explanation for the existence of back-arc basins.

Forces perpendicular to the slab (the portion of the subducting plate within the mantle) are responsible for steepening of the slab and, ultimately, the movement of the hinge and trench at the surface. These forces arise from the negative buoyancy of the slab with respect to the mantle modified by the geometry of the slab itself. The extension in the overriding plate, in response to the subsequent subhorizontal mantle flow from the displacement of the slab, can result in formation of a back-arc basin.

=== Processes involved ===
Several forces are involved in the process of slab rollback. Two forces acting against each other at the interface of the two subducting plates exert forces against one another. The subducting plate exerts a bending force (FPB) that supplies pressure during subduction, while the overriding plate exerts a force against the subducting plate (FTS). The slab pull force (FSP) is caused by the negative buoyancy of the plate driving the plate to greater depths. The resisting force from the surrounding mantle opposes the slab pull forces. Interactions with the 660-km discontinuity cause a deflection due to the buoyancy at the phase transition (F660). The unique interplay of these forces is what generates slab rollback. When the deep slab section obstructs the down-going motion of the shallow slab section, slab rollback occurs. The subducting slab undergoes backward sinking due to the negative buoyancy forces causing a retrogradation of the trench hinge along the surface. Upwelling of the mantle around the slab can create favorable conditions for the formation of a back-arc basin.

Seismic tomography provides evidence for slab rollback. Results demonstrate high temperature anomalies within the mantle suggesting subducted material is present in the mantle. Ophiolites are viewed as evidence for such mechanisms as high pressure and temperature rocks are rapidly brought to the surface through the processes of slab rollback, which provides space for the exhumation of ophiolites.

Slab rollback is not always a continuous process suggesting an episodic nature. The episodic nature of the rollback is explained by a change in the density of the subducting plate, such as the arrival of buoyant lithosphere (a continent, arc, ridge, or plateau), a change in the subduction dynamics, or a change in the plate kinematics. The age of the subducting plates does not have any effect on slab rollback. Nearby continental collisions have an effect on slab rollback. Continental collisions induce mantle flow and extrusion of mantle material, which causes stretching and arc-trench rollback. In the area of the Southeast Pacific, there have been several rollback events resulting in the formation of numerous back-arc basins.

=== Mantle interactions ===
Interactions with the mantle discontinuities play a significant role in slab rollback. Stagnation at the 660-km discontinuity causes retrograde slab motion due to the suction forces acting at the surface. Slab rollback induces mantle return flow, which causes extension from the shear stresses at the base of the overriding plate. As slab rollback velocities increase, circular mantle flow velocities also increase, accelerating extension rates. Extension rates are altered when the slab interacts with the discontinuities within the mantle at 410 km and 660 km depth. Slabs can either penetrate directly into the lower mantle, or can be retarded due to the phase transition at 660 km depth creating a difference in buoyancy. An increase in retrograde trench migration (slab rollback) (2–4 cm/yr) is a result of flattened slabs at the 660-km discontinuity where the slab does not penetrate into the lower mantle. This is the case for the Japan, Java and Izu–Bonin trenches. These flattened slabs are only temporarily arrested in the transition zone. The subsequent displacement into the lower mantle is caused by slab pull forces, or the destabilization of the slab from warming and broadening due to thermal diffusion. Slabs that penetrate directly into the lower mantle result in slower slab rollback rates (~1–3 cm/yr) such as the Mariana arc, Tonga arcs.

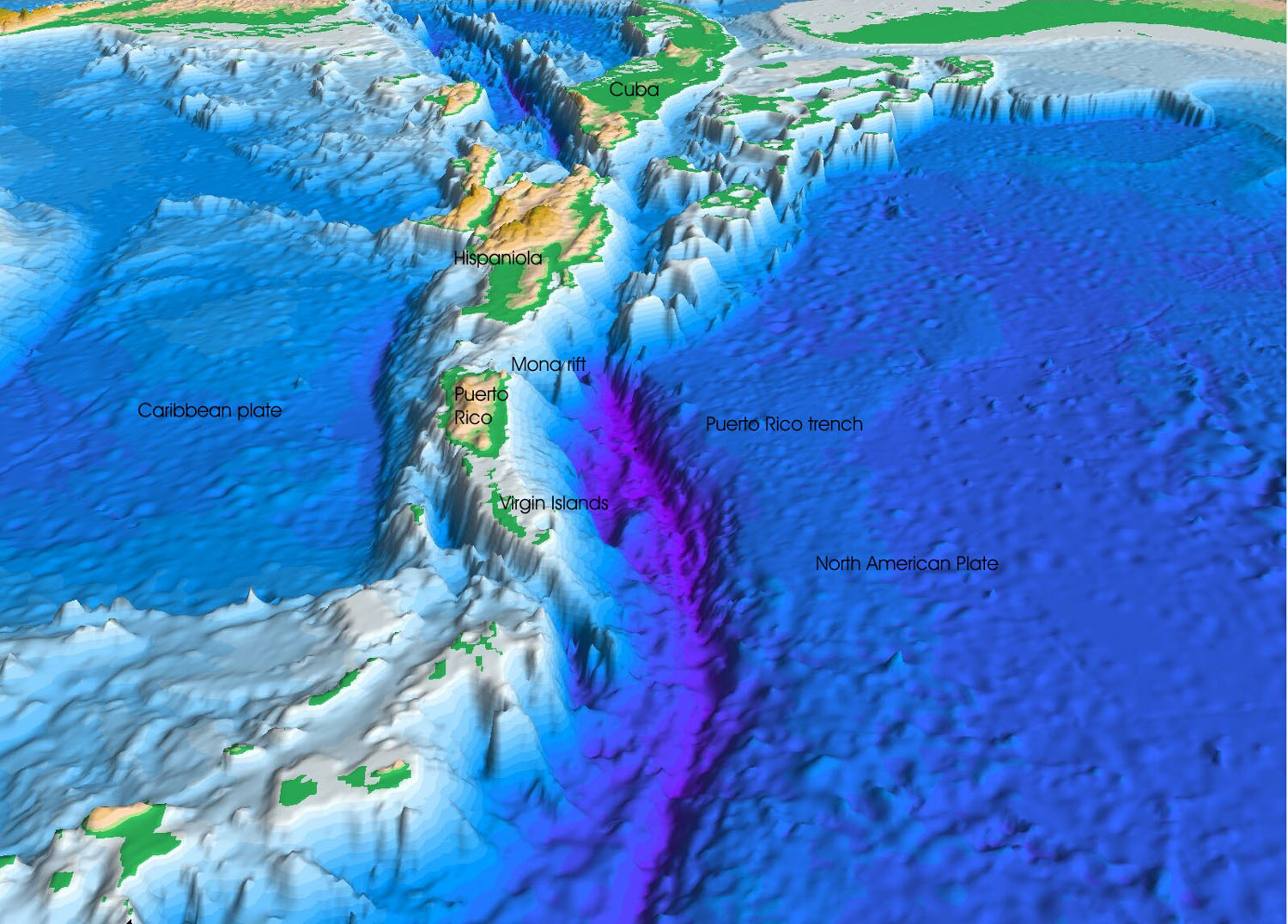
The Puerto Rico Trench

== Hydrothermal activity and associated biomes ==
As sediments are subducted at the bottom of trenches, much of their fluid content is expelled and moves back along the subduction décollement to emerge on the inner slope as mud volcanoes and cold seeps. Methane clathrates and gas hydrates also accumulate in the inner slope, and there is concern that their breakdown could contribute to global warming.

The fluids released at mud volcanoes and cold seeps are rich in methane and hydrogen sulfide, providing chemical energy for chemotrophic microorganisms that form the base of a unique trench biome. Cold seep communities have been identified in the inner trench slopes of the western Pacific (especially Japan), South America, Barbados, the Mediterranean, Makran, and the Sunda trench. These are found at depths as great as 6,000 meters (20,000 ft). The genome of the extremophile Deinococcus from Challenger Deep has sequenced for its ecological insights and potential industrial uses.

Because trenches are the lowest points in the ocean floor, there is concern that plastic debris may accumulate in trenches and endanger the fragile trench biomes.

== Deepest oceanic trenches ==
Recent measurements, where the salinity and temperature of the water was measured throughout the dive, have uncertainties of about 15 m (49 ft). Older measurements may be off by hundreds of meters.

Trench	Ocean	Lowest Point	Maximum Depth	Source
Mariana Trench	Pacific Ocean	Challenger Deep	10,925 m (35,843 ft)	
Tonga Trench	Pacific Ocean	Horizon Deep	10,820 m (35,500 ft)	
Philippine Trench	Pacific Ocean	Emden Deep	10,540 m (34,580 ft)	
Kermadec Trench	Pacific Ocean		10,047 m (32,963 ft)	
Izu–Bonin Trench (Izu–Ogasawara Trench)	Pacific Ocean		9,810 m (32,190 ft)	
Kuril–Kamchatka Trench	Pacific Ocean		9,604 m (31,509 ft)	
New Britain Trench	Pacific Ocean (Solomon Sea)	Planet Deep	9,140 m (29,990 ft)	
Puerto Rico Trench	Atlantic Ocean	Milwaukee Deep	8,376 m (27,480 ft)	
South Sandwich Trench	Atlantic Ocean	Meteor Deep	8,266 m (27,119 ft)	
Peru–Chile Trench or Atacama Trench	Pacific Ocean	Richards Deep	8,055 m (26,427 ft)	
Japan Trench	Pacific Ocean		8,412 m (27,498 ft)	
Cayman Trench	Atlantic Ocean	Caribbean Deep	7,686 m (25,217 ft)	
South Sandwich Trench	Southern Ocean	Factorian Deep	7,334 m (24,062 ft)	
Sunda Trench	Indian Ocean	Java Deep	7,192 m (23,596 ft)	
Mauritius Trench	Indian Ocean	Mauritius Point	6,875 m (22,556 ft)	
India Trench	Indian Ocean	Between India & Maldives	7,225 m (23,704 ft)	
Ceylon Trench	Indian Ocean	Sri Lanka Deep	6,400 m (21,000 ft)	
Somalia Trench	Indian Ocean	Somali Deep	6,084 m (19,961 ft)	
Madagascar Trench	Indian Ocean	Madagascar Deep	6,048 m (19,843 ft)	
Puerto Rico Trench	Atlantic Ocean	Rio Bermuda Deep	5,625 m (18,455 ft)	
Mid-Atlantic Ridge	Arctic Ocean	Molloy Deep	5,550 m (18,210 ft)	

== Notable oceanic trenches ==
Trench	Location
Aleutian Trench	South of the Aleutian Islands, west of Alaska
Bougainville Trench	South of New Guinea
Cayman Trench	Western Caribbean
Cedros Trench (inactive)	Pacific coast of Baja California
Hikurangi Trough	East of New Zealand
Hjort Trench	Southwest of New Zealand
Izu–Ogasawara Trench	Near Izu and Bonin islands
Japan Trench	East of Japan
Kermadec Trench *	Northeast of New Zealand
Kuril–Kamchatka Trench *	Near Kuril Islands
Manila Trench	West of Luzon, Philippines
Mariana Trench *	Western Pacific Ocean; east of Mariana Islands
Middle America Trench	Eastern Pacific Ocean; off coast of Mexico, Guatemala, El Salvador, Nicaragua, Costa Rica
New Hebrides Trench	West of Vanuatu (New Hebrides Islands).
Peru–Chile Trench	Eastern Pacific Ocean; off coast of Peru & Chile
Philippine Trench *	East of the Philippines
Puerto Rico Trench	Boundary of Caribbean and Atlantic Ocean
Puysegur trench	Southwest of New Zealand
Ryukyu Trench	Eastern edge of Japan's Ryukyu Islands
South Sandwich Trench	East of the South Sandwich Islands
Sunda Trench	Curves from south of Java to west of Sumatra and the Andaman and Nicobar Islands
Tonga Trench *	Near Tonga
Yap Trench	Western Pacific Ocean; between Palau Islands and Mariana Trench

(*) The five deepest trenches in the world

== Ancient oceanic trenches ==
Trench	Location
Intermontane Trench	Western North America; between the Intermontane Islands and North America
Insular Trench	Western North America; between the Insular Islands and the Intermontane Islands
Farallon Trench	Western North America
Tethys Trench	South of Turkey, Iran, Tibet and Southeast Asia

== See also ==
- Glossary of landforms
- List of submarine topographical features
- Mid-ocean ridge
- Physical oceanography
- Ring of Fire

== Bibliography ==
- Allwrardt, Allan O. (1993). "Evolution of the tectogene concept, 1930–1965" (PDF). Proceedings of the Fifth International Congress on the History of Oceanography.
- Amos, Jonathan (11 May 2021). "Oceans' extreme depths measured in precise detail". News. BBC.
- Bangs, N. L.; Morgan, J. K.; Tréhu, A. M.; Contreras-Reyes, E.; Arnulf, A. F.; Han, S.; Olsen, K. M.; Zhang, E. (November 2020). "Basal Accretion Along the South Central Chilean Margin and Its Relationship to Great Earthquakes". Journal of Geophysical Research: Solid Earth. 125 (11). Bibcode:2020JGRB..12519861B. doi:10.1029/2020JB019861. S2CID 225154312.
- Bodine, J.H.; Watts, A.B (1979). "On lithospheric flexure seaward of the Bonin and Mariana trenches". Earth and Planetary Science Letters. 43 (1): 132–148. Bibcode:1979E&PSL..43..132B. doi:10.1016/0012-821X(79)90162-6.
- Christensen, UR (1996). "The Influence of Trench Migration on Slab Penetration into the Lower Mantle". Earth and Planetary Science Letters. 140 (1–4): 27–39. Bibcode:1996E&PSL.140...27C. doi:10.1016/0012-821x(96)00023-4.
- Dastanpour, Mohammad (March 1996). "The Devonian System in Iran: a review". Geological Magazine. 133 (2): 159–170. Bibcode:1996GeoM..133..159D. doi:10.1017/S0016756800008670. S2CID 129199671.
- Dreutter, Simon; Steffen, Melanie; Arbizu, Pedro Martínez; Brandt, Angelika (2020). "Will the "top five" deepest trenches lose one of their members?". Progress in Oceanography. 181 102258. doi:10.1016/j.pocean.2019.102258.
- Dvorkin, Jack; Nur, Amos; Mavko, Gary; Ben-Avraham, Zvi (1993). "Narrow subducting slabs and the origin of backarc basins". Tectonophysics. 227 (1–4): 63–79. Bibcode:1993Tectp.227...63D. doi:10.1016/0040-1951(93)90087-Z.
- Einsele, Gerhard (2000). Sedimentary Basins: Evolution, Facies, and Sediment Budget (2nd ed.). Springer. p. 630. ISBN 978-3-540-66193-1.
- Eiseley, Loren (1946). "The Great Deeps". The Immense Journey (1959 ed.). United States: Vintage Books. p. 38–41. ISBN 0-394-70157-7.
- Fujikura, K.; Lindsay, D.; Kitazato, H.; Nishida, S.; Shirayama, Y. (2010). "Marine Biodiversity in Japanese Waters". PLOS One. 5 (8) e11836. Bibcode:2010PLoSO...511836F. doi:10.1371/journal.pone.0011836. PMC 2914005. PMID 20689840.
- "Deep-sea trench". McGraw-Hill Encyclopedia of Science & Technology (8th ed.). 1997.
- Flower, MFJ; Dilek, Y (2003). "Arc–trench Rollback and Forearc Accretion: 1. A Collision–Induced Mantle Flow Model for Tethyan Ophiolites". Pub. Geol. Soc. Lond. 218 (1): 21–41. Bibcode:2003GSLSP.218...21F. doi:10.1144/gsl.sp.2003.218.01.03. S2CID 128899276.
- Gallo, N.D.; Cameron, J; Hardy, K.; Fryer, P.; Bartlett, D.H.; Levin, L.A. (2015). "Submersible- and lander-observed community patterns in the Mariana and New Britain trenches: Influence of productivity and depth on epibenthic and scavenging communities". Deep Sea Research Part I: Oceanographic Research Papers. 99: 119–133. Bibcode:2015DSRI...99..119G. doi:10.1016/j.dsr.2014.12.012.
- Garfunkel, Z; Anderson, C. A.; Schubert, G (10 June 1986). "Mantle circulation and the lateral migration of subducted slabs". Journal of Geophysical Research: Solid Earth. 91 (B7): 7205–7223. Bibcode:1986JGR....91.7205G. doi:10.1029/JB091iB07p07205.
- Geersen, Jacob; Voelker, David; Behrmann, Jan H. (2018). "Oceanic Trenches". Submarine Geomorphology. Springer Geology. pp. 409–424. doi:10.1007/978-3-319-57852-1_21. ISBN 978-3-319-57851-4.
- Goldfinger, Chris; Nelson, C. Hans; Morey, Ann E.; Johnson, Joel E.; Patton, Jason R.; Karabanov, Eugene B.; Gutierrez-Pastor, Julia; Eriksson, Andrew T.; Gracia, Eulalia; Dunhill, Gita; Enkin, Randolph J.; Dallimore, Audrey; Vallier, Tracy (2012). Kayen, Robert (ed.). "Turbidite event history—Methods and implications for Holocene paleoseismicity of the Cascadia subduction zone". U.S. Geological Survey Professional Paper. Professional Paper. 1661-E: 4. Bibcode:2012usgs.rept....4G. doi:10.3133/pp1661F.
- Hackney, Ron; Sutherland, Rupert; Collot, Julien (June 2012). "Rifting and subduction initiation history of the New Caledonia Trough, southwest Pacific, constrained by process-oriented gravity models: Gravity modelling of the New Caledonia Trough". Geophysical Journal International. 189 (3): 1293–1305. doi:10.1111/j.1365-246X.2012.05441.x.
- Hall, R; Spakman, W (2002). "Subducted Slabs Beneath the Eastern Indonesia–Tonga Region: Insights from Tomography". Earth and Planetary Science Letters. 201 (2): 321–336. Bibcode:2002E&PSL.201..321H. CiteSeerX 10.1.1.511.9094. doi:10.1016/s0012-821x(02)00705-7. S2CID 129884170.
- Harris, P.T.; MacMillan-Lawler, M.; Rupp, J.; Baker, E.K. (2014). "Geomorphology of the oceans". Marine Geology. 352: 4–24. Bibcode:2014MGeol.352....4H. doi:10.1016/j.margeo.2014.01.011.
- Jamieson, A.J.; Fujii, T.; Mayor, D.J.; Solan', M.; Priede, I.G. (2010). "Hadal trenches: the ecology of the deepest places on Earth". Trends in Ecology & Evolution. 25 (3): 190–197. Bibcode:2010TEcoE..25..190J. doi:10.1016/j.tree.2009.09.009. PMID 19846236.
- Johnstone, James (1923). An Introduction to Oceanography, With Special Reference to Geography and Geophysics. Creative Media Partners, LLC. ISBN 978-1-340-39958-0.
- Kearey, P.; Klepeis, K.A.; Vine, F.J. (2009). Global tectonics (3rd ed.). Oxford: Wiley-Blackwell. pp. 184–188. ISBN 978-1-4051-0777-8.
- McConnell, A. (1990). "The art of submarine cable- laying: its contribution to physical oceanography". Deutsche hydrographische Zeitschrift, Erganzungs-heft, B. 22: 467–473.
- Nakakuki, T; Mura, E (2013). "Dynamics of Slab Rollback and Induced Back-Arc Basin Formation". Earth and Planetary Science Letters. 361 (B11): 287–297. Bibcode:2013E&PSL.361..287N. doi:10.1016/j.epsl.2012.10.031.
- Peng, Guyu; Bellerby, Richard; Zhang, Feng; Sun, Xuerong; Li, Daoji (January 2020). "The ocean's ultimate trashcan: Hadal trenches as major depositories for plastic pollution". Water Research. 168 115121. Bibcode:2020WatRe.16815121P. doi:10.1016/j.watres.2019.115121. hdl:11250/2677323. PMID 31605833. S2CID 204122125.
- Rowley, David B. (2002). "Rate of plate creation and destruction: 180 Ma to present". Geological Society of America Bulletin. 114 (8): 927–933. Bibcode:2002GSAB..114..927R. doi:10.1130/0016-7606(2002)114<0927:ROPCAD>2.0.CO;2.
- Schellart, WP; Lister, GS; Toy, VG (2006). "A Late Cretaceous and Cenozoic Reconstruction of the Southwest Pacific Region: Tectonics Controlled by Subduction and Slab Rollback Processes". Earth-Science Reviews. 76 (3–4): 191–233. Bibcode:2006ESRv...76..191S. doi:10.1016/j.earscirev.2006.01.002.
- Schellart, WP; Moresi, L (2013). "A New Driving Mechanism for Backarc Extension and Backarc Shortening Through Slab Sinking Induced Toroidal and Poloidal Mantle Flow: Results from dynamic subduction models with an overriding plate". Journal of Geophysical Research. 118 (6): 3221–3248. Bibcode:2013JGRB..118.3221S. doi:10.1002/jgrb.50173.
- Stern, R.J. (2005). "TECTONICS | Ocean Trenches". Encyclopedia of Geology. pp. 428–437. doi:10.1016/B0-12-369396-9/00141-6. ISBN 978-0-12-369396-9.
- Thomas, C.; Burbidge, D.; Cummins, P. (2007). A preliminary study into the tsunami hazard faced by southwest Pacific nations. Risk and Impact Analysis Group, Geoscience Australia.
- Thomson, C.W.; Murray, J. (1895). "Report on the scientific results of the voyage of H.M.S. Challenger during the years of 1872–76 (page 877)". 19thcenturyscience.org. Archived from the original on 17 April 2012.
- Völker, David; Geersen, Jacob; Contreras-Reyes, Eduardo; Sellanes, Javier; Pantoja, Silvio; Rabbel, Wolfgang; Thorwart, Martin; Reichert, Christian; Block, Martin; Weinrebe, Wilhelm Reimer (October 2014). "Morphology and geology of the continental shelf and upper slope of southern Central Chile (33°S–43°S)" (PDF). International Journal of Earth Sciences. 103 (7): 1765–1787. Bibcode:2014IJEaS.103.1765V. doi:10.1007/s00531-012-0795-y. S2CID 129460412.
- Völker, D.; Weinrebe, W.; Behrmann, J. H.; Bialas, J.; Klaeschen, D. (2009). "Mass wasting at the base of the south central Chilean continental margin: The Reloca Slide". Advances in Geosciences. 22: 155–167. Bibcode:2009AdG....22..155V. doi:10.5194/adgeo-22-155-2009.
- Völker, David; Geersen, Jacob; Contreras-Reyes, Eduardo; Reichert, Christian (2013). "Sedimentary fill of the Chile Trench (32–46°S): Volumetric distribution and causal factors". Journal of the Geological Society. 170 (5): 723–736. Bibcode:2013JGSoc.170..723V. doi:10.1144/jgs2012-119. S2CID 128432525.
- Weyl, Peter K. (1969). Oceanography: an introduction to the marine environment. New York: Wiley. ISBN 978-0-471-93744-9.
- Westbrook, G.K.; Mascle, A.; Biju-Duval, B. (1984). "Geophysics and the structure of the Lesser Antilles forearc" (PDF). Initial Reports of the Deep Sea Drilling Project. 78: 23–38.
- Zhang, Ru-Yi; Huang, Ying; Qin, Wen-Jing; Quan, Zhe-Xue (June 2021). "The complete genome of extracellular protease-producing Deinococcus sp. D7000 isolated from the hadal region of Mariana Trench Challenger Deep". Marine Genomics. 57 100832. Bibcode:2021MarGn..5700832Z. doi:10.1016/j.margen.2020.100832. PMID 33867118. S2CID 229392459.
