= Geology of British Columbia =

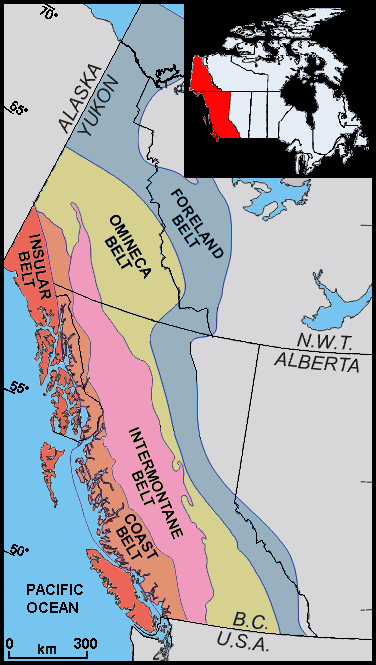
Geologic belts of Western Canada

The geology of British Columbia is a function of its location on the leading edge of the North American continent. The mountainous physiography and the diversity of the different types and ages of rock hint at the complex geology, which is still undergoing revision despite a century of exploration and mapping.

The province's most prominent geological features are its mountain ranges, including the North American Cordillera which stretches from Southern Mexico to Alaska.

== Terrane theory ==
Terrane theory was first proposed by Jim Monger of the Geological Survey of Canada and Charlie Rouse in 1971 as an explanation for a set of fusulinid fossils that were found in central British Columbia. Rather than suggest that facies changes or seaways were behind this (which were common explanations at the time), the two geologists proposed that the fossils in question had been part of an assemblage of rocks that had migrated across the Pacific Ocean to their present location. This theory was then developed by Porter Irwin and Davy Jones of the US Geological Survey to its common definition of "fault-bounded regional geologic entities, each characterized by a different geologic history than its neighbours.".

Terranes are most commonly associated with different tectonic elements such as island arcs, volcanic plateaus, subduction zones, continental margins, mid-oceanic ridges, and continental fragments. These terranes are gradually joined together by elements such as overlap formations and stitching plutons and are then accreted to the continent. In some cases, a terrane can contain multiple tectonic elements. The Cache Creek terrane is composed of a massive carbonate component, an oceanic floor component, and a subduction mélange component.

== Architecture and composition ==
There are five morphogeological belts that define the geology of British Columbia from east to west: the Foreland, Omineca, Intermontane, Coast, and Insular belts. Each has a unique geology, including different metamorphic, physiographic, metallogenic, and tectonic histories.

The Foreland Belt is composed of weakly metamorphosed sedimentary rocks which are 1.4 billion to 33 million years old, and the belt represents a rift sequence followed by a passive margin that was turned into a retro arc fold and thrust belt with synorogenic sedimentation. The region is very rugged except in the northeast of the province where the earth flattens out to an expansive plain.

The Omineca Belt is composed of highly metamorphosed, pericratonic (near craton) terranes and fragments of North America that are 2 billion to 180 million years old. Terranes in the belt include the Slide Mountain terrane, the Yukon–Tanana terrane, and the Cassiar terrane. This belt goes from low hills to high mountains across its length, with the majority of the region being extremely rugged.

The Intermontane Belt is a flatter, more rounded region composed of three terranes, Stikinia, Quesnellia, and the Cache Creek terrane. The belt has a lower metamorphic grade than the Omineca Belt and ranges from 400 million to 10,000 years old. Volcanic activity has been recorded as occurring in the past 10,000 years, including at Nazko Cone and in the Satah Mountain volcanic field.

The Coast Belt is the single largest outpouring of granite and granodiorite in the Phanerozoic. It contains heavily metamorphosed fragments of both the terranes of the Insular Belt and the Intermontane Belt. In the southeast, there is a series of small terranes of both oceanic (Bridge River Vent and Chilliwack Batholith) and continental affinity (Jack Konat Mountain, Ladner). The hard-weathering granite is extensively rugged throughout the belt.

The Insular Belt is composed of the outboard terrane with no connection to North America before accretion. There are two main terranes—Wrangellia and the Alexander—and a few smaller ones such as the Pacific Rim terrane. Because the Insular Belt is the most tectonically active of the belts, it has the greatest relief differences from the depths of the Queen Charlotte Sound to the heights of the Wrangell–Saint Elias Mountains. The ages are from 600 million years to recent, with metamorphic grades depending on the age and host of the rock type.

== See also ==
- Coast Mountains
- Coast Range Arc
- Okanagan Highland
- Omineca Mountains
- Quesnel Highland
- Shuswap Highland
- Geology of the Pacific Northwest
- Volcanism of Canada
- Pacific Ring of Fire
