= Slide Mountain =

Slide Mountain may refer to:

- Slide Mountain (Coast Mountains), in British Columbia
- Slide Mountain (Montana), a mountain in Beaverhead County, Montana
- Slide Mountain (Nevada)
- Slide Mountain (Ulster County, New York)
- Slide Mountain Lookout

== See also ==
- Slide Mountain Ocean, an ancient ocean that existed between the Intermontane Islands and North America in the Triassic
- Slide Mountain terrane, a late Paleozoic terrane
- Slide Mountain Wilderness Area, a tract of state-owned Forest Preserve in New York
