= Insular Belt =

Physiogeological region of North America

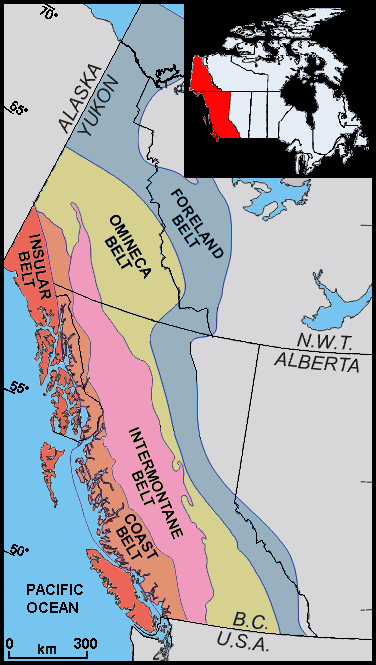
Geology belts of western Canada and southeast Alaska, including the Insular Belt (red)

The Insular Belt is a physiogeological region on the north western North American coast. It consists of three major island groups and many smaller islands and stretches from southern British Columbia into Alaska and the Yukon. It represents the Late Cretaceous to Eocene accretion of what is known as the Insular Superterrane (formed from repeated accretion of multiple terranes) to the North American continent.

The rocks that form the Insular Superterrane are allochthonous, meaning they are not related to the rest of the North American continent. They consist of a series of volcanics, intrusions and sedimentary rocks from the collision of an ancient island arc called the Insular Islands. The exact collision of the Insular Islands remains uncertain.

The major island groups that compose the Insular Superterrane are, from south to north, Vancouver Island and the Gulf Islands, the Haida Gwaii and the Alexander Archipelago in Alaska.

The region is noteworthy as it has the greatest physiographic relief from the depths of Queen Charlotte Sound (which had been a coastal plain during the last ice age) to the heights of the Wrangell - Saint Elias Mountains. In general the region is extremely rugged with very little flat land except in certain regions (e.g. the east coast of Vancouver Island).

The region is thickly forested, having a temperate year round climate, with many of the world's largest trees.

== See also ==
- Geology of British Columbia
- Intermontane Belt
- Okanagan Highland
- Omineca Mountains
- Quesnel Highland
