= Island arc =

Arc-shaped volcanic archipelago

Island arcs are long chains of active volcanoes with intense seismic activity found along convergent tectonic plate boundaries. Most island arcs originate on oceanic crust and have resulted from the descent of the lithosphere into the mantle along the subduction zone. They are the principal way by which continental growth is achieved.

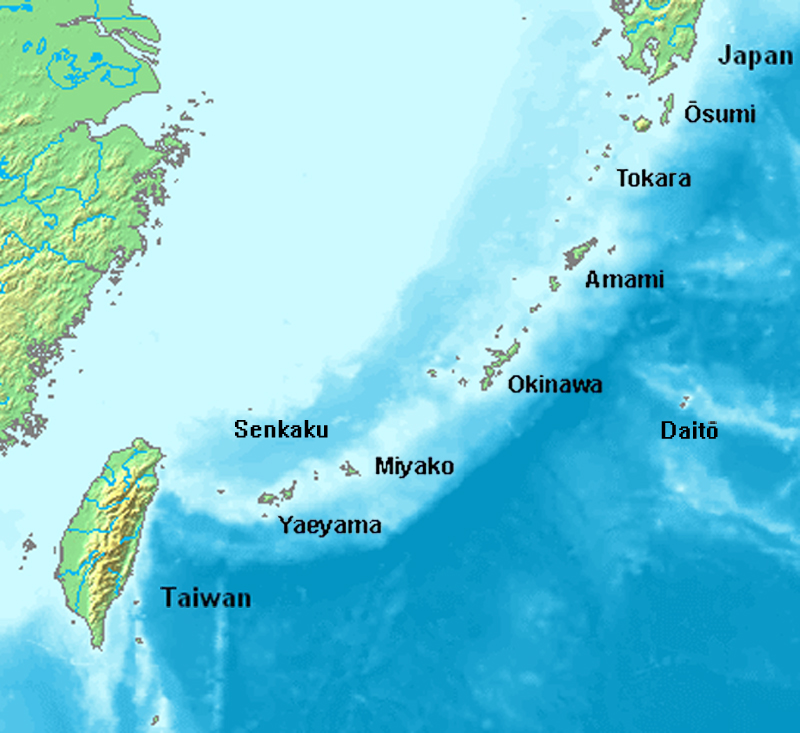
The Ryukyu Islands form an island arc.

Island arcs can either be active or inactive based on their seismicity and presence of volcanoes. Active arcs are ridges of recent volcanoes with an associated deep seismic zone. They also possess a distinct curved form, a chain of active or recently extinct volcanoes, a deep-sea trench, and a large negative Bouguer anomaly on the convex side of the volcanic arc. The small positive gravity anomaly associated with volcanic arcs has been interpreted by many authors as due to the presence of dense volcanic rocks beneath the arc. Inactive arcs are a chain of islands which contains older volcanic and volcaniclastic rocks.

The curved shape of many volcanic chains and the angle of the descending lithosphere are related. If the oceanic part of the plate is represented by the ocean floor on the convex side of the arc, and if the zone of flexing occurs beneath the submarine trench, then the deflected part of the plate coincides approximately with the Benioff zone beneath most arcs.

== Location ==
Most modern island arcs are near the continental margins (particularly in the northern and western margins of the Pacific Ocean). However, no direct evidence from within the arcs shows that they have always existed at their present position with respect to the continents, although evidence from some continental margins suggests that some arcs may have migrated toward the continents during the late Mesozoic or early Cenozoic. They are also found at oceanic-oceanic convergence zones, in which case the older plate will subduct under the younger one.

The movement of the island arcs towards the continent could be possible if, at some point, the ancient Benioff zones dipped toward the present ocean rather than toward the continent, as in most arcs today. This will have resulted in the loss of ocean floor between the arc and the continent, and consequently, in the migration of the arc during spreading episodes.

The fracture zones in which some active island arcs terminate may be interpreted in terms of plate tectonics as resulting from movement along transform faults, which are plate margins where the crust is neither being consumed nor generated. Thus the present location of these inactive island chains is due to the present pattern of lithospheric plates. However, their volcanic history, which indicates that they are fragments of older island arcs, is not necessarily related to the present plate pattern and may be due to differences in position of plate margins in the past.

== Tectonic formation ==
Two plates collide and create an island arc between them in the process.

Understanding the source of heat that causes the melting of the mantle was a contentious problem. Researchers believed that the heat was produced through friction at the top of the slab. However, this is unlikely because the viscosity of the asthenosphere decreases with increasing temperature, and at the temperatures required for partial fusion, the asthenosphere would have such a low viscosity that shear melting could not occur.

It is now believed that water acts as the primary agent that drives partial melting beneath arcs. It has been shown that the amount of water present in the down-going slab is related to the melting temperature of the mantle. The greater the amount of water present, the more the melting temperature of the mantle is reduced. This water is released during the transformation of minerals as pressure increases, with the mineral carrying the most water being serpentinite.

These metamorphic mineral reactions cause the dehydration of the upper part of the slab as the hydrated slab sinks. Heat is also transferred to it from the surrounding asthenosphere. As heat is transferred to the slab, temperature gradients are established such that the asthenosphere in the vicinity of the slab becomes cooler and more viscous than surrounding areas, particularly near the upper part of the slab. This more viscous asthenosphere is then dragged down with the slab causing less viscous mantle to flow in behind it. It is the interaction of this down-welling mantle with aqueous fluids rising from the sinking slab that is thought to produce partial melting of the mantle as it crosses its wet solidus. In addition, some melts may result from the up-welling of hot mantle material within the mantle wedge. If hot material rises quickly enough so that little heat is lost, the reduction in pressure may cause pressure release or decompression partial melting.

On the subducting side of the island arc is a deep and narrow oceanic trench, which is the trace at the Earth's surface of the boundary between the down-going and overriding plates. This trench is created by the downward gravitational pull of the relatively dense subducting plate on the leading edge of the plate. Multiple earthquakes occur along this subduction boundary with the seismic hypocenters located at increasing depth under the island arc: these quakes define the Benioff zone.

Island arcs can be formed in intra-oceanic settings, or from the fragments of continental crust that have migrated away from an adjacent continental land mass or at subduction-related volcanoes active at the margins of continents.

== Features ==
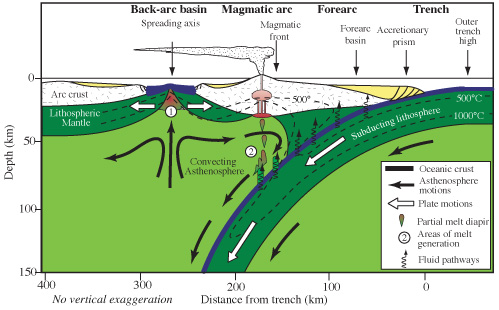
A schematic cross-section of an island arc from trench to back-arc basin

Below are some of the generalized features present in most island arcs.

Fore-arc: This region comprises the trench, the accretionary prism, and the fore-arc basin. A bump from the trench in the oceanward side of the system is present (Barbados in the Lesser Antilles is an example). The fore-arc basin forms between the fore-arc ridge and the island arc; it is a region of undisturbed flat-bedded sedimentation.

Trenches: These are the deepest features of ocean basins; the deepest being the Mariana trench (approximately 11,000 m or 36,000 ft). They are formed by flexing of the oceanic lithosphere, developing on the ocean side of island arcs.

Back-arc basin: They are also referred to as marginal seas and are formed in the inner, concave side of island arcs bounded by back-arc ridges. They develop in response to tensional tectonics due to rifting of an existing island arc.

Benioff zone or Wadati-Benioff zone: This is a plane that dips under the overriding plate where intense volcanic activity occurs, which is defined by the location of seismic events below the arc. Earthquakes occur from near surface to ~660 km depth. The dip of Benioff zones ranges from 30° to near vertical.

An ocean basin may be formed between the continental margin and the island arcs on the concave side of the arc. These basins have a crust which is either oceanic or intermediate between the normal oceanic crust and that typical of continents; heat flow in the basins is higher than in normal continental or oceanic areas.

Some arcs, such as the Aleutians, pass laterally into the continental shelf on the concave side of the arc, while most of the arcs are separated from the continental crust.

Movement between two lithospheric plates explains the major features of active island arcs. The island arc and small ocean basin are situated on the overlying plate which meets the descending plate containing normal oceanic crust along the Benioff zone. The sharp bending of the oceanic plate downward produces a trench.

== Volcanic rocks in the island arc ==
There are generally three volcanic series from which the types of volcanic rock that occur in island arcs are formed:

- The tholeiitic series – basaltic andesites and andesites.
- The calc-alkaline series – andesites.
- The alkaline series – subgroups of alkaline basalts and the rare, very high potassium-bearing (i.e. shoshonitic) lavas.

This volcanic series is related to the age of the subduction zone and the depth. The tholeiitic magma series is well represented above young subduction zones formed by magma from relative shallow depth. The calc-alkaline and alkaline series are seen in mature subduction zones, and are related to magma of greater depths. Andesite and basaltic andesite are the most abundant volcanic rock in island arc which is indicative of the calc-alkaline magmas. Some Island arcs have distributed volcanic series as can be seen in the Japanese island arc system where the volcanic rocks change from tholeiite—calc-alkaline—alkaline with increasing distance from the trench.

Several processes are involved in arc magmatism which gives rise to the great spectrum of rock composition encountered. These processes are, but not limited to, magma mixing, fractionation, variations in the depth and degree of partial melting and assimilation. Therefore, the three volcanic series results in a wide range of rock composition and do not correspond to absolute magma types or source regions.

== List of modern island arcs ==
| Island arc | Country | Trench | Basin or marginal sea | Overriding plate | Subducting plate |
|---|---|---|---|---|---|
| Aleutian Islands | United States | Aleutian Trench | Bering Sea | North American Plate | Pacific Plate |
| Kuril Islands | Russia | Kuril–Kamchatka Trench | Sea of Okhotsk | North American Plate | Pacific Plate |
| Japanese archipelago | Japan | Japan Trench, Nankai Trough | Sea of Japan | North American Plate, Eurasian Plate | Pacific Plate, Philippine Sea Plate |
| Ryukyu Islands | Japan | Ryukyu Trench | East China Sea (Okinawa Trough) | Eurasian Plate | Philippine Sea Plate |
| Philippine Islands | Philippines | Philippine Trench | South China Sea, Celebes Sea | Eurasian Plate | Philippine Sea Plate |
| Sunda Arc | Indonesia | Java Trench | Java Sea, Flores Sea | Eurasian Plate | Australian Plate |
| Andaman and Nicobar Islands | India | Northern Java Trench | Andaman Sea | Eurasian Plate | Indo-Australian Plate |
| Izu Islands and Bonin Islands (Ogasawara Islands) | Japan | Izu–Ogasawara Trench | | Philippine Sea Plate | Pacific Plate |
| Mariana Islands | United States | Mariana Trench | | Philippine Sea Plate | Pacific Plate |
| Bismarck Archipelago | Papua New Guinea | New Britain Trench | | Pacific Plate | Australian Plate |
| Solomon Islands (archipelago) | Solomon Islands | San Cristobal Trench | | Pacific Plate | Australian Plate |
| New Hebrides | Vanuatu | New Hebrides Trench | | Pacific Plate | Australian Plate |
| Tonga islands | Tonga | Tonga Trench | | Australian Plate | Pacific Plate |
| Antilles | | Puerto Rico Trench | Caribbean | Caribbean Plate | North American Plate, South American Plate |
| South Sandwich Islands | British Overseas Territory | South Sandwich Trench | Scotia Sea | Scotia Plate | South American Plate |
| Aegean or Hellenic arc | Greece | Eastern Mediterranean Trench | Aegean Sea | Aegean Sea Plate or Hellenic Plate | African Plate |

== Examples of ancient island arcs ==
Remains of former island arcs have been identified at some locations. The table below mention a selection of these.

| Island arc | Country | Fate |
|---|---|---|
| Chaitenia | Chile, Argentina | Accreted to Patagonia in the Devonian. |
| Insular Islands | Canada, United States | Accreted to North America in the Cretaceous. |
| Intermontane Islands | Canada, United States | Accreted to North America in the Jurassic. |

== See also ==
- Back-arc basin
- Volcanic arc
- Volcanic island
