= Kiyoo Wadati =

Kiyoo Wadati 和達 清夫
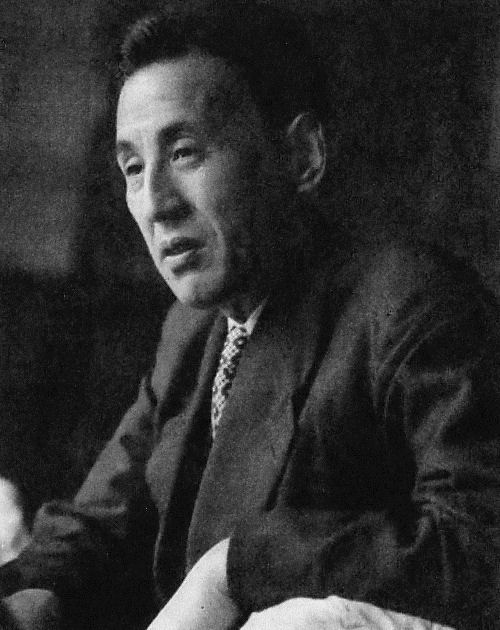
- Born: September 8, 1902; Nagoya, Japan
- Died: January 5, 1995 (aged 92); Tokyo, Japan
- Education: Imperial University of Tokyo
- Known for: Wadati–Benioff zone
- Scientific career
- Fields: seismology
- Workplaces: Central Meteorological Observatory

Kiyoo Wadati (和達 清夫, Wadachi Kiyoo; September 8, 1902 – January 5, 1995) was an early seismologist at the Central Meteorological Observatory of Japan (now known as the Japan Meteorological Agency), researching deep (subduction zone) earthquakes. His name is attached to the Wadati–Benioff zone. It was Wadati's 1928 paper on shallow and deep earthquakes, comparing maximum below surface displacement against distance from the epicentre, which led Charles Richter to develop his earthquake magnitude scale in 1935.

== See also ==
- List of geophysicists
