= Convergent boundary =

Region of active deformation between colliding tectonic plates

Simplified diagram of a convergent boundary

A convergent boundary (also known as a destructive boundary) is an area on Earth where two or more lithospheric plates collide. One plate eventually slides beneath the other, a process known as subduction. The subduction zone can be defined by a plane where many earthquakes occur, called the Wadati–Benioff zone. These collisions happen on scales of millions to tens of millions of years and can lead to volcanism, earthquakes, orogenesis, destruction of lithosphere, and deformation. Convergent boundaries occur between oceanic-oceanic lithosphere, oceanic-continental lithosphere, and continental-continental lithosphere. The geologic features related to convergent boundaries vary depending on crust types.

Plate tectonics is driven by convection currents in the mantle. Convection cells are the result of heat generated by the radioactive decay of elements in the mantle escaping to the surface and the return of cool materials from the surface to the mantle. These convection cells bring hot mantle material to the surface along spreading centers creating new crust. As this new crust is pushed away from the spreading center by the formation of newer crust, it cools, thins, and becomes denser. Subduction begins when this dense crust converges with a less dense crust. The force of gravity helps drive the subducting slab into the mantle. As the relatively cool subducting slab sinks deeper into the mantle, it is heated, causing hydrous minerals to break down. This releases water into the hotter asthenosphere, which leads to partial melting of the asthenosphere and volcanism. Both dehydration and partial melting occur along the 1,000 °C (1,830 °F) isotherm, generally at depths of 65 to 130 km (40 to 81 mi).

Some lithospheric plates consist of both continental and oceanic lithosphere. In some instances, initial convergence with another plate will destroy oceanic lithosphere, leading to convergence of two continental plates. Neither continental plate will subduct. It is likely that the plate may break along the boundary of continental and oceanic crust. Seismic tomography reveals pieces of lithosphere that have broken off during convergence.

== Subduction zones ==
Subduction zones are areas where one lithospheric plate slides beneath another at a convergent boundary due to lithospheric differences. These plates dip at an average of 45° but can vary. Subduction zones are often marked by an abundance of earthquakes, the result of internal deformation of the plate, convergence with the opposing plate, and bending at the oceanic trench. Earthquakes have been detected to a depth of 670 km (416 mi). The relatively cold and dense subducting plates are pulled into the mantle and help drive mantle convection.

== Ocean-to-ocean convergence ==
In collisions between two oceanic plates, the cooler, denser oceanic lithosphere sinks beneath the warmer, less dense oceanic lithosphere. As the slab sinks deeper into the mantle, it releases water from dehydration of hydrous minerals in the oceanic crust. This water reduces the melting temperature of rocks in the asthenosphere and causes partial melting. Partial melt will travel up through the asthenosphere, eventually, reach the surface, and form volcanic island arcs.

== Ocean-to-continent convergence ==
When oceanic lithosphere and continental lithosphere collide, the dense oceanic lithosphere subducts beneath the less dense continental lithosphere. An accretionary wedge forms on the continental crust as deep-sea sediments and oceanic crust are scraped from the oceanic plate. Volcanic arcs form on continental lithosphere as the result of partial melting due to dehydration of the hydrous minerals of the subducting slab.

== Continent-to-continent convergence ==
Some lithospheric plates consist of both continental and oceanic crust. Subduction initiates as oceanic lithosphere slides beneath continental crust. As the oceanic lithosphere subducts to greater depths, the attached continental crust is pulled closer to the subduction zone. Once the continental lithosphere reaches the subduction zone, subduction processes are altered, since continental lithosphere is more buoyant and resists subduction beneath other continental lithosphere. A small portion of the continental crust may be subducted until the slab breaks, allowing the oceanic lithosphere to continue subducting, hot asthenosphere to rise and fill the void, and the continental lithosphere to rebound. Evidence of this continental rebound includes ultrahigh pressure metamorphic rocks, which form at depths of 90 to 125 km (56 to 78 mi), that are exposed at the surface. Seismic records have been used to map the torn slabs beneath the Caucasus continental – continental convergence zone, and seismic tomography has mapped detached slabs beneath the Tethyan suture zone (the Alps – Zagros – Himalaya mountain belt).

== Volcanism and volcanic arcs ==
The oceanic crust contains hydrated minerals such as the amphibole and mica groups. During subduction, oceanic lithosphere is heated and metamorphosed, causing breakdown of these hydrous minerals, which releases water into the asthenosphere. The release of water into the asthenosphere leads to partial melting. Partial melting allows the rise of more buoyant, hot material and can lead to volcanism at the surface and emplacement of plutons in the subsurface. These processes which generate magma are not entirely understood.

Where these magmas reach the surface they create volcanic arcs. Volcanic arcs can form as island arc chains or as arcs on continental crust. Three magma series of volcanic rocks are found in association with arcs. The chemically reduced tholeiitic magma series is most characteristic of oceanic volcanic arcs, though this is also found in continental volcanic arcs above rapid subduction (>7 cm/year). This series is relatively low in potassium. The more oxidized calc-alkaline series, which is moderately enriched in potassium and incompatible elements, is characteristic of continental volcanic arcs. The alkaline magma series (highly enriched in potassium) is sometimes present in the deeper continental interior. The shoshonite series, which is extremely high in potassium, is rare but sometimes is found in volcanic arcs. The andesite member of each series is typically most abundant, and the transition from basaltic volcanism of the deep Pacific basin to andesitic volcanism in the surrounding volcanic arcs has been called the andesite line.

== Back-arc basins ==
Back-arc basins form behind a volcanic arc and are associated with extensional tectonics and high heat flow, often being home to seafloor spreading centers. These spreading centers are like mid-ocean ridges, though the magma composition of back-arc basins is generally more varied and contains a higher water content than mid-ocean ridge magmas. Back-arc basins are often characterized by thin, hot lithosphere. Opening of back-arc basins may arise from movement of hot asthenosphere into lithosphere, causing extension.

== Oceanic trenches ==
Oceanic trenches are narrow topographic lows that mark convergent boundaries or subduction zones. Oceanic trenches average 50 to 100 km (31 to 62 mi) wide and can be several thousand kilometers long. Oceanic trenches form as a result of bending of the subducting slab. Depth of oceanic trenches seems to be controlled by age of the oceanic lithosphere being subducted. Sediment fill in oceanic trenches varies and generally depends on abundance of sediment input from surrounding areas. An oceanic trench, the Mariana Trench, is the deepest point of the ocean at a depth of approximately 11,000 m (36,089 ft).

== Earthquakes and tsunamis ==
Earthquakes are common along convergent boundaries. A region of high earthquake activity, the Wadati–Benioff zone, generally dips 45° and marks the subducting plate. Earthquakes will occur to a depth of 670 km (416 mi) along the Wadati-Benioff margin.

Both compressional and extensional forces act along convergent boundaries. On the inner walls of trenches, compressional faulting or reverse faulting occurs due to the relative motion of the two plates. Reverse faulting scrapes off ocean sediment and leads to the formation of an accretionary wedge. Reverse faulting can lead to megathrust earthquakes. Tensional or normal faulting occurs on the outer wall of the trench, likely due to bending of the downgoing slab.

A megathrust earthquake can produce sudden vertical displacement of a large area of ocean floor. This in turn generates a tsunami.

Some of the deadliest natural disasters have occurred due to convergent boundary processes. The 2004 Indian Ocean earthquake and tsunami was triggered by a megathrust earthquake along the convergent boundary of the Indian plate and Burma microplate and killed over 200,000 people. The 2011 tsunami off the coast of Japan, which caused 16,000 deaths and did US$360 billion in damage, was caused by a magnitude 9 megathrust earthquake along the convergent boundary of the Eurasian plate and Pacific plate.

== Accretionary wedge ==
Accretionary wedges (also called accretionary prisms) form as sediment is scraped from the subducting lithosphere and emplaced against the overriding lithosphere. These sediments include igneous crust, turbidite sediments, and pelagic sediments. Imbricate thrust faulting along a basal decollement surface occurs in accretionary wedges as forces continue to compress and fault these newly added sediments. The continued faulting of the accretionary wedge leads to overall thickening of the wedge. Seafloor topography plays some role in accretion, especially emplacement of igneous crust.

== Examples ==
Map of Earth's principal plates (convergent boundaries shown as blue or mauve lines)

- The collision between the Eurasian plate and the Indian plate that is forming the Himalayas.
- The collision between the Australian plate and the Pacific plate that formed the Southern Alps in New Zealand.
- Subduction of the northern part of the Pacific plate and the NW North American plate that is forming the Aleutian Islands.
- Subduction of the Nazca plate beneath the South American plate to form the Andes.
- Subduction of the Pacific plate beneath the Australian plate and Tonga plate, forming the complex New Zealand to New Guinea subduction/transform boundaries.
- Collision of the Eurasian plate and the African plate formed the Pontic Mountains in Turkey.
- Subduction of the Pacific plate beneath the Philippine Sea plate formed the Mariana Trench.
- Subduction of the Juan de Fuca plate beneath the North American plate to form the Cascade Range.

== See also ==
- List of tectonic plates
- List of tectonic plate interactions – Types of plate boundaries
- Obduction – Geological process at tectonic plate boundaries
