= Farallon Trench =

Tectonic formation of the Cenozoic era

The Farallon Trench was a subduction related tectonic formation located off the coast of the western California continental margin during the late to mid Cenozoic era, around 50 miles southeast of modern-day Monterey Bay. The time duration of subduction began from around 165 Ma when the Farallon Plate replaced the Mezcalera promontory, until the San Andreas Fault straightening around 35 Ma. As data accumulated over time, a common view developed that one large oceanic plate, the Farallon Plate, acted as a conveyor belt, conveying accreted terranes onto the North American west coast. As the continent overran the subducting Farallon Plate, the denser plate became subducted into the mantle below the continent. When the plates converged, the dense oceanic plate sank into the mantle to form a slab below the lighter continent. Rapid subduction under the southwestern North America continent began 40 to 60 million years ago (Ma), during the mid Paleocene to mid Eocene epochs. This convergent subduction margin created a distinctive geomorphologic feature called an oceanic trench, which occurs at a convergent plate boundaries as a heavy metal rich, lithospheric plate moves below a light silica rich continental plate. The trench marks the position at which the flexed subducting slab begins to descend beneath and deform the continental plate margin. By 43 Ma, during the Eocene, worldwide plate motions changed and the Pacific Plate began to move away from North America and subduction of the Farallon Plate slowed dramatically. By around 36 Ma, the easternmost part of the East Pacific Rise, located between the Pioneer and Murray fracture zones at that time, approached the trench and the young, hot, buoyant lithosphere appears to have clogged part of the subduction zone, resulting in widespread dramatic uplift on land. The eventual complete subduction of this plate, consequential contact of the Pacific Plate with the California continental margin, and creation of the Mendocino triple junction (MTJ), took place around 30 to 20 Ma. The partial complete subduction and division of the Farallon Plate by the Pacific Plate, created the Juan de Fuca Plate to the north and the Cocos Plate to the south. The final stages of the evolution of California's continental margin was the growth of the San Andreas transform fault system, which formed as the Pacific Plate came into contact with the continental margin and the MTJ was formed. As subduction of the Pacific Plate continued along this margin, and the contact zone grew, the San Andreas proportionally grew as well.

== Geologic evidence ==
Evidence of the existence of the Farallon Trench and past subduction of the Farallon Plate is evident in specific geologic units observed along paleo-coastlines of the west coast of the United States and California continental region. Late Cretaceous–Paleogene magma can be seen overlying subhorizontally subducted sediments from the Farallon Plate as far inland as Utah and Arizona. The earliest record of subhorizontal subduction of the Farallon slab is the extinguishing of magmatism in the Sierra Nevada batholith of California roughly 85 Ma. As the Farallon Plate subducted below the California continental margin an accretionary wedge was formed in the trench, which yielded unique rock types as a result of regional metamorphism. The formation of Franciscan Melange and blueschist units along paleo-coastlines resulted from this subduction and are direct evidence of the Farallon Plate's past existence. Other forms of evidence include the Farallon Islands, Catalina Islands, and uplift of the Diablo Mountain Range as a result of the clogged subduction zone mentioned above. These observations can be explained by a model for the weakening and ultimate falling apart of the uppermost part of the subducted oceanic plate in the 20–30 m.y. after the end of rapid subduction. As the plate falls apart, not only is compressional stress relieved, but significant back-slip along the old subduction zone is also possible, perhaps bringing blueschist rapidly upward from 20- to 30-km depths, where it can be observed along the California coast to this day.

== Recent research ==
To understand the subduction of the Farallon Plate, the creation of the Farallon Trench, and the present location of the subducted plate, detailed seismic tomography was used to render images of the existing submerged remnants. The plate can now be seen at depths of around 200 km below the central continental United States. Since the North American coast shows an extremely complicated geologic structure, intensive work has been required to understand the complexity of this system. In 2013 a new explanation emerged from recent research, proposing two additional now fully subducted plates, accounting for some of the complexity of this coast line. As of 2013, it is generally accepted that the western quarter of North America consists of accreted terrane accumulated over roughly the past 200 m.y as the remnant Farallon Plate (the Juan De Fuca and Cocos plates) continues to convey oceanic terrane onto the continental margin. This model, however, was unable to explain many terrane complexities, and is inconsistent with seismic tomographic images of subducting slabs which penetrate the lower-mantle. Further study will be needed to understand this inconsistency in data and will, with all luck, provide a solid and concrete understanding of the western continental margin of North America and its complexities upon completion.

== See also ==
- Farallon Plate
- Juan de Fuca Plate
- List of tectonic plates
- North American Plate
