= Bridge River Ocean =

Ancient ocean between North America and the Insular Islands during the Mesozoic

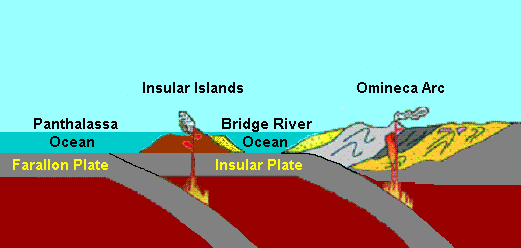
The Bridge River Ocean between North America and the Insular Islands

The Bridge River Ocean was an ancient ocean that existed between North America and the Insular Islands during the Mesozoic era. Similar to the earlier Slide Mountain Ocean, the Bridge River Ocean had a subduction zone on the ocean floor called the Insular Trench. The closure of the Bridge River Ocean occurred about 115 million years ago, during the mid Cretaceous period.

The namesake of the Bridge River Ocean is the Bridge River in the Canadian province of British Columbia, about 100 miles north of the city of Vancouver.

== See also ==
- List of ancient oceans – List of Earth's former oceans
