= Insular Islands =

Ancient North American volcanic island chain

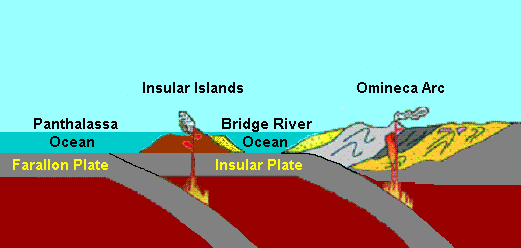
The Bridge River Ocean between North America and the Insular and Omineca volcanic arcs

The Insular Islands were an extended chain of volcanic islands forming an arc in what is now the Pacific Ocean during the Paleozoic and Mesozoic eras. The islands formed by subduction and melting of the Farallon Plate along a fragment (or microplate) upon which they rose called the Insular Plate. They were bounded by the Panthalassic Ocean to the west and the Bridge River Ocean to the east. They probably formed as a composite of several volcanic chains near the equator, offshore of continental landmasses, by the Carboniferous Period around 300-325 million years ago.

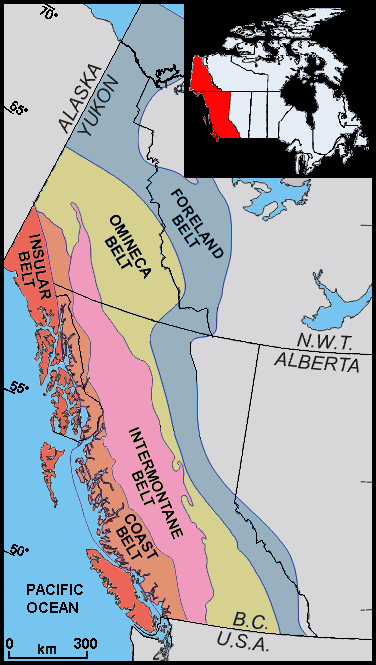
Geologic belts of far-western Canada and Southeast Alaska, including the Insular Belt (red)

The chain continually moved northward during the Mesozoic. About 115 million years ago in the mid-Cretaceous they finally collided with and fused onto the North American Plate. Like the earlier Intermontane Islands which underwent a similar continental accretion 60 million years before, the large mass of the islands preventing them from being pushed under the North American Plate. This violent collision halted subduction which fed volcanic activity in the Omineca Arc and closed the Bridge River Ocean. The subduction zone moved westward to the Farallon Trench, causing new volcanism which formed the Coast Range Arc.

Rocks of the Insular Islands now comprise wide sections of the westernmost coast of the North American plate. This includes both the Insular Mountains of the Alaskan Panhandle, Haida Gwaii, and Vancouver Island, and sunken areas of the greater Insular Belt which takes into consideration rock formed on the floor of the Bridge River Ocean. This extends to the northern North Cascades range in Washington State, perhaps as far as the Wallowa Mountains in northeastern Oregon which may be a displaced fragment from the Insular Belt. The "suture" at the former continental margin is now a major northwest-trending fault through the North Cascades, the 10 kilometers wide, 500 kilometer long Ross Lake Fault.

== See also ==
- Geology of British Columbia
