= Intermontane Trench =

Ancient oceanic trench during the Triassic, parallel to the west coast of North America

The Intermontane Trench was an ancient oceanic trench during the Triassic. The trench was probably 600 to 800 miles (970 to 1,290 km) long, parallel to the west coast of North America. The ocean that the trench was located in was called the Slide Mountain Ocean.

== See also ==
- Intermontane Islands
- Intermontane Plate
