= Cassiar terrane =

Cretaceous terrane in Canada

The Cassiar terrane is a 1,500 km (930 mi) long Cretaceous terrane located in the Northern Interior of British Columbia and southern Yukon. It consists of miogeoclinal strata and contains the Cassiar Batholith, a 100-million-year-old igneous intrusion and the single largest intrusive body in the hinterland of the Canadian portion of the Western Cordillera.
