= Insular plate =

Ancient oceanic plate

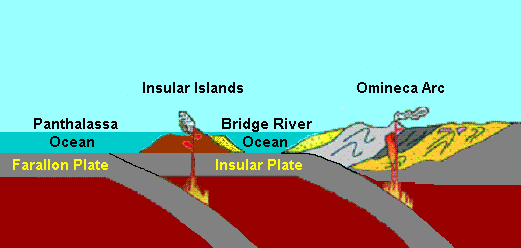
Plate tectonics along the west coast of North America 130 million years ago

The Insular plate was an ancient oceanic plate that began subducting under the west-coast of North America around the early Cretaceous period. The Insular plate had a chain of active volcanic islands that were called the Insular Islands. These volcanic islands, however, collided then fused onto the west-coast of North America when the Insular plate jammed then shut down ending the subduction zone.

== See also ==
- Insular Mountains
