= Volcanic arc =

Chain of volcanoes formed above a subducting plate

Volcanic arc formation along a subducting plate

A volcanic arc (also known as a magmatic arc) is a belt of volcanoes formed above a subducting oceanic tectonic plate, with the belt arranged in an arc shape as seen from above. Volcanic arcs typically parallel an oceanic trench, with the arc located further from the subducting plate than the trench. The oceanic plate is saturated with water, mostly in the form of hydrous minerals such as micas, amphiboles, and serpentines. As the oceanic plate is subducted, it is subjected to increasing pressure and temperature with increasing depth. The heat and pressure break down the hydrous minerals in the plate, releasing water into the overlying mantle. Volatiles such as water drastically lower the melting point of the mantle, causing some of the mantle to melt and form magma at depth under the overriding plate. The magma ascends to form an arc of volcanoes parallel to the subduction zone.

Volcanic arcs are distinct from volcanic chains formed over hotspots in the middle of a tectonic plate. Volcanoes often form one after another as the plate moves over the hotspot, and so the volcanoes progress in age from one end of the chain to the other. The Hawaiian Islands form a typical hotspot chain, with the older islands to the northwest and Hawaii Island itself, which is just 400,000 years old, at the southeast end of the chain over the hotspot. Volcanic arcs do not generally exhibit such a simple age-pattern.

There are two types of volcanic arcs:

- intraoceanic arcs (primitive arcs) form when oceanic crust subducts beneath other oceanic crust on an adjacent plate, creating a volcanic island arc.
- continental arcs form when oceanic crust subducts beneath continental crust on an adjacent plate, creating an arc-shaped mountain belt.

In some situations, a single subduction zone may show both aspects along its length, as part of a plate subducts beneath a continent and part beneath adjacent oceanic crust. The Aleutian Islands and adjoining Alaskan Peninsula are an example of such a subduction zone.

The active front of a volcanic arc is the belt where volcanism develops at a given time. Active fronts may move over time (millions of years), changing their distance from the oceanic trench as well as their width.

== Tectonic setting ==
A volcanic arc is part of an arc-trench complex, which is the part of a subduction zone that is visible at the Earth's surface. A subduction zone is where a tectonic plate composed of relatively thin, dense oceanic lithosphere sinks into the Earth's mantle beneath a less dense overriding plate. The overriding plate may be either another oceanic plate or a continental plate. The subducting plate, or slab, sinks into the mantle at an angle, so that there is a wedge of mantle between the slab and the overriding plate.

The boundary between the subducting plate and the overriding plate coincides with a deep and narrow oceanic trench. This trench is created by the gravitational pull of the relatively dense subducting plate pulling the leading edge of the plate downward. Multiple earthquakes occur within the subducting slab with the seismic hypocenters located at increasing depth under the island arc: these quakes define the Wadati–Benioff zones. The volcanic arc forms on the overriding plate over the point where the subducting plate reaches a depth of roughly 120 kilometres (75 mi) and is a zone of volcanic activity between 50 and 200 kilometers (31 and 124 mi) in width.

The shape of a volcanic arc is typically convex towards the subducting plate. This is a consequence of the spherical geometry of the Earth. The subducting plate behaves like a flexible thin spherical shell, and such a shell be bent downwards by an angle of θ, without tearing or wrinkling, only on a circle whose radius is θ/2. This means that arcs where the subducting slab descends at a shallower angle will be more tightly curved. Prominent arcs whose slabs subduct at about 45 degrees, such as the Kuril Islands, the Aleutian Islands, and the Sunda Arc, have a radius of about 20 to 22 degrees.

Volcanic arcs are divided into those in which the overriding plate is continental (Andean-type arcs) and those in which the overriding plate is oceanic (intraoceanic or primitive arcs). The crust beneath the arc is up to twice as thick as average continental or oceanic crust: The crust under Andean-type arcs is up to 80 kilometers (50 mi) thick, while the crust under intraoceanic arcs is 20 to 35 kilometers (12 to 22 mi) thick. Both shortening of the crust and magmatic underplating contribute to thickening of the crust.

Volcanic arcs are characterized by explosive eruption of calc-alkaline magma, though young arcs sometimes erupt tholeiitic magma and a few arcs erupt alkaline magma. Calc-alkaline magma can be distinguished from tholeiitic magma, typical of mid-ocean ridges, by its higher aluminium and lower iron content and by its high content of large-ion lithophile elements, such as potassium, rubidium, caesium, strontium, or barium, relative to high-field-strength elements, such as zirconium, niobium, hafnium, rare-earth elements (REE), thorium, uranium, or tantalum. Andesite is particularly characteristic of volcanic arcs, though it sometimes also occurs in regions of crustal extension.

In the rock record, volcanic arcs can be recognized from their thick sequences of volcaniclastic rock (formed by explosive volcanism) interbedded with greywackes and mudstones and by their calc-alkaline composition. In more ancient rocks that have experienced metamorphism and alteration of their composition (metasomatism), calc-alkaline rocks can be distinguished by their content of trace elements that are little affected by alteration, such as chromium or titanium, whose content is low in volcanic arc rocks. Because volcanic rock is easily weathered and eroded, older volcanic arcs are seen as plutonic rocks, the rocks that formed underneath the arc (e.g. the Sierra Nevada batholith), or in the sedimentary record as lithic sandstones. Paired metamorphic belts, in which a belt of high-temperature, low-pressure metamorphism is located parallel to a belt of low-temperature, high-pressure metamorphism, preserve an ancient arc-trench complex in which the high-temperature, low-pressure belt corresponds to the volcanic arc.

== Petrology ==
In a subduction zone, loss of water from the subducted slab induces partial melting of the overriding mantle and generates low-density, calc-alkaline magma that buoyantly rises to intrude and be extruded through the lithosphere of the overriding plate. Most of the water carried downwards by the slab is contained in hydrous (water-bearing) minerals, such as mica, amphibole, or serpentinite minerals. Water is lost from the subducted plate when the temperature and pressure become sufficient to break down these minerals and release their water content. The water rises into the wedge of mantle overlying the slab and lowers the melting point of mantle rock to the point where magma is generated.

While there is wide agreement on the general mechanism, research continues on the explanation for focused volcanism along a narrow arc some distance from the trench. The distance from the trench to the volcanic arc is greater for slabs subducting at a shallower angle, and this suggests that magma generation takes place when the slab reached a critical depth for the breakdown of an abundant hydrous mineral. This would produce an ascending "hydrous curtain" that accounts for focused volcanism along the volcanic arc. However, some models suggest that water is continuously released from the slab from shallow depths down to 70 to 300 kilometers (43 to 186 mi), and much of the water released at shallow depths produces serpentinization of the overlying mantle wedge. According to one model, only about 18 to 37 percent of the water content is released at sufficient depth to produce arc magmatism. The volcanic arc is then interpreted as the depth at which the degree of melting becomes great enough to allow the magma to separate from its source rock.

It is now known that the subducting slab may be located anywhere from 60 to 173 kilometers (37 to 107 mi) below the volcanic arc, rather than a single characteristic depth of around 120 kilometers (75 mi), which requires more elaborate models of arc magmatism. For example, water released from the slab at moderate depths might react with amphibole minerals in the lower part of the mantle wedge to produce water-rich chlorite. This chlorite-rich mantle rock is then dragged downwards by the subducting slab, and eventually breaks down to become the source of arc magmatism. The location of the arc depends on the angle and rate of subduction, which determine where hydrous minerals break down and where the released water lowers the melting point of the overlying mantle wedge enough for melting.

The location of the volcanic arc may be determined by the presence of a cool shallow corner at the tip of the mantle wedge, where the mantle rock is cooled by both the overlying plate and the slab. Not only does the cool shallow corner suppress melting, but its high stiffness hinders the ascent of any magma that is formed. Arc volcanism takes place where the slab descends out from under the cool shallow corner, allowing magma to be generated and rise through warmer, less stiff mantle rock.

Magma may be generated over a broad area but become focused into a narrow volcanic arc by a permeability barrier at the base of the overriding plate. Numerical simulations suggest that crystallization of rising magma creates this barrier, causing the remaining magma to pool in a narrow band at the apex of the barrier. This narrow band corresponds to the overlying volcanic arc.

== Examples ==
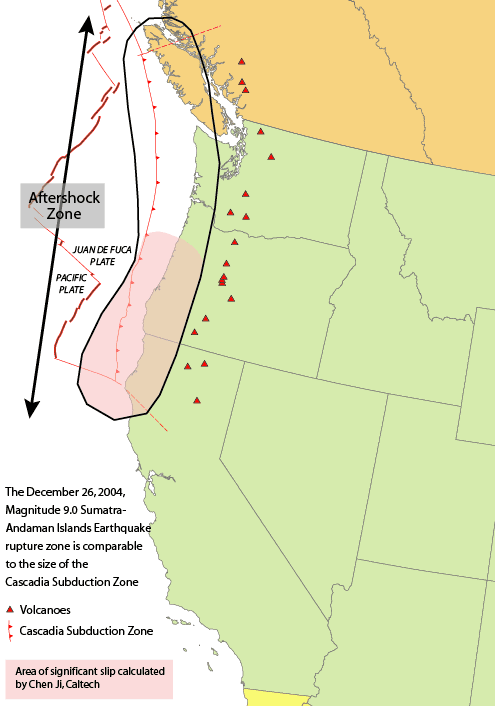
Cascade Volcanic Arc, a continental volcanic arc

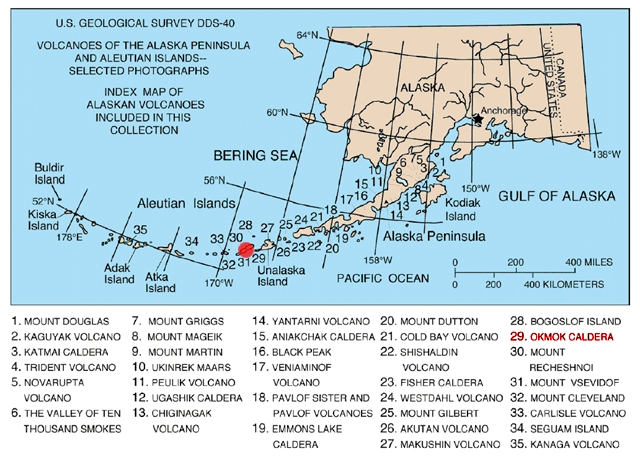
The Aleutian Arc, with both oceanic and continental parts

Two classic examples of oceanic island arcs are the Mariana Islands in the western Pacific Ocean and the Lesser Antilles in the western Atlantic Ocean. The Cascade Volcanic Arc in western North America and the Andes along the western edge of South America are examples of continental volcanic arcs. The best examples of volcanic arcs with both sets of characteristics are in the North Pacific, with the Aleutian Arc consisting of the Aleutian Islands and their extension the Aleutian Range on the Alaska Peninsula, and the Kuril–Kamchatka Arc comprising the Kuril Islands and southern Kamchatka Peninsula.

=== Continental arcs ===
- Cascade Volcanic Arc
- Alaska Peninsula and Aleutian Range
- Kamchatka
- Andes
  - Northern Volcanic Zone
  - Central Volcanic Zone
  - Southern Volcanic Zone
  - Austral Volcanic Zone
- Central America Volcanic Arc
- Trans-Mexican Volcanic Belt

=== Island arcs ===
==== Pacific Ocean ====
- Aleutian Islands
- Kuril Islands
- Northeastern Japan Arc
- Japanese archipelago including the Ryukyu Islands
- Izu–Bonin–Mariana Arc:
  - Izu Islands
  - Bonin Islands
  - Mariana Islands
- Luzon Volcanic Arc
- Philippines
- Tonga and Kermadec Islands
- Solomon Islands

==== Indian Ocean ====
- Andaman and Nicobar Islands
- Mentawai Islands
- Sunda Arc
  - Lesser Sunda Islands
- Tanimbar and Kai Islands
- Mascarene Islands

==== Mediterranean ====
- Aeolian Islands
- South Aegean Volcanic Arc

==== Atlantic Ocean ====
- Lesser Antilles, including the Leeward Antilles
- Scotia Arc
  - South Sandwich Islands

=== Ancient island arcs ===
- Insular Islands
- Intermontane Islands
- Sakhalin Island Arc

== See also ==
- Back-arc basin
- Island arc
- Subduction zone metamorphism
- Volcanic field
- Volcanic island
