= Omineca Arc =

Volcanic arc terrane in western North America

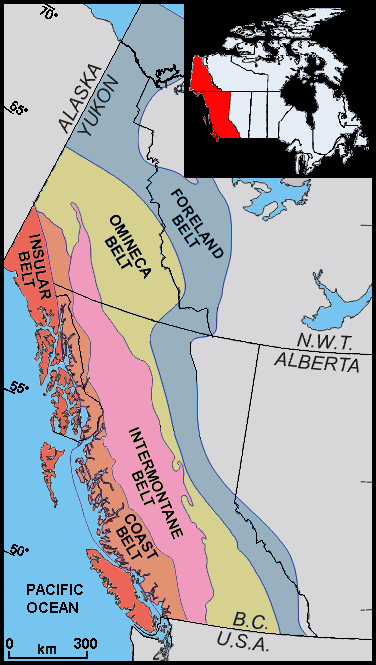
The Omineca and other terranes of western Canada

The Omineca Arc was a Jurassic-to-Cretaceous volcanic arc of the Omineca Belt in western North America, extending from Alaska through Yukon and British Columbia to Washington. The Omineca is bounded by the Foreland Belt to the east and the Intermontane Belt to the west. It is named after the Omineca Mountains of north-central British Columbia.

== See also ==
- Volcanology of Canada – Volcanic activity in Canada
- Volcanology of Northern Canada – History of volcanic activity in Northern Canada
- Volcanology of Western Canada
