= Slide Mountain terrane =

Late Paleozoic terrane in British Columbia, Canada

The Slide Mountain terrane is a late Paleozoic terrane made of a complex of oceanic rocks in northern and southern British Columbia, Canada. The rocks of the terrane include Carboniferous limestones, fine grained quartz rich clastics, conglomerates and volcanic rocks. Permian Kalso Group mafic volcanics are included. The Kalso Group volcanics originated from an ocean ridge environment adjacent to the Permian continental margin.

These oceanic rocks were derived from the seafloor of the prehistoric Slide Mountain Ocean, the Intermontane Plate, which was subducted under the North American Plate.
