= Wadati–Benioff zone =

Planar zone of seismicity corresponding with the down-going slab

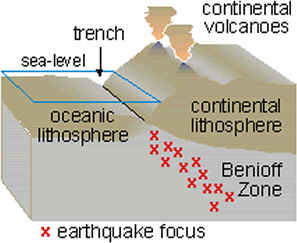
Diagram of Wadati–Benioff zone, from the United States Geological Survey

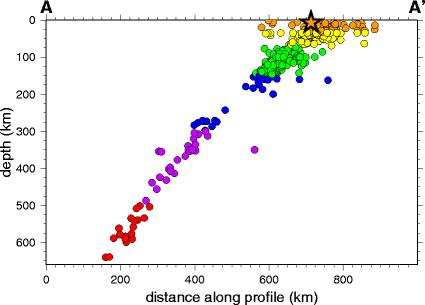
Seismicity cross-section, Kuril Islands subduction zone, 15 November 2006, 8.3 M_{w} event marked as star

A Wadati–Benioff zone (also Benioff–Wadati zone or Benioff zone or Benioff seismic zone) is a planar zone of seismicity corresponding with the down-going slab in a subduction zone. Differential motion along the zone produces numerous earthquakes, the foci of which may be as deep as about 670 km (420 mi). The term was named for the two seismologists, Hugo Benioff of the California Institute of Technology and Kiyoo Wadati of the Japan Meteorological Agency, who independently discovered the zones.

Wadati–Benioff zone earthquakes develop beneath volcanic island arcs and continental margins above active subduction zones. They can be produced by slip along the subduction thrust fault or slip on faults within the downgoing plate, as a result of bending and extension as the plate is pulled into the mantle. The deep-focus earthquakes along the zone allow seismologists to map the three-dimensional surface of a subducting slab of oceanic crust and mantle.

== Discovery ==
In 1949, Hugo Benioff introduced a method for determining elastic-rebound strain increments of earthquakes on a particular fault. He determined that the square root of an earthquake's energy is proportional to both the elastic rebound strain increment and the rebound displacement, and developed a way to determine whether a series of earthquakes was generated along a single fault structure. His research focused on the Kermadec-Tonga subduction zone and the South American subduction zone, and determined that in both locations, earthquake foci fall along planes dipping ~45° from the trenches. These planes of seismicity were later termed Benioff zones, or Wadati–Benioff zones for Kiyoo Wadati, who had made similar observations twenty years earlier.

== Structure ==
The angle of dip of the subducting slab, and therefore the Benioff seismic zone, is dominantly controlled by the negative buoyancy of the slab and forces from the flowing of the asthenosphere. Younger lithosphere is hotter and more buoyant, resulting in shallow-dipping Benioff zones, whereas older lithosphere is denser and colder, causing steeper dips. The Benioff zone spans from near-surface to depths of up to 670 km. The upper bound is just beneath the weak sediments in the toe of the wedge of the subduction zone, and the lower bound is where the brittle-ductile transition occurs. Most earthquakes occur within the 1000 °C isotherm, in the interior of the slab that has not yet heated up to match the temperature of the surrounding mantle into which it is being subducted. At depths below the thickness of the lithosphere, earthquakes are no longer generated by thrusting at the interface of the two plates, because the asthenosphere is weak and cannot support the stresses necessary for faulting. In this region, internal deformation of the still-cool down-going slab is the source of the earthquakes. Up to depths of 300 km, dehydration reactions and the formation of eclogite are the main causes of seismicity. Below 300 km, beginning at approximately the 700 °C isotherm, a mineralogical phase change from olivine to spinel occurs, and is thought to be the dominant earthquake mechanism of these very deep-seated earthquakes.

== Double Benioff zones ==
In some cases, subduction zones show two parallel surfaces of seismicity separated by tens of kilometres at intermediate depths (50–200 km). A primary example of this is located along Japan's largest island of Honshu, where the Wadati–Benioff zone is characterized by two well-defined lines of earthquake foci, with a distance between each line of 30–40 kilometers. A study of the global prevalence of double Benioff zones has found that they are common in subduction zones worldwide.

The uppermost seismicity surface is in the crust of the down-going slab and attributed to the dehydration reactions within this oceanic crust resulting in the formation of eclogite. The mechanism behind the lower zone of seismicity, located in the upper mantle portion of the down-going lithosphere, is still debated; the global ubiquity of double Benioff zones indicates that it must be a process that commonly occurs in subduction zones. Some of the suggested instability mechanisms include dehydration embrittlement caused by the breakdown of antigorite or chlorite in a hydrated peridotite upper mantle, and un-bending of the slab. Observations from seismic studies indicate that the lithospheric mantle at the intermediate depths where double Benioff zones occur is dry, which favours the proposed slab-unbending mechanism.
