= Intermontane Islands =

Triassic islands arcs

The Intermontane Islands were a system of volcanic island arcs that formed in the Pacific Ocean during the Triassic Period. Rather than a single continuous chain, they likely consisted of multiple island arcs and associated oceanic regions. These islands developed above subduction zones, where oceanic crust was forced beneath other oceanic plates, generating volcanic activity.

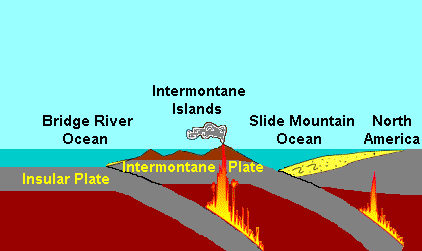

During the Late Triassic to Early Jurassic, the ocean basin separating the Intermontane Islands from the Slide Mountain Ocean (western margin of North America) began to close as oceanic crust subducted beneath the continent. This process gradually brought the island arcs closer to North America.

By the Early Jurassic, the Intermontane Islands collided with the continental margin. Because the island arcs were relatively buoyant compared to the subducting oceanic plate, they were not carried deep into the earth's mantle. Instead, they were accreted onto the edge of the continent, becoming permanently attached. This accretion formed a major part of what is now British Columbia and contributed to the development of the Intermontane Belt. Today, the rocks that make up these former islands record a history of volcanic activity, oceanic environments, and continental collision.

== See also ==
- Island arc
- Insular Islands
- Intermontane terranes
- Intermontane Belt
