= Slide Mountain Ocean =

Ancient ocean between the Intermontane Islands and North America

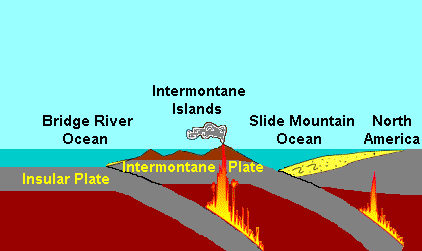
Plate tectonics of the Intermontane Islands arc 195 million years ago

The Slide Mountain Ocean was an ancient ocean that existed between the Intermontane Islands and North America beginning around 245 million years ago in the Triassic period. It is named after the Slide Mountain terrane, which is composed of rocks from the ancient oceanic floor. There was a subduction zone on the Slide Mountain Ocean's floor called the Intermontane Trench where the Intermontane Plate was being subducted under North America. The floor of the Slide Mountain Ocean was pushed up onto the ancient margin of North America.
