= Jim Haberl Hut =

Coordinates: 49°47′57″N 123°18′35″W

The Jim Haberl Hut is an alpine hut located in the Tantalus Range near Squamish, British Columbia. The hut is maintained by the Alpine Club of Canada - Vancouver Section.

The hut sleeps 12, and is equipped with mattresses, cooking utensils, propane cooktops, and a propane heater. It was named for mountain guide, author and photojournalist Jim Haberl, who was killed in an avalanche while mountaineering in Alaska on April 29, 1999. The hut was built with the generous assistance of Alpine Club of Canada volunteers, the Jim Haberl Fund, and the Department of National Defense, 192 Airfield Engineering Flight in Abbotsford, BC.

The hut is located in the Serratus-Dione col, about a 6-hour hike above Lake Lovely Water and the Tantalus Hut or a full 14 hours (usually done over two days) from the Squamish River. The site is located on the edge of Tantalus Provincial Park.

== Nearby ==
- Tantalus Range
- Mount Tantalus (2603m)
- Mount Dione (2590m)
- Alpha Mountain (2305m)
- Serratus Mountain (2326m)
