= Mount Thyestes =

Mountain in British Columbia, Canada

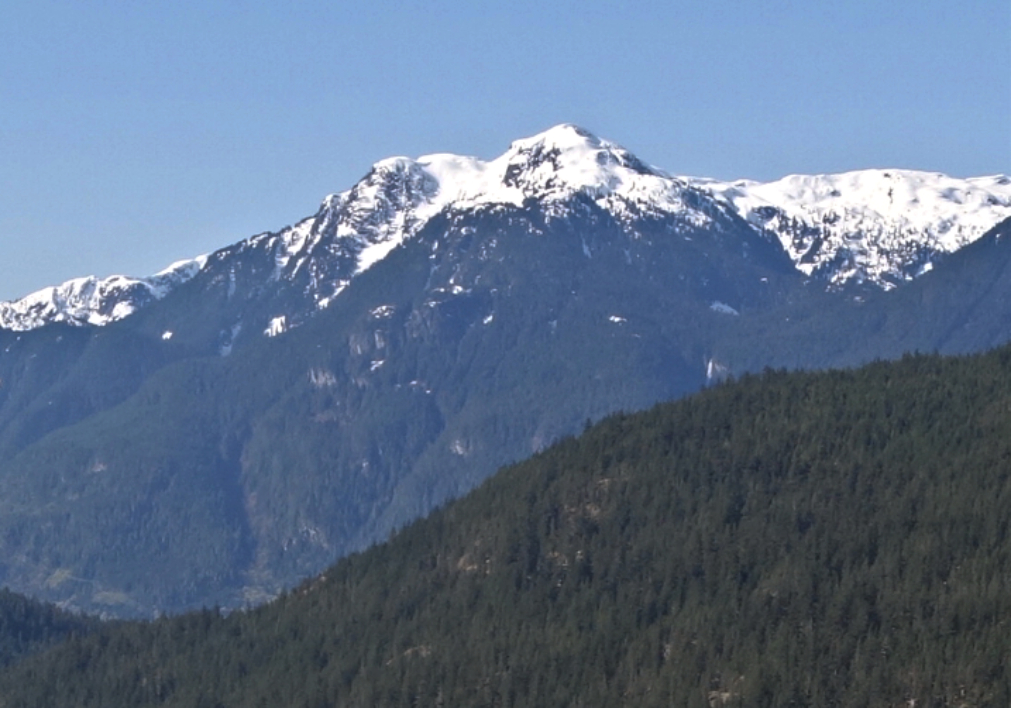
- Mount Thyestes, northeast aspect

Highest point
- Elevation: 1,697 m (5,568 ft)
- Prominence: 187 m (614 ft)
- Parent peak: Mount Niobe (2021 m)
- Listing: Mountains of British Columbia
- Coordinates: 49°45′17″N 123°13′02″W

Geography
- Location within British Columbia Location within Canada
- Interactive map of Mount Thyestes
- Country: Canada
- Province: British Columbia
- District: New Westminster Land District
- Protected area: Tantalus Provincial Park
- Parent range: Tantalus Range; Coast Ranges
- Topo map: NTS 92G14 Cheakamus River

Climbing
- First ascent: 1942 by R. McLellan, F. Roots, H. Parliament
- Easiest route: Scramble

Mount Thyestes is a 1,697-metre (5,568-foot) mountain summit located in the Tantalus Range, in Tantalus Provincial Park, in southwestern British Columbia, Canada. It is situated 4 km (2 mi) immediately west of Brackendale, 7 km (4 mi) northwest of Squamish, and 10.7 km (7 mi) southeast of Mount Tantalus, which is the highest peak in the Tantalus Range. Its nearest higher peak is Omega Mountain, 2.4 km (1 mi) to the northwest, and Mount Pelops lies 3.6 km (2 mi) to the west-northwest. Precipitation runoff from the peak drains into tributaries of the Squamish River. The first ascent of the mountain was made in 1942 by R. McLellan, H. Parliament, and F. Roots. The mountain was named for Thyestes, son of Pelops and grandson of Tantalus according to Greek mythology. The mountain's name was officially adopted on June 6, 1957, by the Geographical Names Board of Canada.

== Climate ==
Based on the Köppen climate classification, Mount Thyestes is located in the marine west coast climate zone of western North America. Most weather fronts originate in the Pacific Ocean, and travel east toward the Coast Mountains where they are forced upward by the range (Orographic lift), causing them to drop their moisture in the form of rain or snowfall. As a result, the Coast Mountains experience high precipitation, especially during the winter months in the form of snowfall. Temperatures can drop below −20 °C with wind chill factors below −30 °C. The months July through September offer the most favorable weather for climbing Thyestes.

== Gallery ==
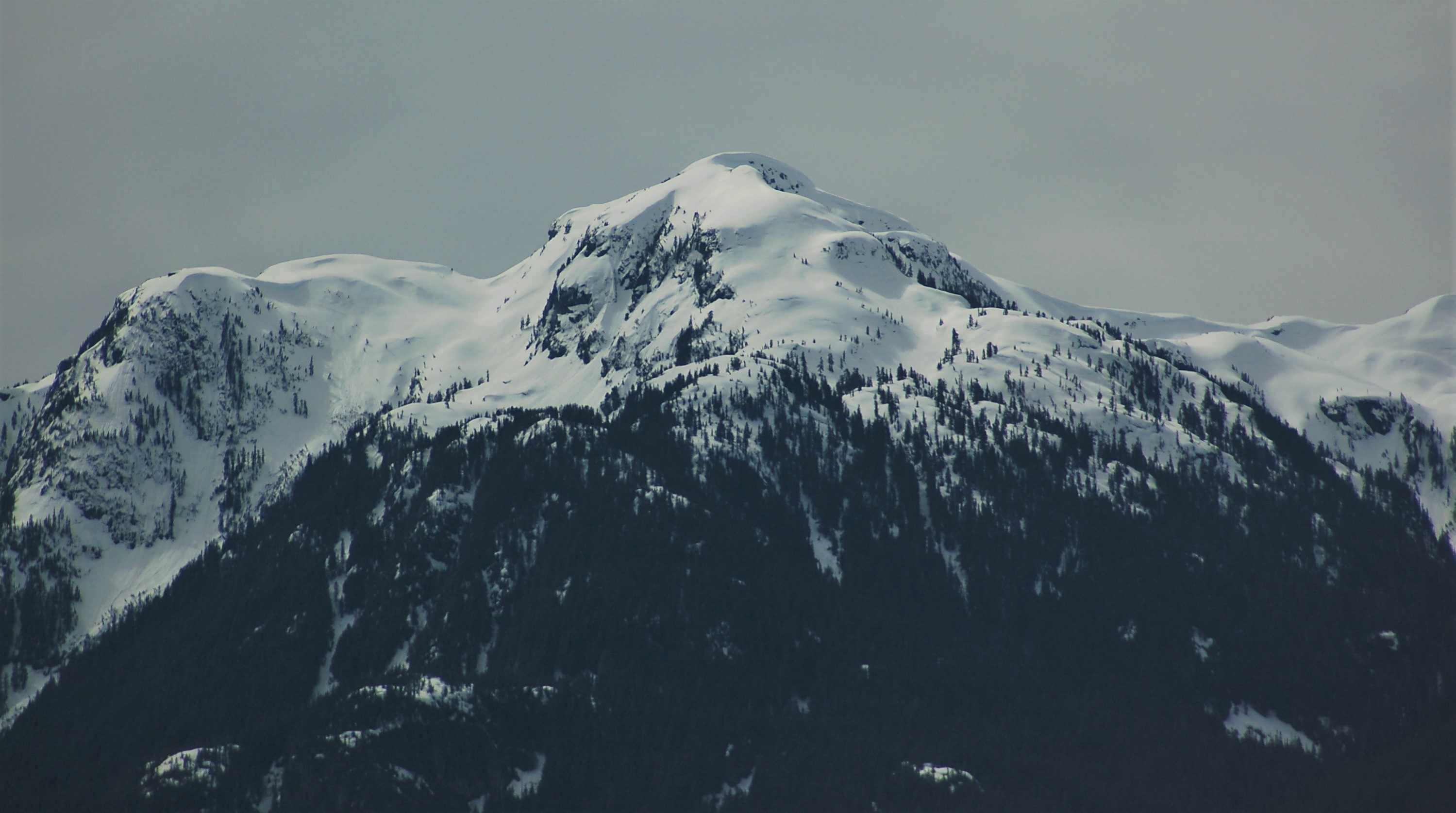
Mount Thyestes

== See also ==
- Geography of British Columbia
- Geology of British Columbia
