= Lydia Mountain =

Mountain in British Columbia, Canada

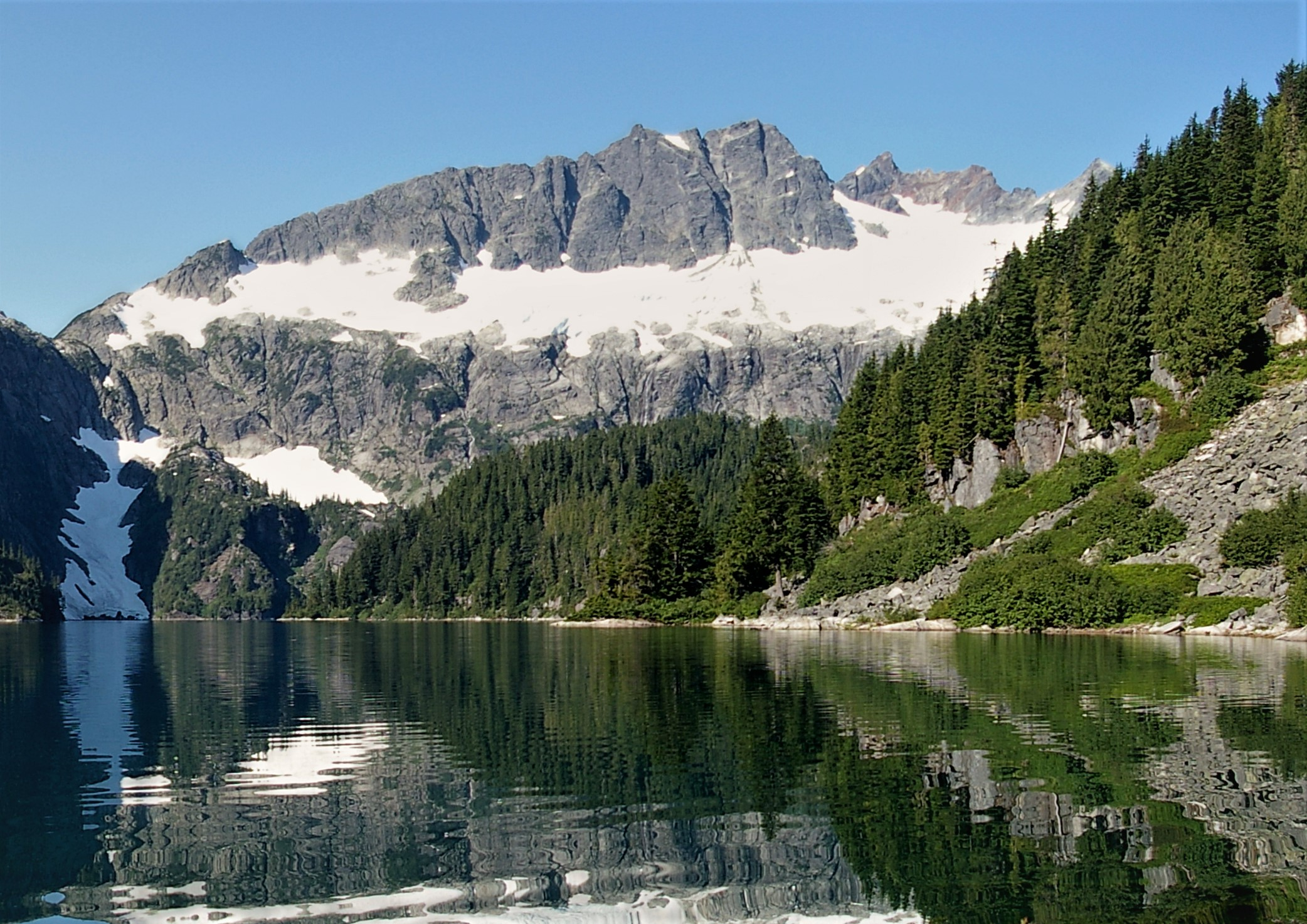
- Lydia Mountain, east aspect reflected in Lake Lovely Water, and featuring the Crescent Glacier

Highest point
- Elevation: 2,100 m (6,890 ft)
- Prominence: 85 m (279 ft)
- Parent peak: Mount Tantalus (2603 m)
- Isolation: 0.49 km (0.30 mi)
- Listing: Mountains of British Columbia
- Coordinates: 49°46′31″N 123°17′36″W

Naming
- Etymology: Lydia

Geography
- Location within British Columbia Location within Canada
- Interactive map of Lydia Mountain
- Country: Canada
- Province: British Columbia
- District: New Westminster Land District
- Protected area: Tantalus Provincial Park
- Parent range: Tantalus Range; Pacific Coast Ranges
- Topo map: NTS 92G14 Cheakamus River

Climbing
- First ascent: 1914

Lydia Mountain is a 2,100-metre (6,890-foot) summit located in the Tantalus Range, in Tantalus Provincial Park, in southwestern British Columbia, Canada. It is situated 14.5 km (9 mi) northwest of Squamish, and 5.46 km (3 mi) south-southeast of Mount Tantalus, which is the highest peak in the Tantalus Range. The nearest higher neighbor is The Red Tusk, 0.5 km (0 mi) to the west, and Mount Niobe lies 2.17 km (1 mi) to the east-southeast. Lake Lovely Water lies below the eastern slope of the peak and precipitation runoff from the peak drains east to the Squamish River, and west to the Clowhom River via Red Tusk Creek. Topographic relief is significant as Lydia Mountain rises 1,400 meters (4,600 feet) above Red Tusk Creek in approximately three kilometers (two miles). The mountain's name was officially adopted on June 6, 1957, by the Geographical Names Board of Canada. The mountain was named for mythic Lydia, of which Tantalus was a primordial ruler in Greek mythology. Several peaks in the Tantalus Range are named in association with Tantalus. The first ascent of Lydia Mountain was made in 1914 by Basil Darling and Allan Morkill.

== Climate ==
Based on the Köppen climate classification, Lydia Mountain is located in the marine west coast climate zone of western North America. Most weather fronts originate in the Pacific Ocean, and travel east toward the Coast Mountains where they are forced upward by the range (Orographic lift), causing them to drop their moisture in the form of rain or snowfall. As a result, the Coast Mountains experience high precipitation, especially during the winter months in the form of snowfall. Temperatures can drop below −20 °C with wind chill factors below −30 °C. This climate supports the Crescent Glacier on the east and north slopes of Lydia. The months July through September offer the most favorable weather for climbing Lydia Mountain.

== Gallery ==
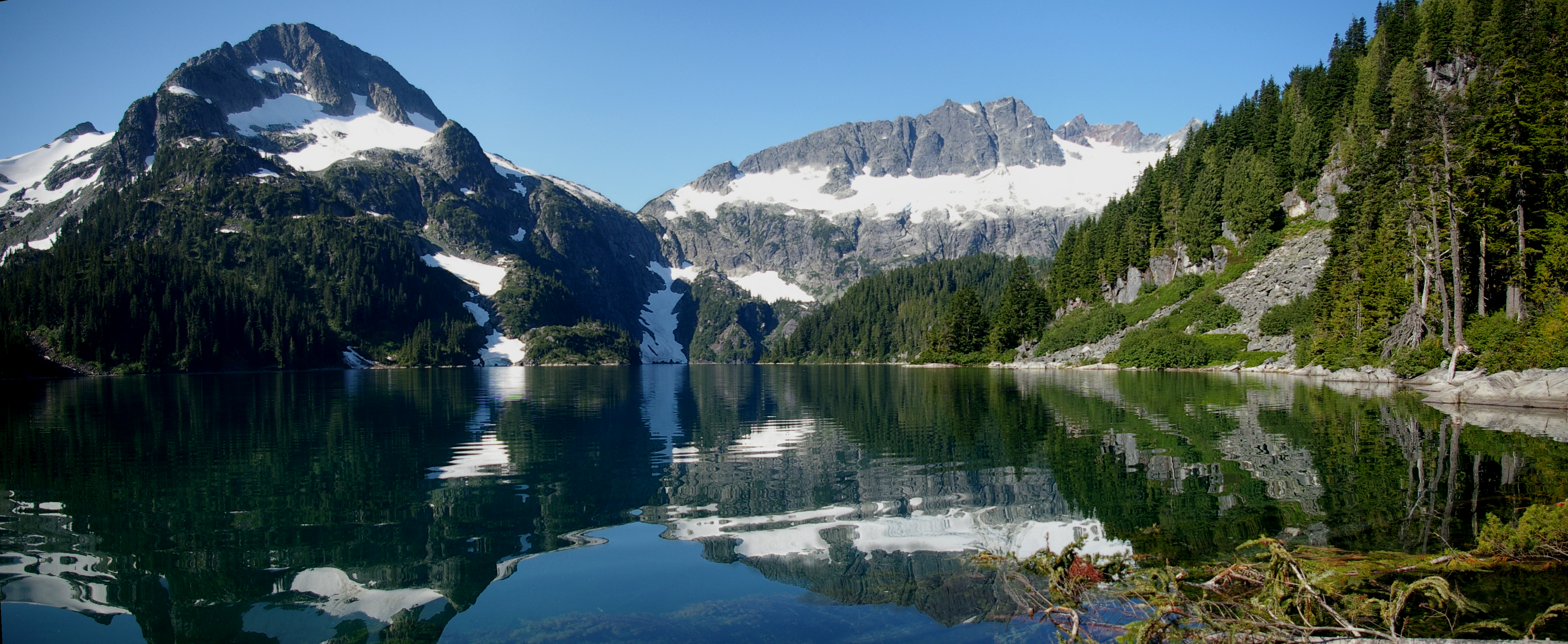
Mount Niobe (left) and Lydia Mountain reflected in Lake Lovely Water

== See also ==
- Geography of British Columbia
- Geology of British Columbia
