= Serratus Mountain =

Mountain in British Columbia, Canada

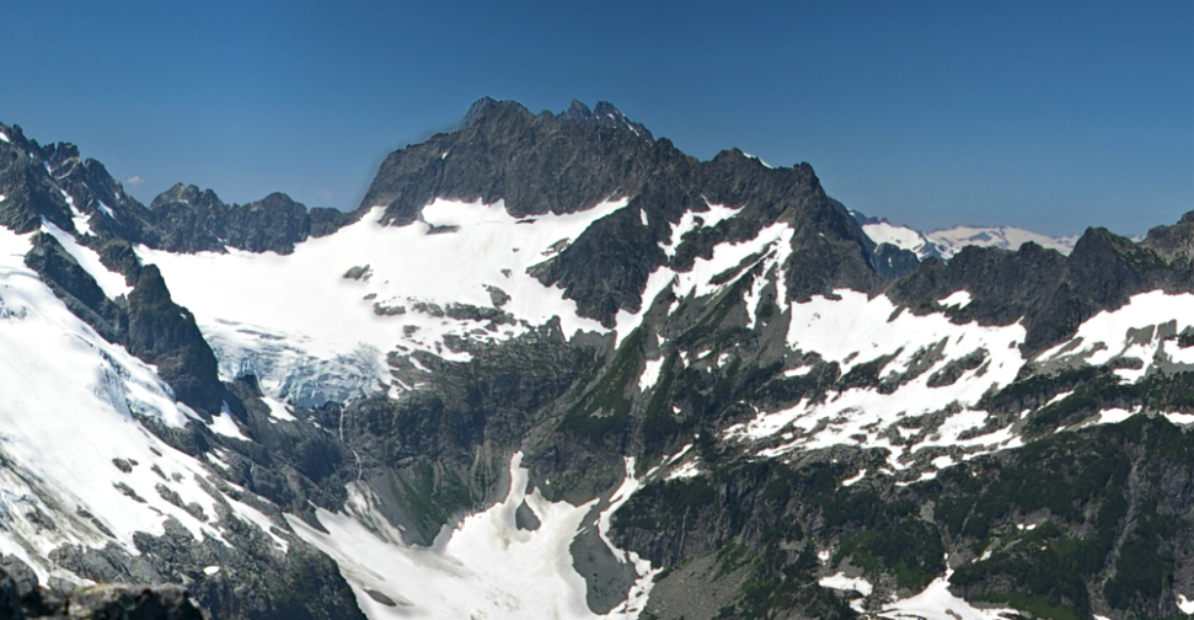
- Serratus Mountain seen from Mount Niobe

Highest point
- Elevation: 2,321 m (7,615 ft)
- Prominence: 291 m (955 ft)
- Coordinates: 49°47′34″N 123°18′7″W

Geography
- Location within British Columbia Location within Canada
- Interactive map of Serratus Mountain
- Location: British Columbia, Canada
- District: New Westminster Land District
- Parent range: Tantalus Range, Coast Mountains
- Topo map: NTS 92G14 Cheakamus River

Climbing
- First ascent: 1911 B. Darling; S. Davies; A. Morkill
- Easiest route: Class 3,4 (scrambling)

Serratus Mountain is a jagged, ridge-like mountain between Mount Tantalus (North) and Lake Lovely Water (South). Like most other peaks in the Tantalus Range, it is composed of loose rock. Most routes here are scrambles. The mountain is a standard single-day destination from the Jim Haberl hut.

== Climate ==
Based on the Köppen climate classification, Serratus Mountain is located in the marine west coast climate zone of western North America. Most weather fronts originate in the Pacific Ocean, and travel east toward the Coast Mountains where they are forced upward by the range (Orographic lift), causing them to drop their moisture in the form of rain or snowfall. As a result, the Coast Mountains experience high precipitation, especially during the winter months in the form of snowfall. Temperatures can drop below −20 °C with wind chill factors below −30 °C. The months July through September offer the most favorable weather for climbing Serratus.

== Gallery ==
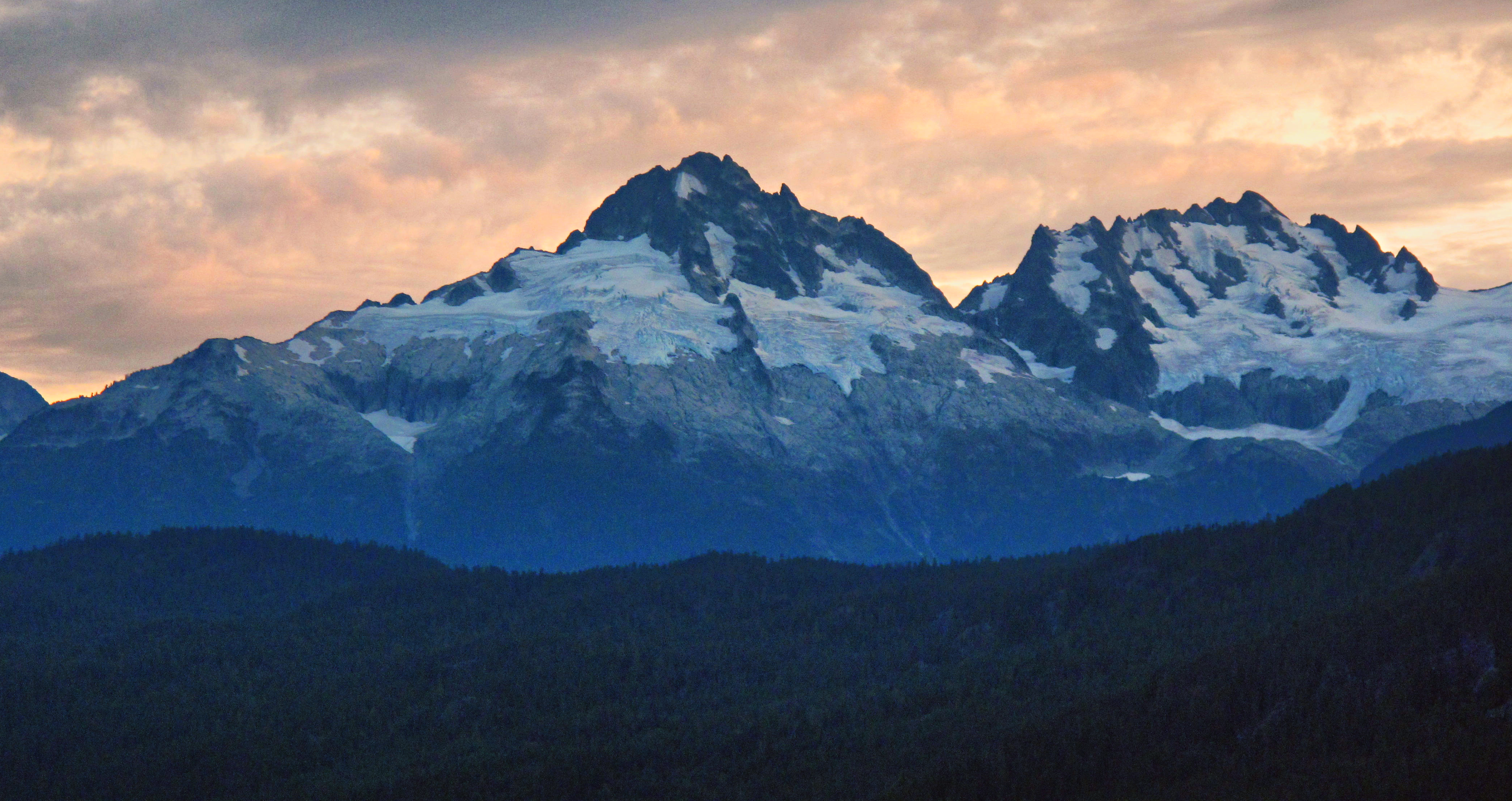
Alpha Mountain centered and Serratus to right

== Nearby ==
- Mount Tantalus
- Alpha Mountain
- Mount Dione
- Lake Lovely Water
- Jim Haberl hut
