= Mount Sedgwick (British Columbia) =

Mountain in British Columbia, Canada

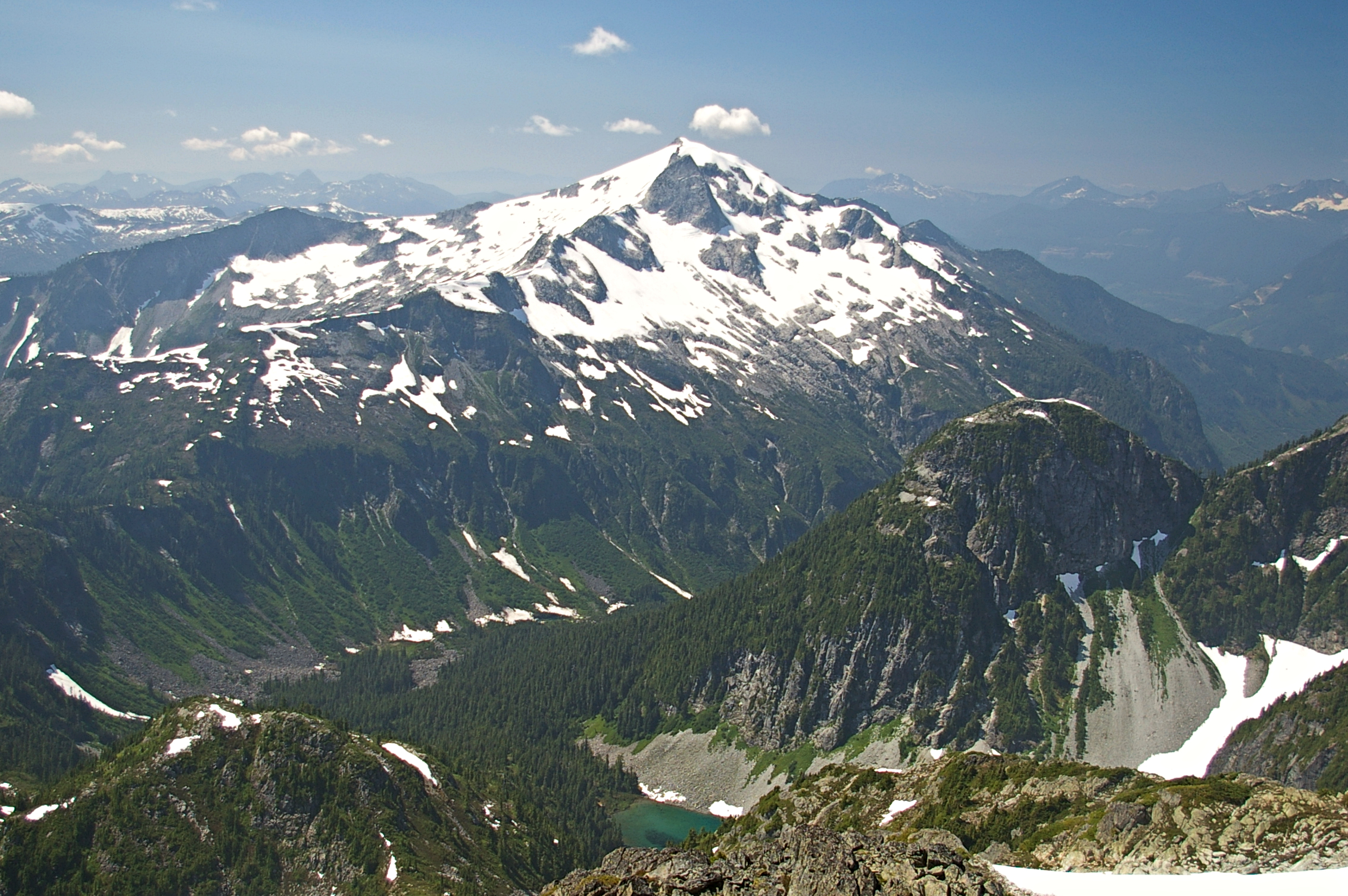
- Mount Sedgwick, northeast aspect

Highest point
- Elevation: 2,082 m (6,831 ft)
- Prominence: 802 m (2,631 ft)
- Parent peak: Mount Tantalus (2608 m)
- Listing: Mountains of British Columbia
- Coordinates: 49°44′37″N 123°20′14″W

Geography
- Location within British Columbia Location within Canada
- Interactive map of Mount Sedgwick
- Country: Canada
- Province: British Columbia
- District: New Westminster Land District
- Protected area: Tantalus Provincial Park
- Parent range: Tantalus Range; Coast Ranges
- Topo map: NTS 92G11 Squamish

Climbing
- First ascent: 1909 by H. Dowler
- Easiest route: Scramble

Mount Sedgwick is a prominent 2,082-metre (6,831-foot) mountain summit located in the Tantalus Range of southwestern British Columbia, Canada. It is situated 13 km (8 mi) west-northwest of Squamish, and 8 km (5 mi) south of Mount Tantalus, which is the highest peak in the Tantalus Range. Its nearest higher peak is The Red Tusk, 4.4 km (3 mi) to the northeast. Precipitation runoff from the peak drains west into tributaries of the Clowhom River, and east into Mill Creek which empties into Howe Sound. The first ascent of the mountain was made in 1909 by H. Dowler. The mountain is named for Adam Sedgwick (1785–1873), one of the founders of modern geology who accompanied Sir Roderick Murchison on geological tours in Canada. The mountain's name was officially adopted on May 3, 1951, by the Geographical Names Board of Canada.

== Climate ==
Based on the Köppen climate classification, Mount Sedgwick is located in the marine west coast climate zone of western North America. Most weather fronts originate in the Pacific Ocean, and travel east toward the Coast Mountains where they are forced upward by the range (Orographic lift), causing them to drop their moisture in the form of rain or snowfall. As a result, the Coast Mountains experience high precipitation, especially during the winter months in the form of snowfall. Temperatures can drop below −20 °C with wind chill factors below −30 °C. The months July through September offer the most favorable weather for climbing Mount Sedgwick.

== Gallery ==
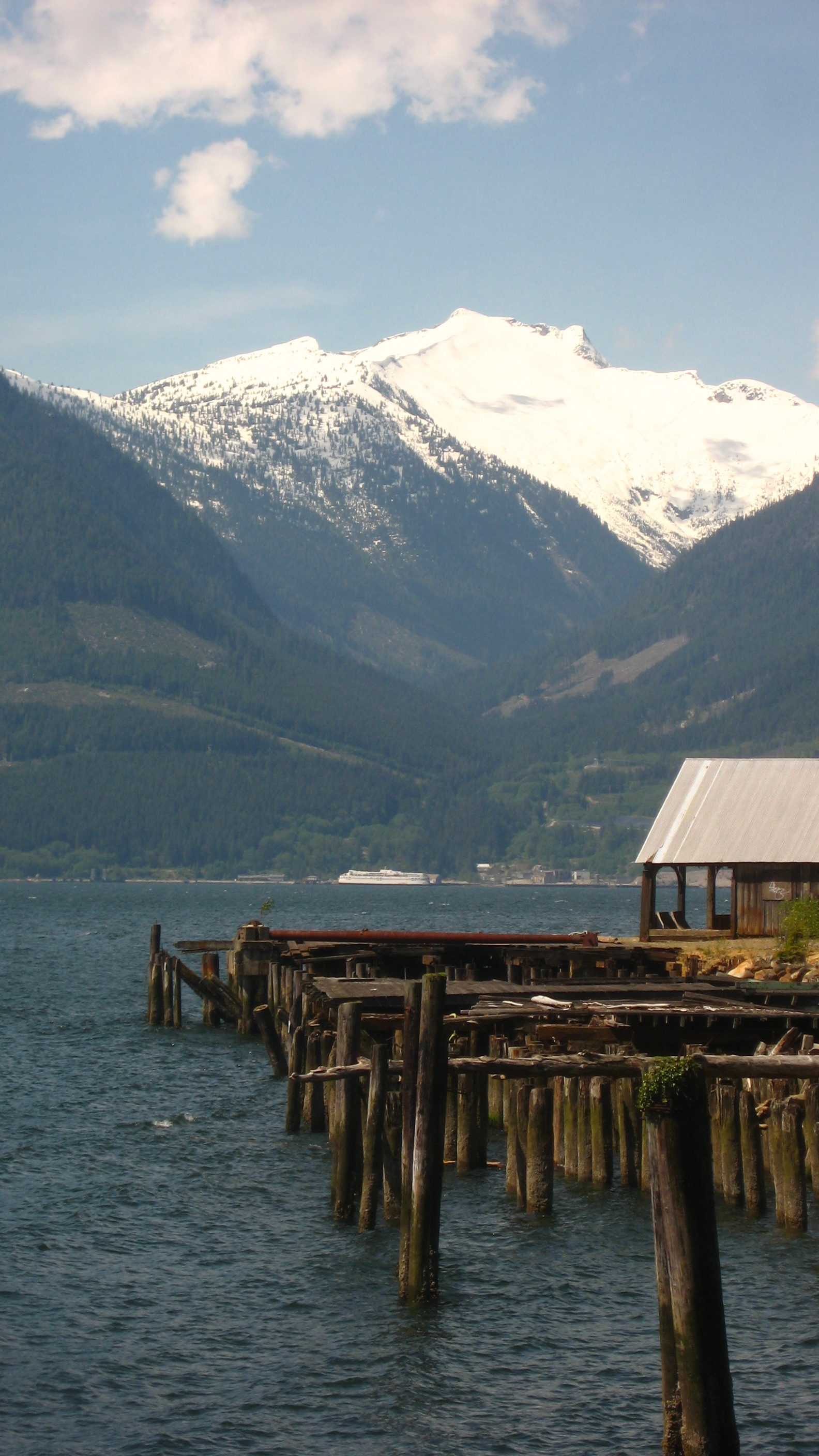
Mount Sedgwick from Britannia Beach

== See also ==
- Geography of British Columbia
- Geology of British Columbia
