= Darling Peak =

Mountain in the country of Canada

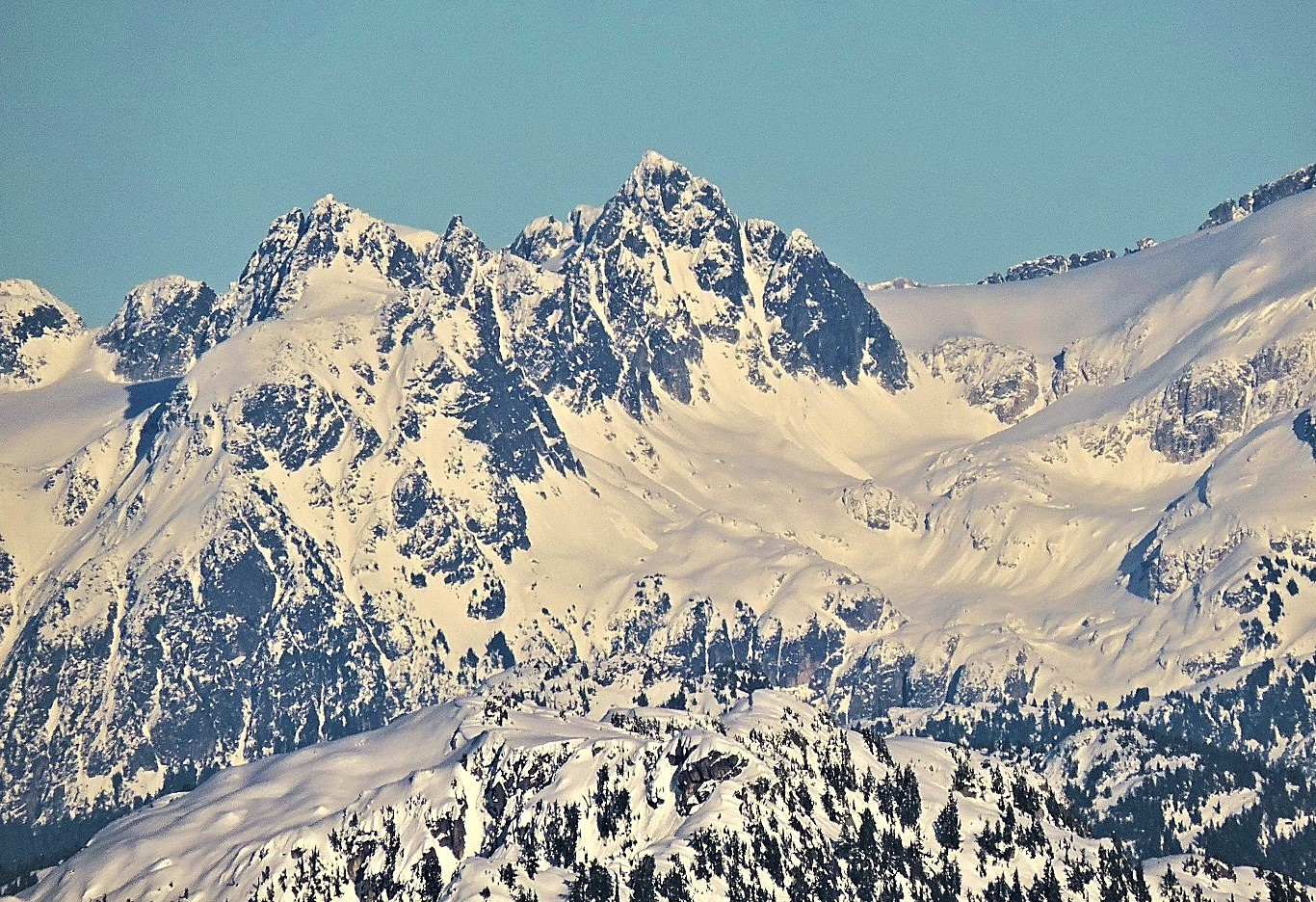
- South aspect

Highest point
- Elevation: 2,310 m (7,580 ft)
- Prominence: 142 m (466 ft)
- Parent peak: Mamquam Mountain (2,588m)
- Isolation: 0.926 km (0.575 mi)
- Listing: Mountains of British Columbia
- Coordinates: 49°47′13″N 122°52′45″W

Geography
- Location within British Columbia Location within Canada
- Interactive map of Darling Peak
- Country: Canada
- Province: British Columbia
- District: New Westminster Land District
- Protected area: Garibaldi Provincial Park
- Parent range: Garibaldi Ranges; Coast Mountains
- Topo map: NTS 92G15 Mamquam Mountain

Darling Peak is a 2,310-metre (7,580-foot) mountain summit located in British Columbia, Canada.

== Description ==
Darling Peak is set within Garibaldi Provincial Park and is part of the Garibaldi Ranges of the Coast Mountains. It is situated along the western edge of the Mamquam Icefield, 55 km (34 mi) north of Vancouver and 2.5 km (2 mi) northwest of line parent Mamquam Mountain. Precipitation runoff from the peak drains to Skookum Creek, thence Mamquam River. Topographic relief is significant as the summit rises over 900 meters (2,953 feet) above Skookum Creek in four kilometers (2.5 miles).

== Etymology ==
The landform was named by the Garibaldi Park Board (circa 1928) after Basil S. Darling (1885–1962), a pioneering climber in the area. He was born in Toronto; went to Vancouver in 1908; relocated to Toronto in 1916; and retired to Victoria in 1926. Basil Darling is credited with the first ascents of Cathedral Mountain (1908), Sky Pilot Mountain (1910), Mount Tantalus (1911), Atwell Peak (1911), Serratus Mountain (1911), Golden Ears (1911), Alpha Mountain (1914), Lydia Mountain (1914), and The Red Tusk (1914).

The landform's toponym was officially adopted September 2, 1930, by the Geographical Names Board of Canada.

== Climate ==
Based on the Köppen climate classification, Darling Peak is located in the marine west coast climate zone of western North America. Most weather fronts originate in the Pacific Ocean, and travel east toward the Coast Mountains where they are forced upward by the range (Orographic lift), causing them to drop their moisture in the form of rain or snowfall. As a result, the Coast Mountains experience high precipitation, especially during the winter months in the form of snowfall. Winter temperatures can drop below −20 °C with wind chill factors below −30 °C. This climate supports the Tyee Glacier on the north slope and the Mamquam Icefield on the east side.

== Gallery ==
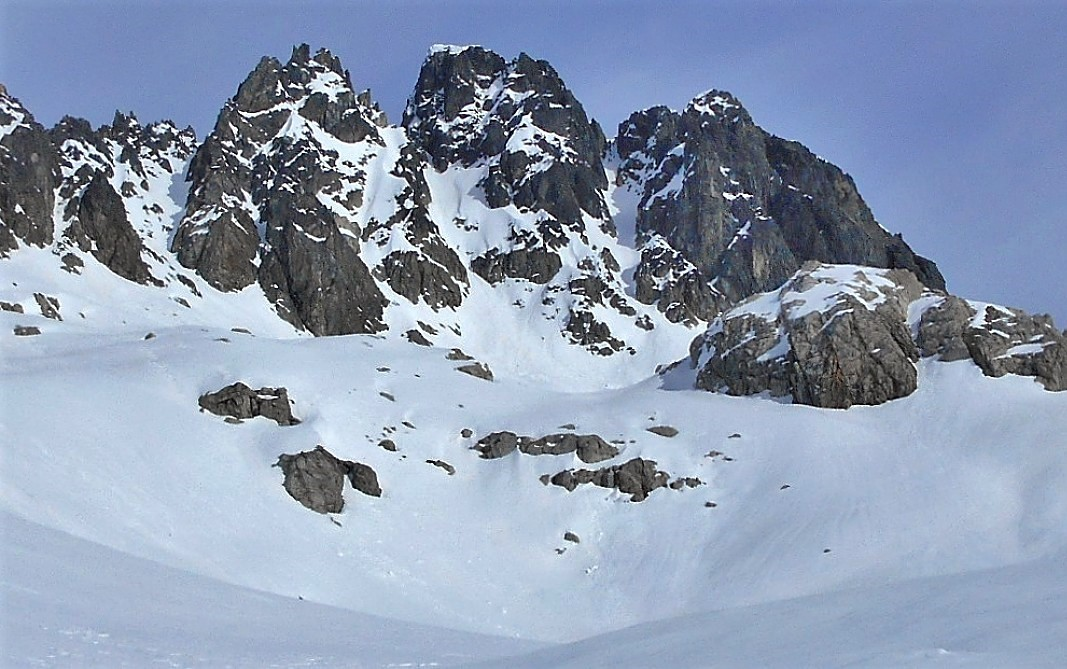
Below the south side of Darling Peak

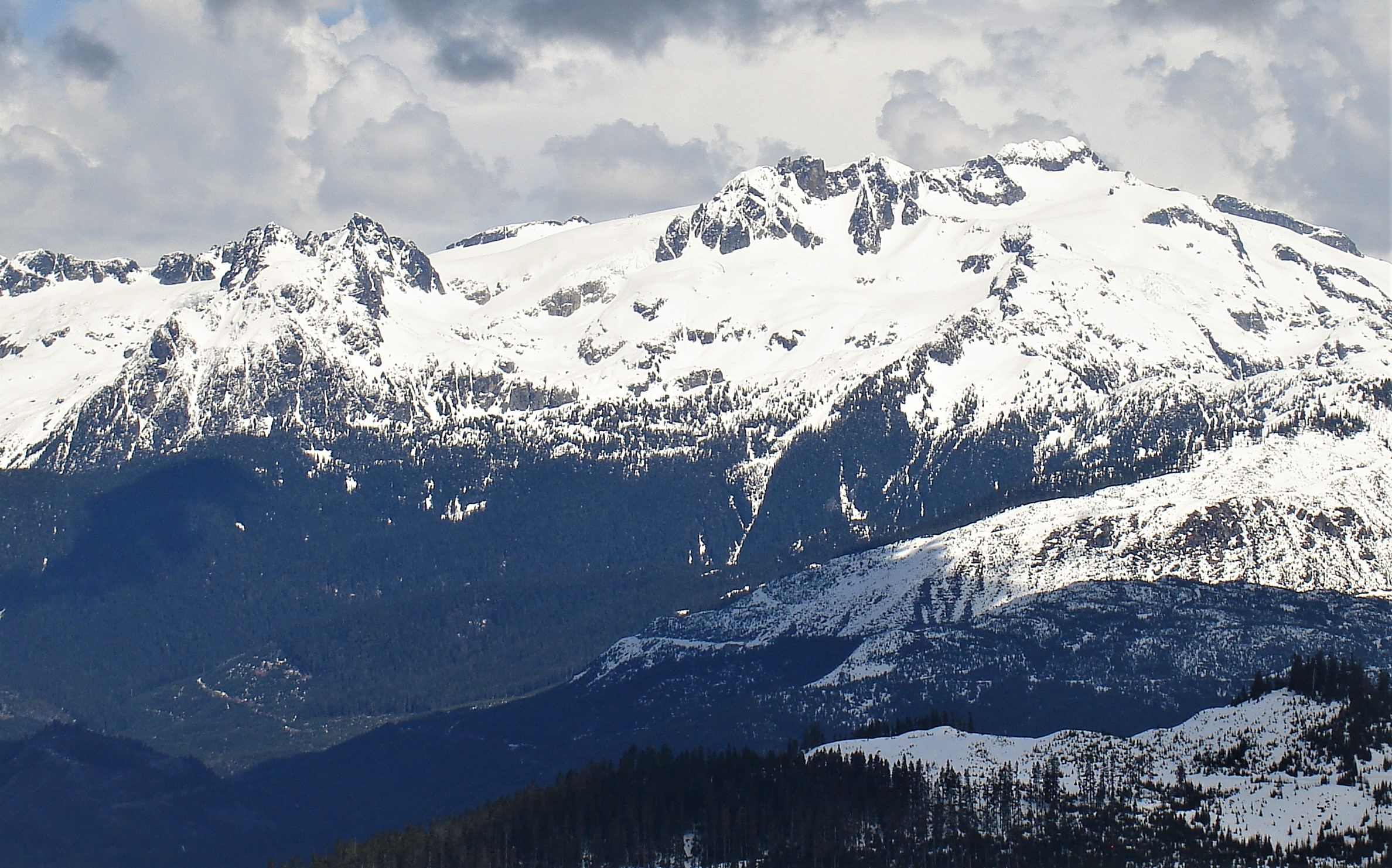
Darling Peak (left) and Delusion Peak/Mamquam Mountain (right)

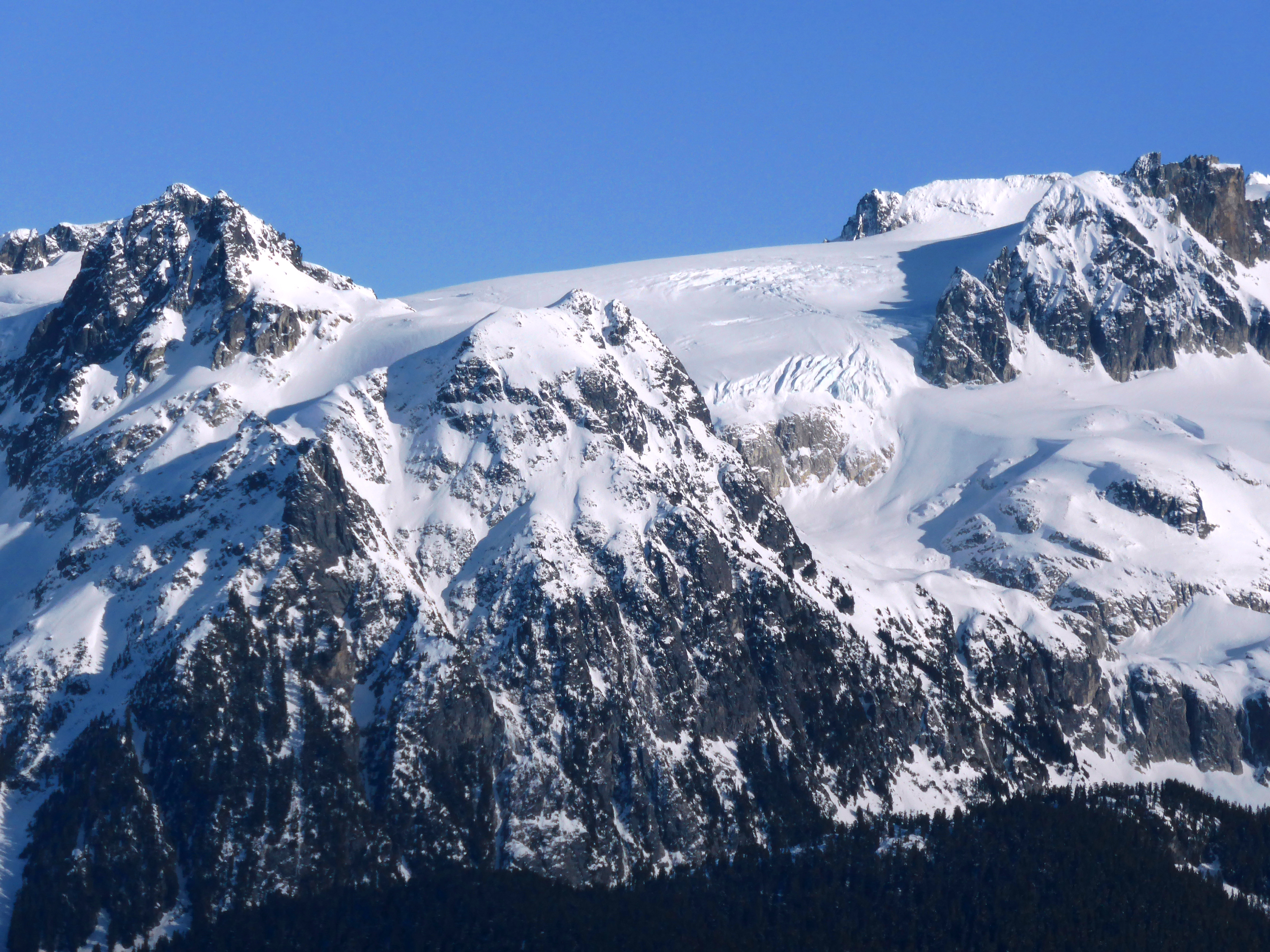
Darling Peak (left) and Delusion SW1 (right) seen from Elfin Lakes

== See also ==
- Geography of British Columbia
