= Mount Dione =

Mountain in British Columbia, Canada

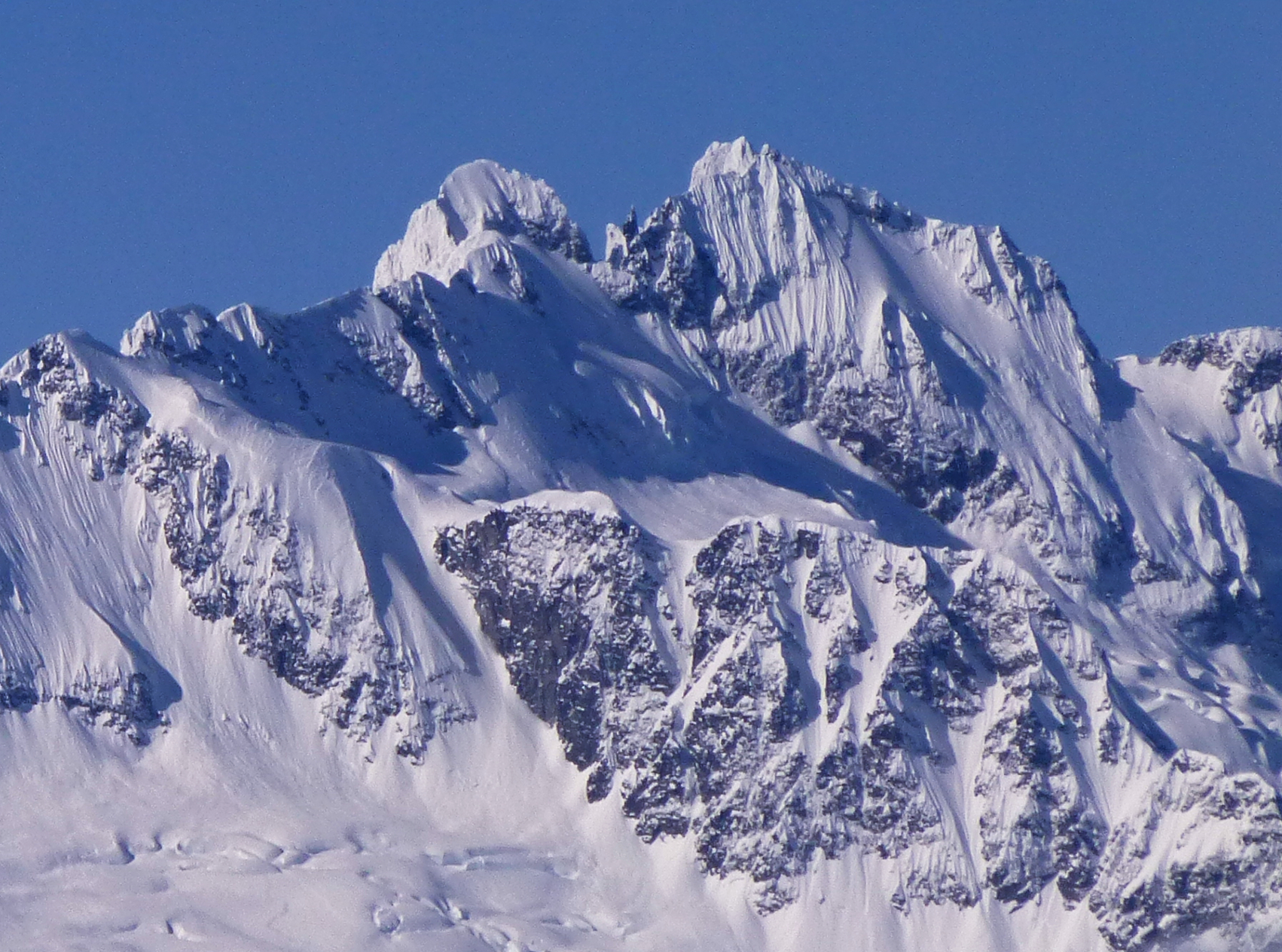
- Mount Dione (left) with Mount Tantalus

Highest point
- Elevation: 2,589 m (8,494 ft)
- Prominence: 129 m (423 ft)
- Parent peak: Mount Tantalus (2608 m)
- Listing: Mountains of British Columbia
- Coordinates: 49°48′57″N 123°19′45″W

Geography
- Location within British Columbia Location within Canada
- Interactive map of Mount Dione
- Location: Tantalus Provincial Park; British Columbia, Canada
- District: New Westminster Land District
- Parent range: Tantalus Range; Pacific Coast Ranges
- Topo map: NTS 92G14 Cheakamus River

Climbing
- First ascent: 1916 by J. Fyles and T. Fyles
- Easiest route: Scrambling Southeast Ridge

Mount Dione is a 2,589-metre (8,494-foot) summit located in the Tantalus Range, in Tantalus Provincial Park, in southwestern British Columbia, Canada. It is situated 17 km (11 mi) northwest of Squamish, and 0.24 km (0 mi) north of Mount Tantalus, which is its nearest higher peak and the highest peak in the Tantalus Range. The Dione Glacier lies on the southern slope, and the Rumbling Glacier lies to the northeast. Precipitation runoff from the peak drains east into tributaries of the Squamish River, or west into tributaries of the Clowhom River. The first ascent of the mountain was made in 1916 by Tom Fyles and his brother, John Fyles, via the southeast ridge. The mountain names in the Tantalus Range have a Greek mythology theme, and Mount Dione was named for Dione, the wife of Tantalus. The mountain's name was submitted by Neal Carter of the British Columbia Mountaineering Club, and was officially adopted on June 6, 1957, by the Geographical Names Board of Canada.

== Climate ==
Based on the Köppen climate classification, Mount Dione is located in the marine west coast climate zone of western North America. Most weather fronts originate in the Pacific Ocean, and travel east toward the Coast Mountains where they are forced upward by the range (Orographic lift), causing them to drop their moisture in the form of rain or snowfall. As a result, the Coast Mountains experience high precipitation, especially during the winter months in the form of snowfall. Temperatures can drop below −20 °C with wind chill factors below −30 °C. The months July through September offer the most favorable weather for climbing Dione.

== Climbing Routes ==
Established rock climbing routes on Mount Dione:

- Southeast Ridge - class 3 First Ascent 1916
- West Face - class 5.10b FA 1996
- West Buttress - class 5.10c FA 2002

== Gallery ==
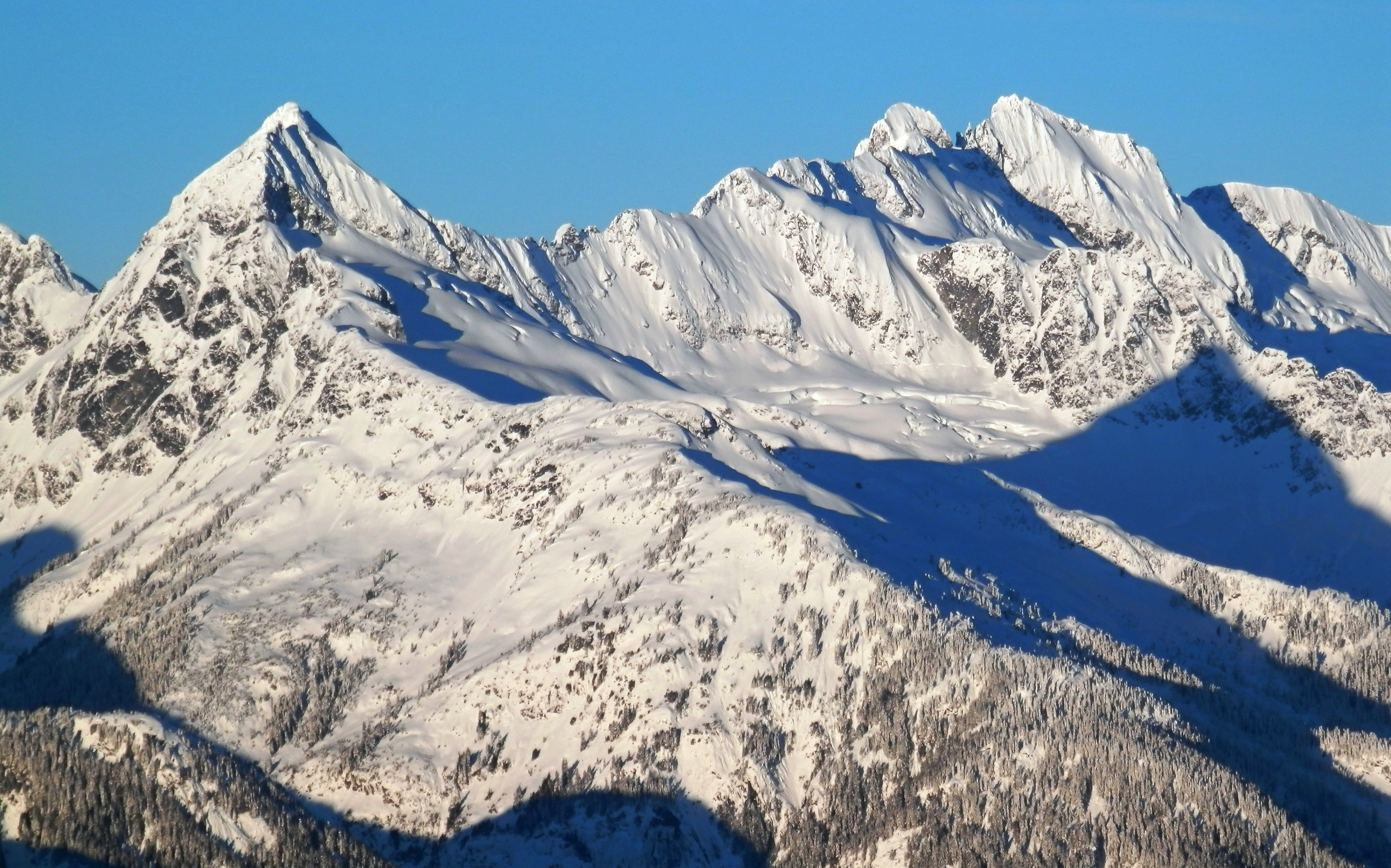
Alpha Mountain (left), Dione and Tantalus to right, as seen from the Sea to Sky Highway

== See also ==
- Mount Niobe (Niobe, daughter of Dione)
- Geography of British Columbia
- Geology of British Columbia
