= Omega Mountain =

Mountain in British Columbia, Canada

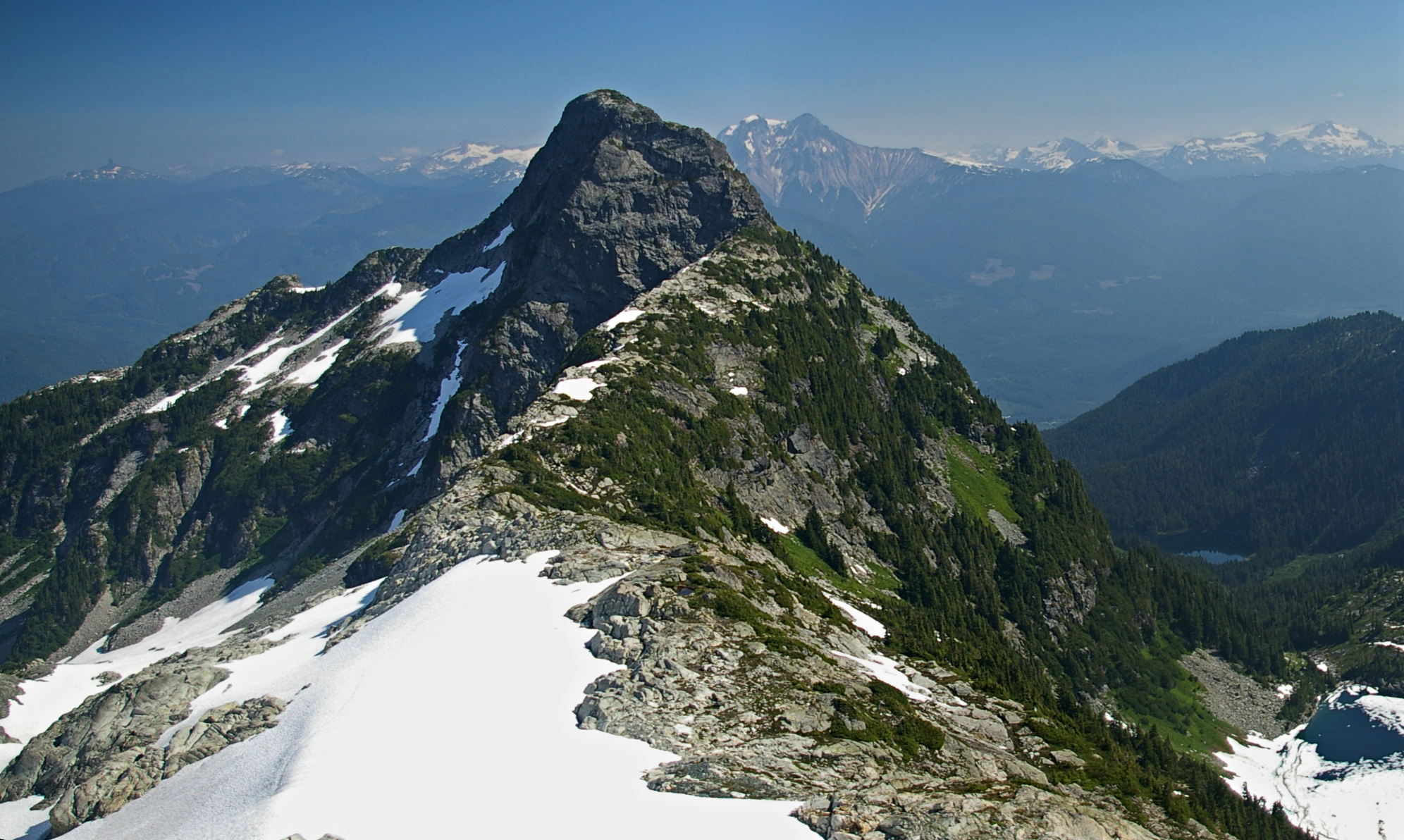
- Omega Mountain, west aspect

Highest point
- Elevation: 1,918 m (6,293 ft)
- Prominence: 228 m (748 ft)
- Parent peak: Mount Niobe (2021 m)
- Listing: Mountains of British Columbia
- Coordinates: 49°46′17″N 123°14′28″W

Geography
- Location within British Columbia Location within Canada
- Interactive map of Omega Mountain
- Location: Tantalus Provincial Park; British Columbia, Canada
- District: New Westminster Land District
- Parent range: Tantalus Range; Coast Ranges
- Topo map: NTS 92G14 Cheakamus River

Climbing
- First ascent: 1916 by J. Fyles and T. Fyles
- Easiest route: Scrambling

Omega Mountain is a 1,918-metre (6,293-foot) summit located in the Tantalus Range, in Tantalus Provincial Park, in southwestern British Columbia, Canada. It is situated 10 km (6 mi) northwest of Squamish, and 8.2 km (5 mi) southeast of Mount Tantalus, which is the highest peak in the Tantalus Range. Its nearest higher peak is Mount Pelops, 1.7 km (1 mi) to the west. Lake Lovely Water lies below the northwestern slope of the peak with Alpha Mountain on the opposite side of the lake. Precipitation runoff from the peak drains into tributaries of the Squamish River. The first ascent of the mountain was made in 1916 by Tom Fyles and his brother, John Fyles. The mountain's name comes from Omega, in keeping with nearby peaks being named for Greek alphabet letters, namely Alpha and Iota mountains. Its name was officially adopted on June 6, 1957, by the Geographical Names Board of Canada.

== Climate ==
Based on the Köppen climate classification, Omega Mountain is located in the marine west coast climate zone of western North America. Most weather fronts originate in the Pacific Ocean, and travel east toward the Coast Mountains where they are forced upward by the range (Orographic lift), causing them to drop their moisture in the form of rain or snowfall. As a result, the Coast Mountains experience high precipitation, especially during the winter months in the form of snowfall. Temperatures can drop below −20 °C with wind chill factors below −30 °C. This climate supports a small glacier remnant on the northeast slope of Omega. The months July through September offer the most favorable weather for climbing Omega.

== Climbing Routes ==
Established rock climbing routes on Omega Mountain:

- West Ridge - class 3-5
- North Side - class 3-5

== Gallery ==
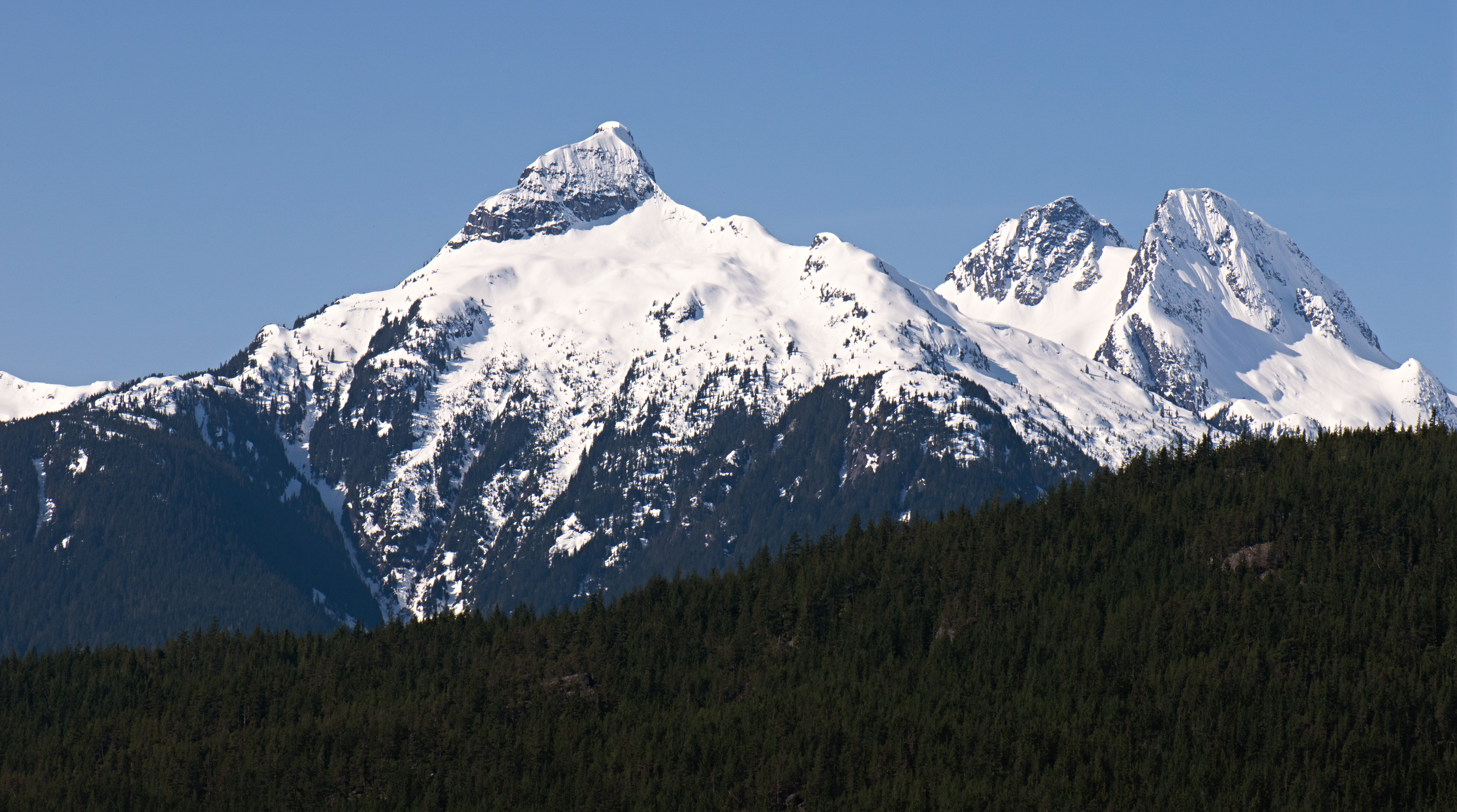
Omega Mountain as seen from the Sea to Sky Highway with Pelops and Niobe to right

== See also ==
- Geography of British Columbia
- Geology of British Columbia
