= The Red Tusk =

Mountain in British Columbia, Canada

- Location within British Columbia

Highest point
- Elevation: 2,147 m (7,044 ft)
- Prominence: 157 m (515 ft)
- Coordinates: 49°46′34.0″N 123°18′00.0″W

Geography
- Location: British Columbia, Canada
- District: New Westminster Land District
- Parent range: Tantalus Range
- Topo map: NTS 92G14 Cheakamus River

Climbing
- First ascent: 1914 Basil Darling; Allan Morkill

The Red Tusk is a mountain in the Tantalus Range of the Pacific Ranges in southwestern British Columbia, Canada, located 5 km (3.1 mi) southeast of Mount Tantalus and 11 km (6.8 mi) west of Cheekye.

The Red Tusk gets its name from the reddish metamorphic rock that forms the mountain. It has a similar appearance to the smaller, but more famous Black Tusk in the Garibaldi Ranges further east.
