= Alpha Mountain =

Mountain in British Columbia, Canada

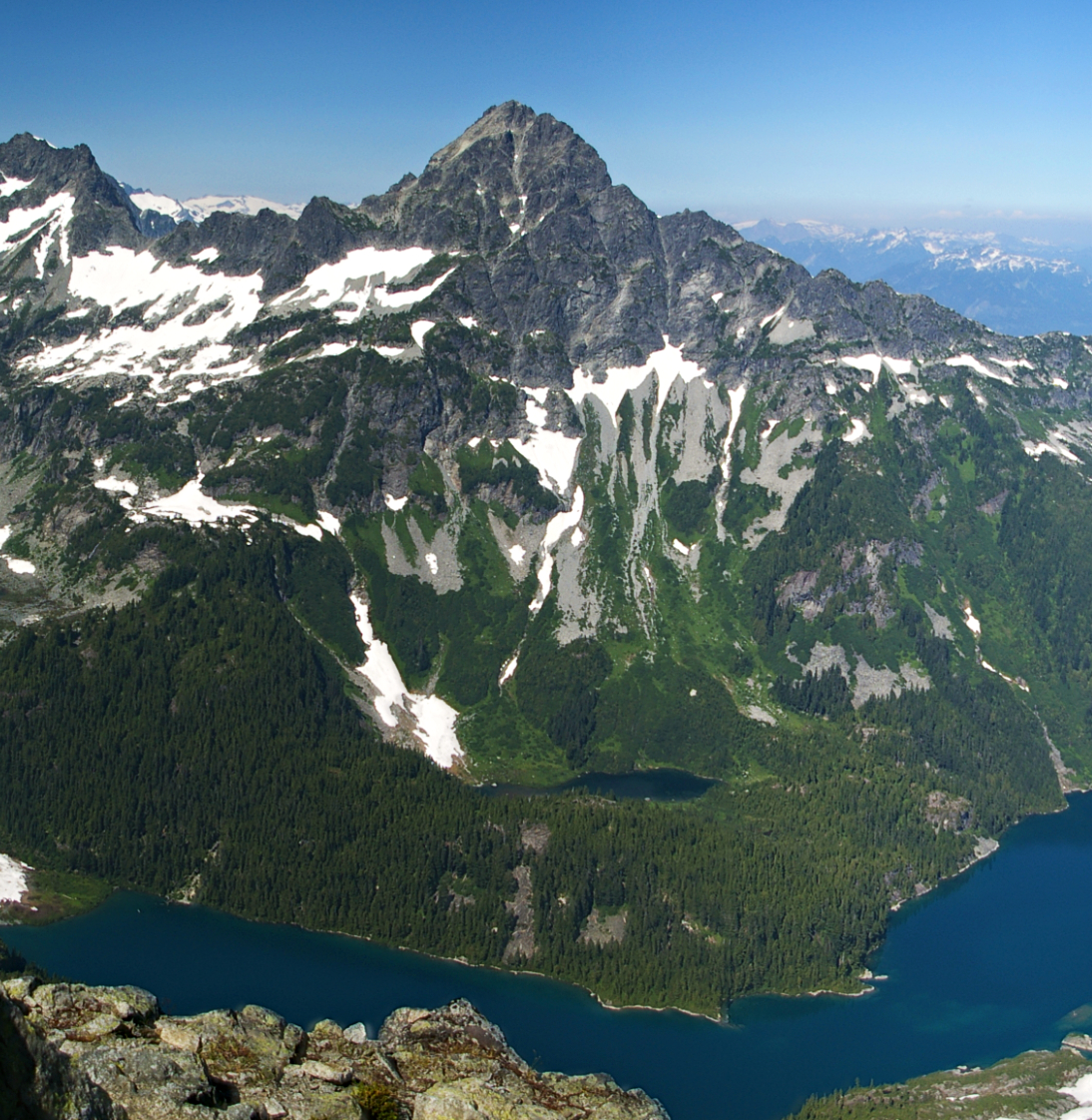
- Alpha Mountain above Lake Lovely Water (as seen from Mount Niobe)

Highest point
- Elevation: 2,302 m (7,552 ft)
- Prominence: 372 m (1,220 ft)
- Parent peak: Serratus Mountain (2321 m)
- Listing: Mountains of British Columbia
- Coordinates: 49°47′44″N 123°16′33″W

Geography
- Location within British Columbia Location within Canada
- Interactive map of Alpha Mountain
- Country: Canada
- Province: British Columbia
- District: New Westminster Land District
- Protected area: Tantalus Provincial Park
- Parent range: Tantalus Range; Coast Ranges
- Topo map: NTS 92G14 Cheakamus River

Climbing
- First ascent: 1914 by Basil Darling and A. Morkill
- Easiest route: Scramble via SW Ridge

Alpha Mountain is a 2,302-metre (7,552-foot) summit located in the Tantalus Range, in Tantalus Provincial Park, in southwestern British Columbia, Canada. It is situated 14 km (8.7 mi) northwest of Squamish, and 4.6 km (2.9 mi) southeast of Mount Tantalus, which is the highest peak in the Tantalus Range. Its nearest higher peak is Serratus Mountain, 1.9 km (1.2 mi) to the west. The Serratus Glacier lies to the west of Alpha, unnamed glaciers lie on the northern and eastern slopes, and Lake Lovely Water lies below the south slope. Precipitation runoff from the peak drains into tributaries of the Squamish River.

== History ==
The first ascent of the mountain was made in 1914 by Basil Darling and Alan Morkill via the southwest ridge. These two named the peak shortly after they made the ascent, alluding to Alpha, which is the first letter of the Greek alphabet, because the peak is the first (southeast) summit of the Alpha-Serratus-Tantalus-Zenith Ridge, and also because of its form. The mountain's toponym was officially adopted on June 6, 1957, by the Geographical Names Board of Canada.

== Climate ==
Based on the Köppen climate classification, Alpha Mountain is located in the marine west coast climate zone of western North America. Most weather fronts originate in the Pacific Ocean, and travel east toward the Coast Mountains where they are forced upward by the range (Orographic lift), causing them to drop their moisture in the form of rain or snowfall. As a result, the Coast Mountains experience high precipitation, especially during the winter months in the form of snowfall. Winter temperatures can drop below −20 °C with wind chill factors below −30 °C. The months July through September offer the most favorable weather for climbing Alpha.

== Climbing Routes ==
Established rock-climbing routes on Alpha Mountain:

- Southwest Ridge - class 3 First Ascent 1914
- East Ridge - class 5.8 FA 1916
- Northeast Ridge - class 4-5 FA 1968
- Northwest Ridge - class 4-5 FA 1969
- North Buttress - class mid-5 FA 1981
- South Face - class 4-5

== Gallery ==
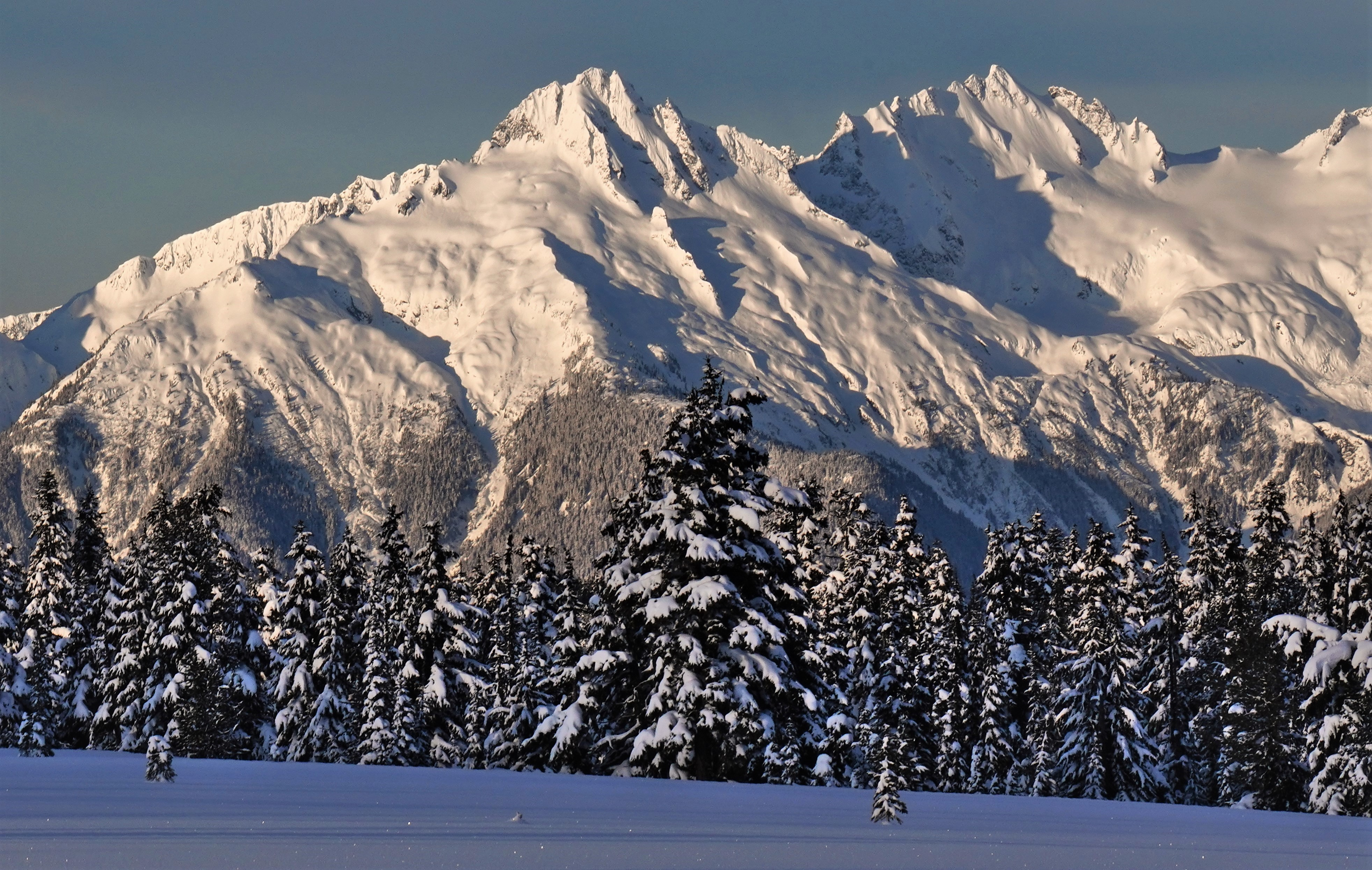
Alpha Mountain (left) and Serratus Mountain (right).

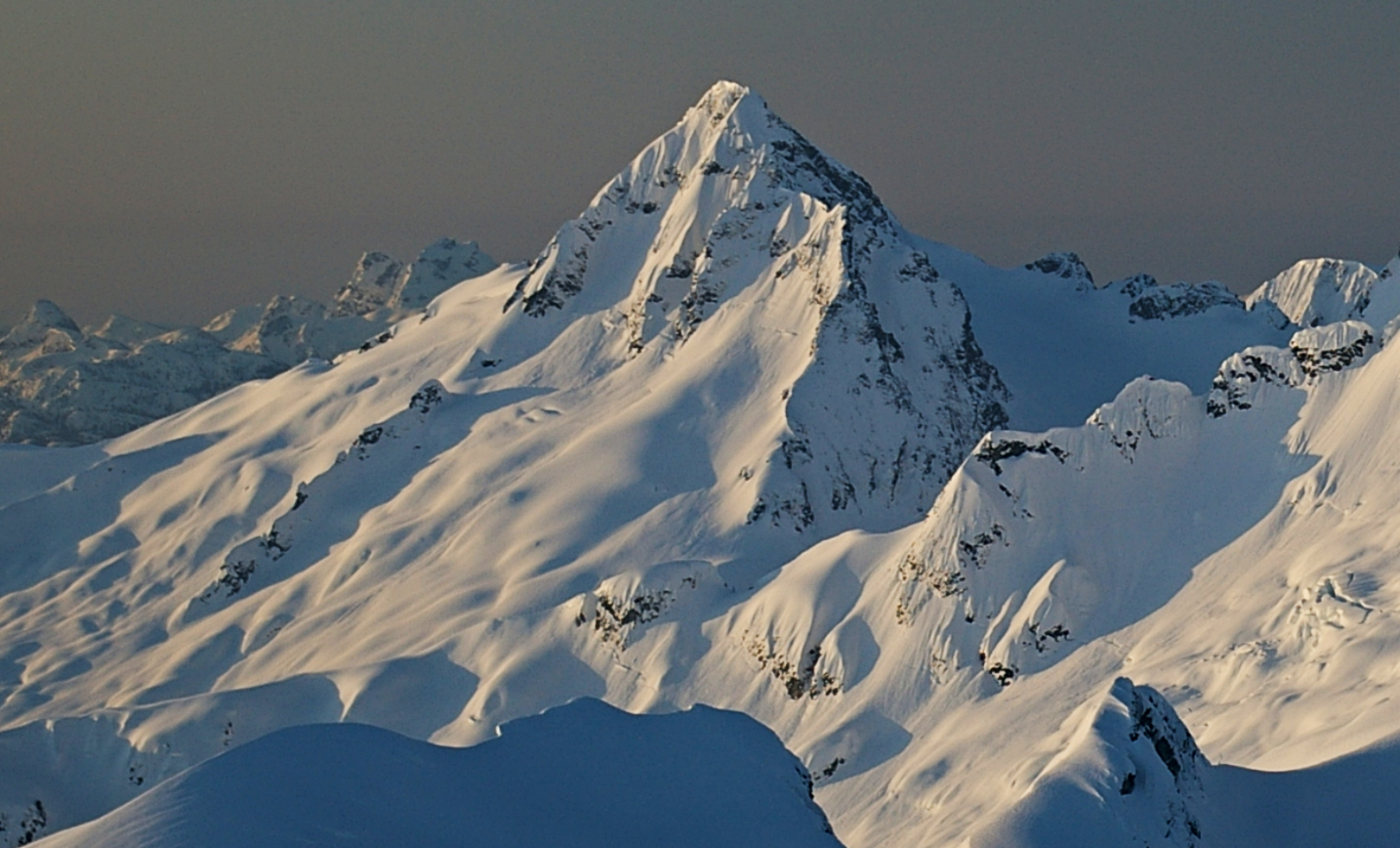
Alpha Mountain seen from the shoulder of Pelion Mountain

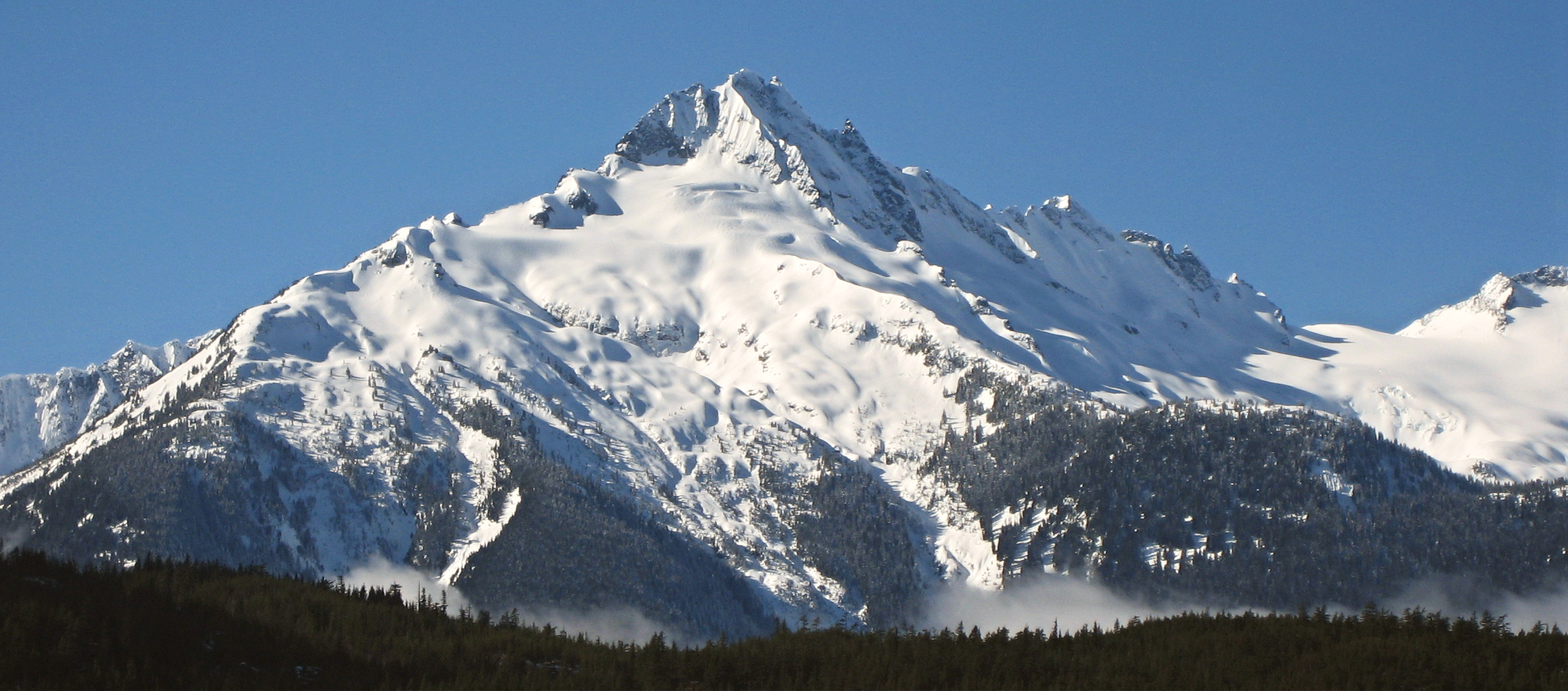
Alpha Mountain, northeast aspect, as seen from the Sea to Sky Highway

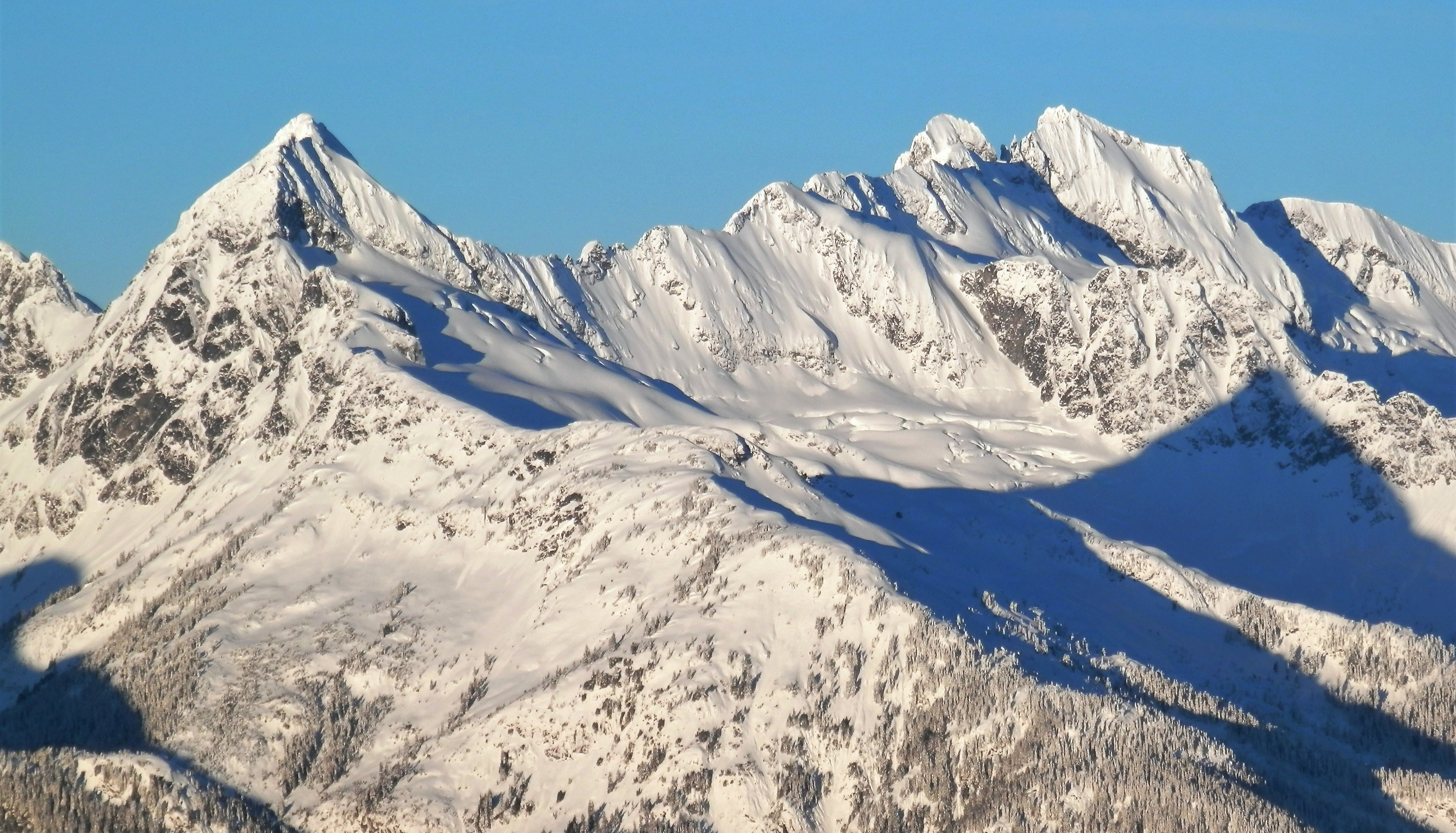
Alpha (left) and Mt. Tantalus, east aspect

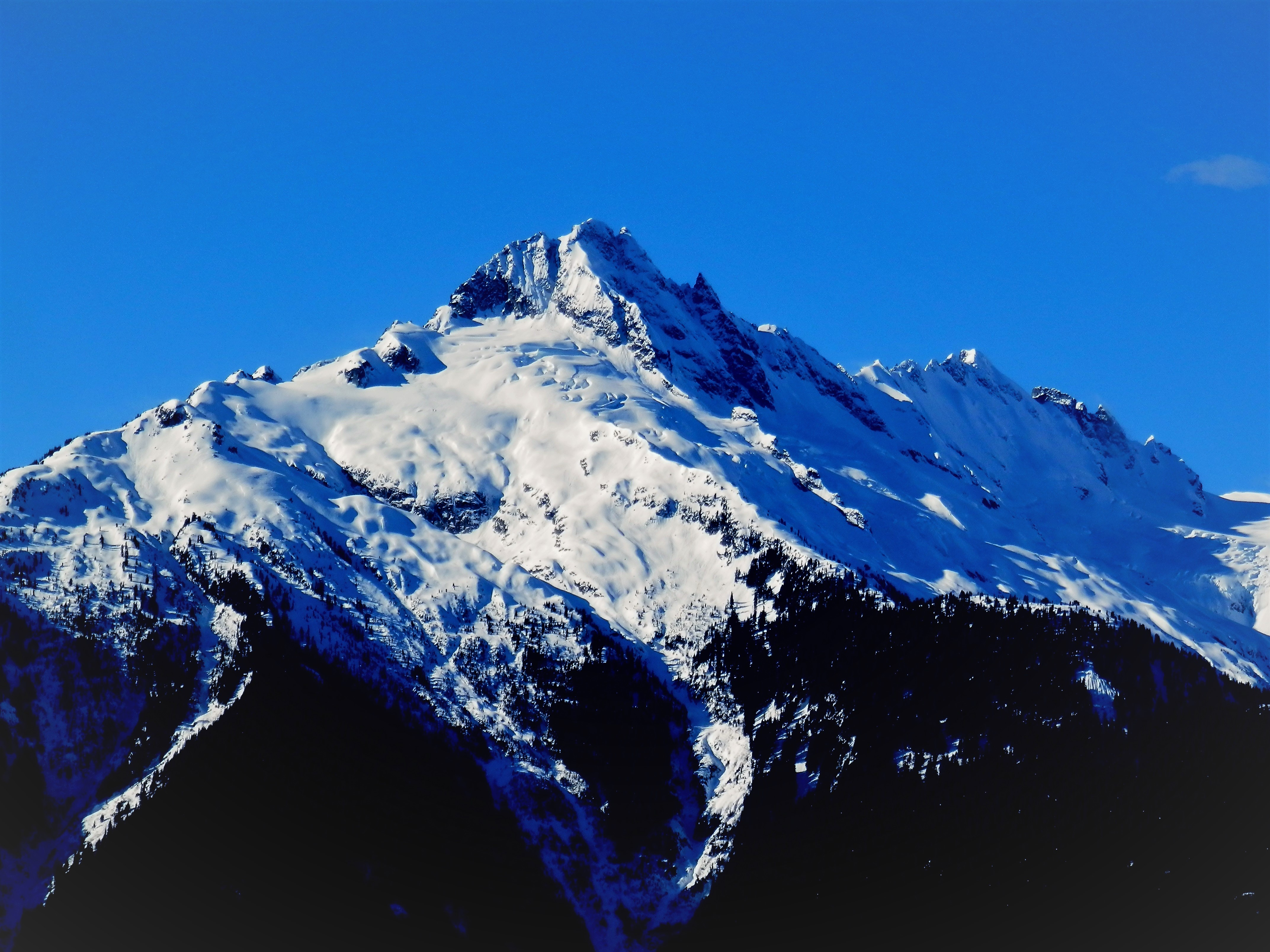
Northeast aspect

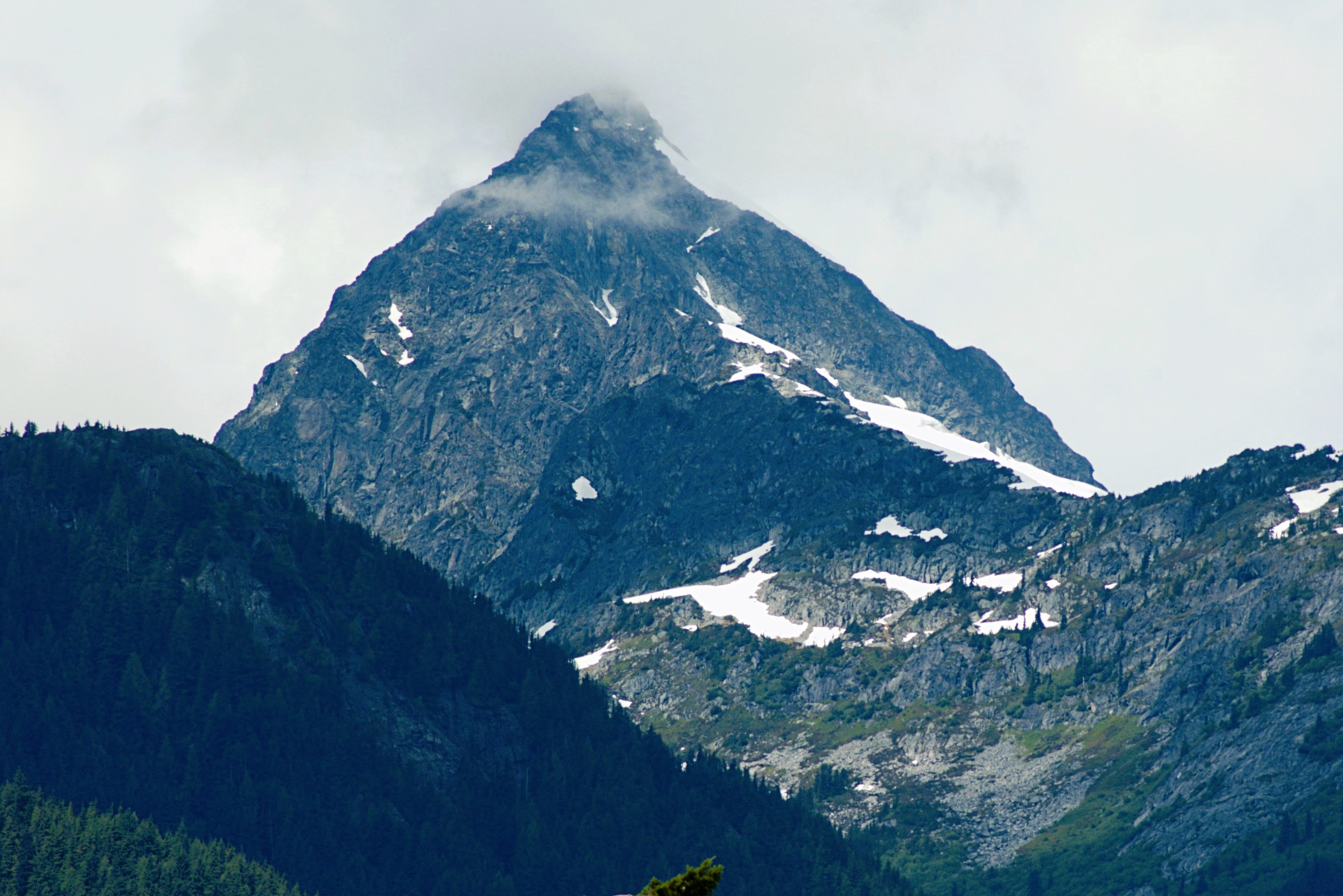
Southeast aspect

== See also ==
- Media related to Alpha Mountain at Wikimedia Commons
- Geography of British Columbia
- Geology of British Columbia
