= Pelion Mountain =

Summit in British Columbia, Canada

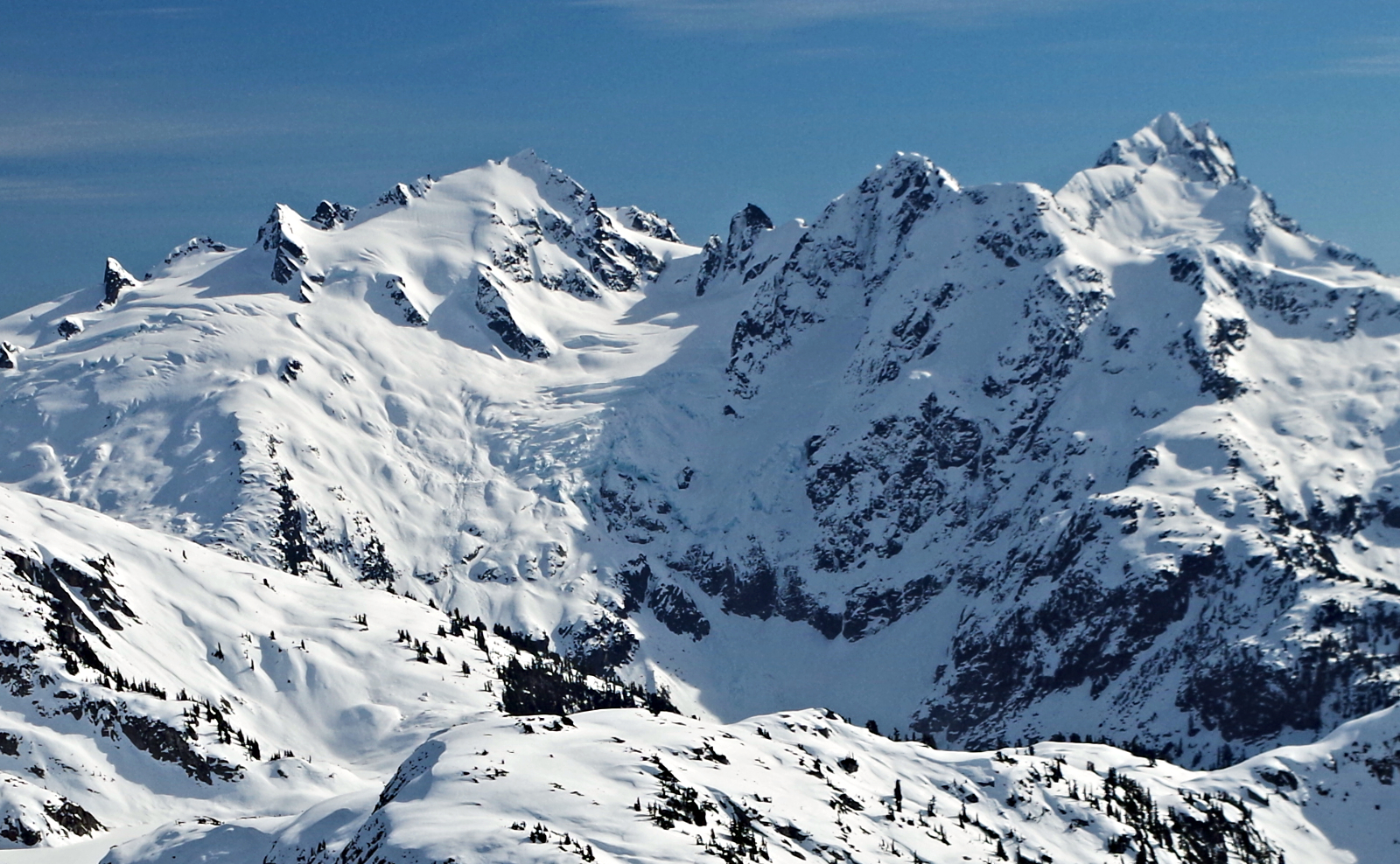
- Pelion Mountain (left) seen from northwest (Ossa Mountain and Mount Tantalus right)

Highest point
- Elevation: 2,312 m (7,585 ft)
- Prominence: 707 m (2,320 ft)
- Parent peak: Mount Tantalus (2603 m)
- Listing: Mountains of British Columbia
- Coordinates: 49°51′53″N 123°21′23″W

Geography
- Location within British Columbia Location within Canada
- Interactive map of Pelion Mountain
- Country: Canada
- Province: British Columbia
- District: New Westminster Land District
- Protected area: Tantalus Provincial Park
- Parent range: Tantalus Range; Coast Ranges
- Topo map: NTS 92G14 Cheakamus River

Climbing
- First ascent: 1944 V. Brink, B. McLellan
- Easiest route: Scramble

Pelion Mountain is a 2,312-metre (7,585-foot) summit located in the Tantalus Range, in Tantalus Provincial Park, in southwestern British Columbia, Canada. It is situated 21 km (13 mi) northwest of Squamish, 0.8 km (0 mi) east of Ossa Mountain, and 5.5 km (3 mi) north-northwest of Mount Tantalus, which is its nearest higher peak and the highest peak in the Tantalus Range. Unnamed glaciers surround the peak and precipitation runoff from the peak drains into tributaries of the Squamish River and Clowhom River. The first ascent of the mountain was made in 1944 by V. Brink and B. McLellan. The mountain names in the Tantalus Range have a Greek mythology theme, and Pelion Mountain was named for the legendary Pelion mountain in Thessaly, upon which the Aloadaes are said to have attempted to pile Mount Pelion on top of Mount Ossa in their attempt to scale Olympus, home of the Greek gods. The mountain's name was officially adopted on June 6, 1957, by the Geographical Names Board of Canada.

== Climate ==
Based on the Köppen climate classification, Pelion Mountain is located in the marine west coast climate zone of western North America. Most weather fronts originate in the Pacific Ocean, and travel east toward the Coast Mountains where they are forced upward by the range (Orographic lift), causing them to drop their moisture in the form of rain or snowfall. As a result, the Coast Mountains experience high precipitation, especially during the winter months in the form of snowfall. Temperatures can drop below −20 °C with wind chill factors below −30 °C. July through September offer the best months to catch favorable weather for climbing Pelion.

== Climbing Routes ==
Established climbing routes on Pelion Mountain:

- Southwest Ridge - class 3 First Ascent 1944
- Northwest Ridge - class 3 FA 1968
- Northeast Ridge - class 3 FA 1969
- North Face - class 3

Approaches may be made via Sigurd Creek Trail or Pokosha Creek.

== Gallery ==
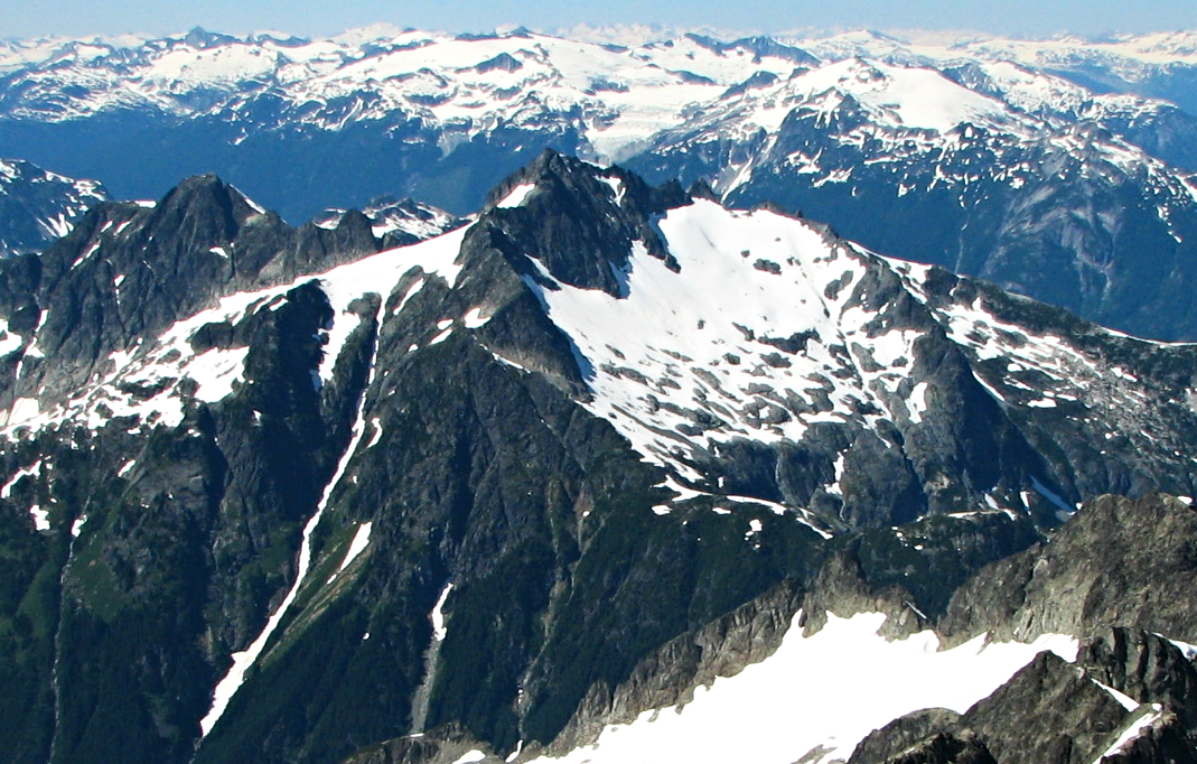
Pelion seen from Mount Tantalus' summit

== See also ==
- Geography of British Columbia
- Geology of British Columbia
