= Tantalus Range =

Mountain range in British Columbia, Canada

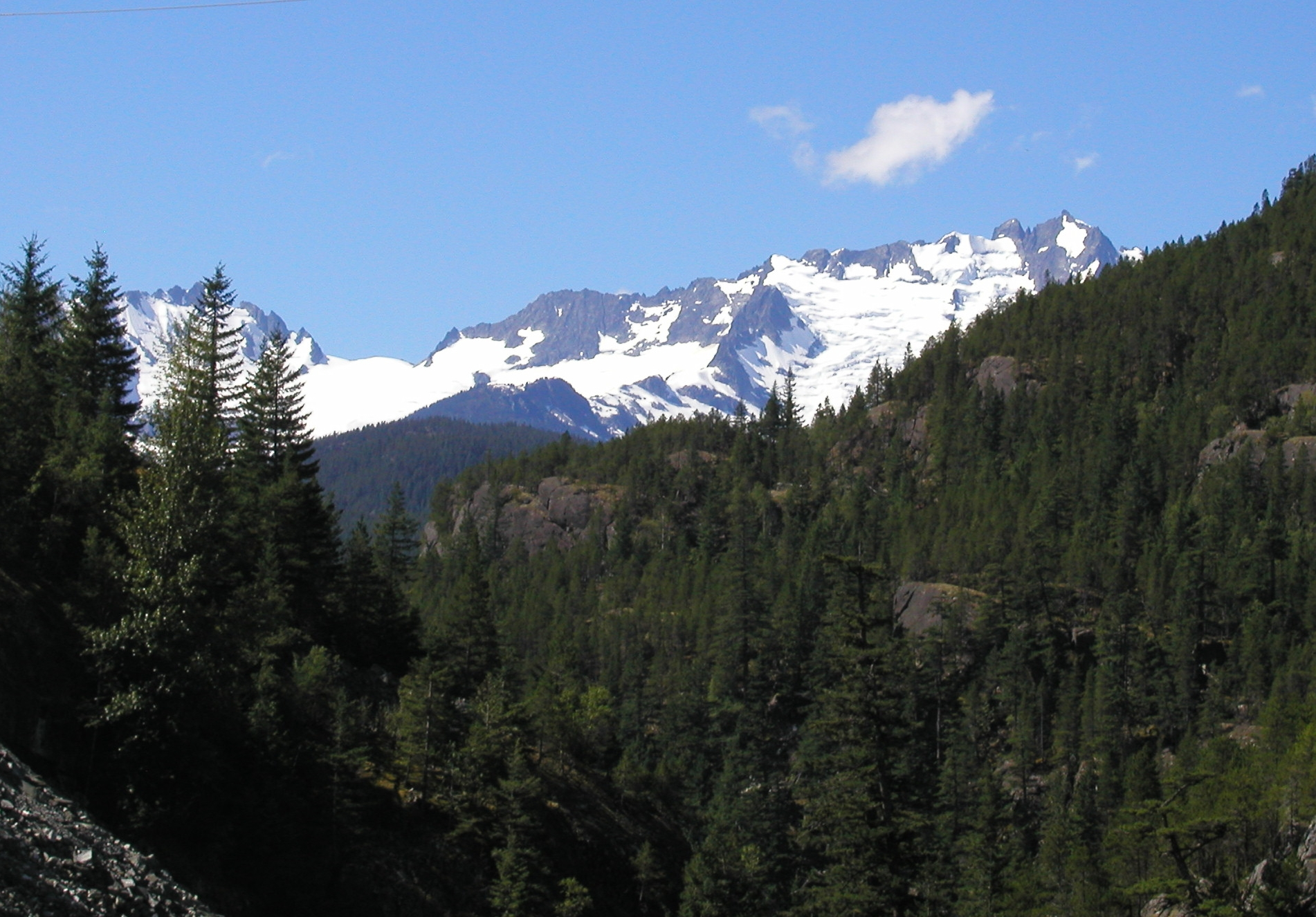
- Tantalus Range from the Sea to Sky Highway

Highest point
- Peak: Mount Tantalus
- Elevation: 2,603 m (8,540 ft)
- Coordinates: 49°49′05″N 123°19′46″W

Naming
- Native name: Tsewílx’ (Squamish)

Geography
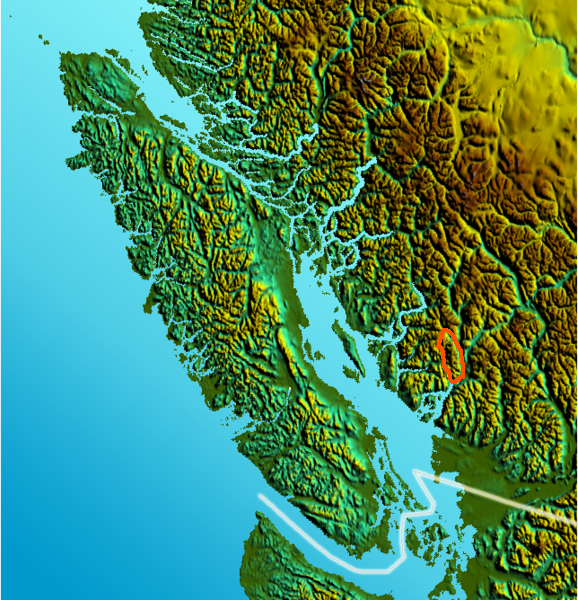
- Location map of the Tantalus Range
- Country: Canada
- Province: British Columbia
- Parent range: Pacific Ranges
- Borders on: Garibaldi Ranges, Clendinning Range and North Shore Mountains

The Tantalus Range is a subrange of the Pacific Ranges of the Coast Mountains in southern British Columbia, Canada. The range is easily viewed from the "Sea to Sky Highway" that travels from Vancouver to Squamish and Whistler. To Squamish people, the local indigenous people of the area, the name of the Tantalus Range is Tsewílx’ (/tʃə.wilχ/).

The range's southern end is on the western edge of Squamish and it runs only about 35 km (22 mi) northwest on the west bank of the Squamish River and is less than 16 km (9.9 mi) wide at its widest. It is about 460,000 ha (1,100,000 acres) or 4,600 km^{2} (1,800 mi^{2}) in area. Mount Tantalus, 2,603 m (8,540 ft) in elevation, is the highest in the range.

The origin of the name, as well as the names of many of its peaks, are from Greek mythology. Tantalus was doomed in Hades to be half-submerged in cold water with fruit dangling close but not close enough to eat, which is where the word tantalize has its root. Allegedly the name was conferred by a local mountain climber who was "tantalized" by the sight of the range's impressive spires and icefalls from across the turbulent waters of the Squamish River. Alternately, another version of the legend has Tantalus and his family frozen before a banquet, unable to move - very descriptive of the ice-draped and somehow regal character of the peaks and icefields of the range..

The Tantalus Range is known with climbers, and also with photographers and filmmakers. The best views of it can be had just north of Squamish from the Brohm Ridge and Cheakamus Canyon stretches of BC Highway 99 (the Sea-to-Sky Highway).

Neighbouring ranges:

- Garibaldi Ranges
- North Shore Mountains
- Clendinning Range

(unnamed ranges not listed at present)

== Mountains ==
- Alpha Mountain
- Mount Dione
- Omega Mountain
- Mount Niobe
- Ossa Mountain
- Pelion Mountain
- Mount Pelops
- Mount Sedgwick
- Serratus Mountain
- Mount Tantalus ('tanty' for short)
- Mount Thyestes
- Lydia Mountain

== Gallery ==
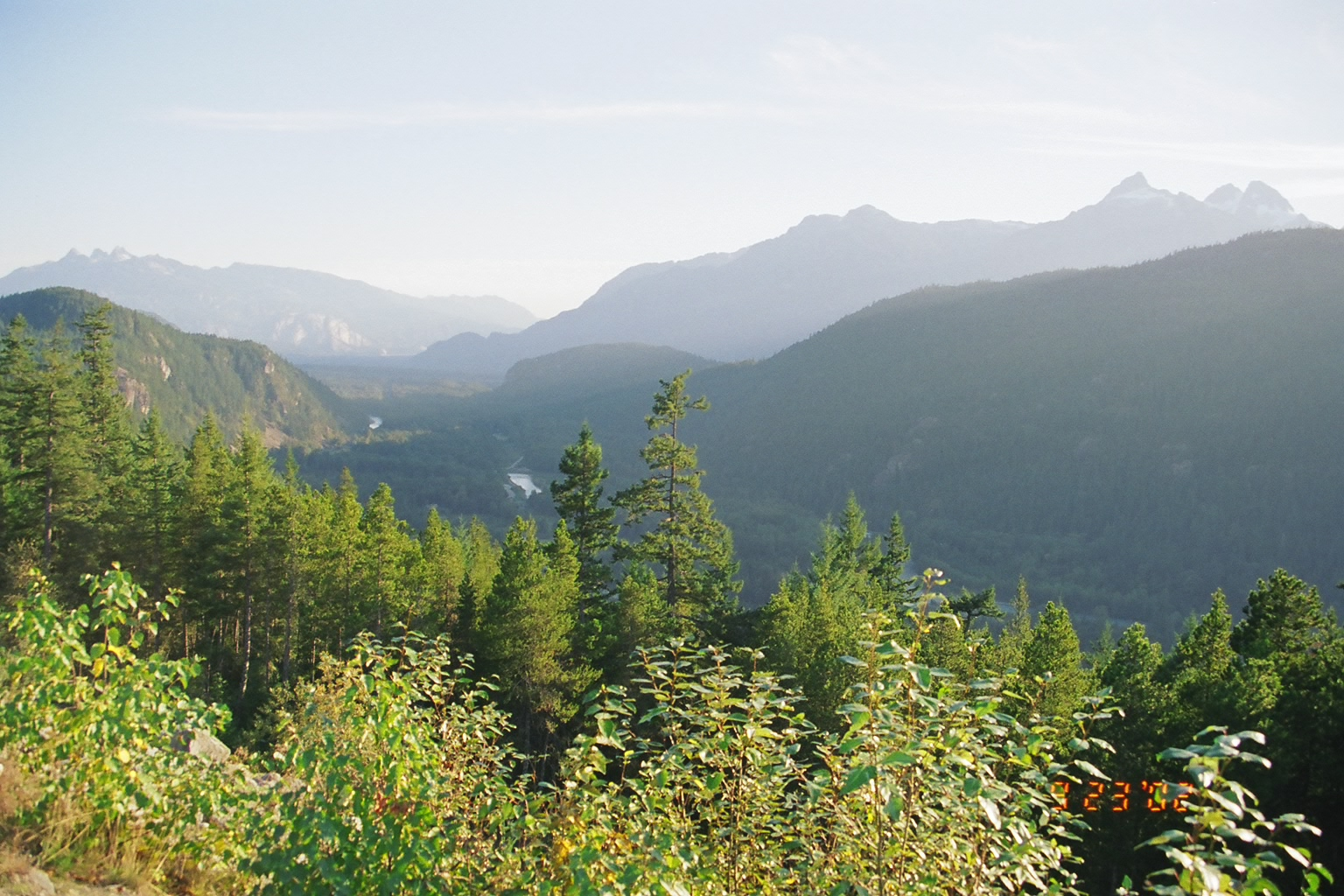

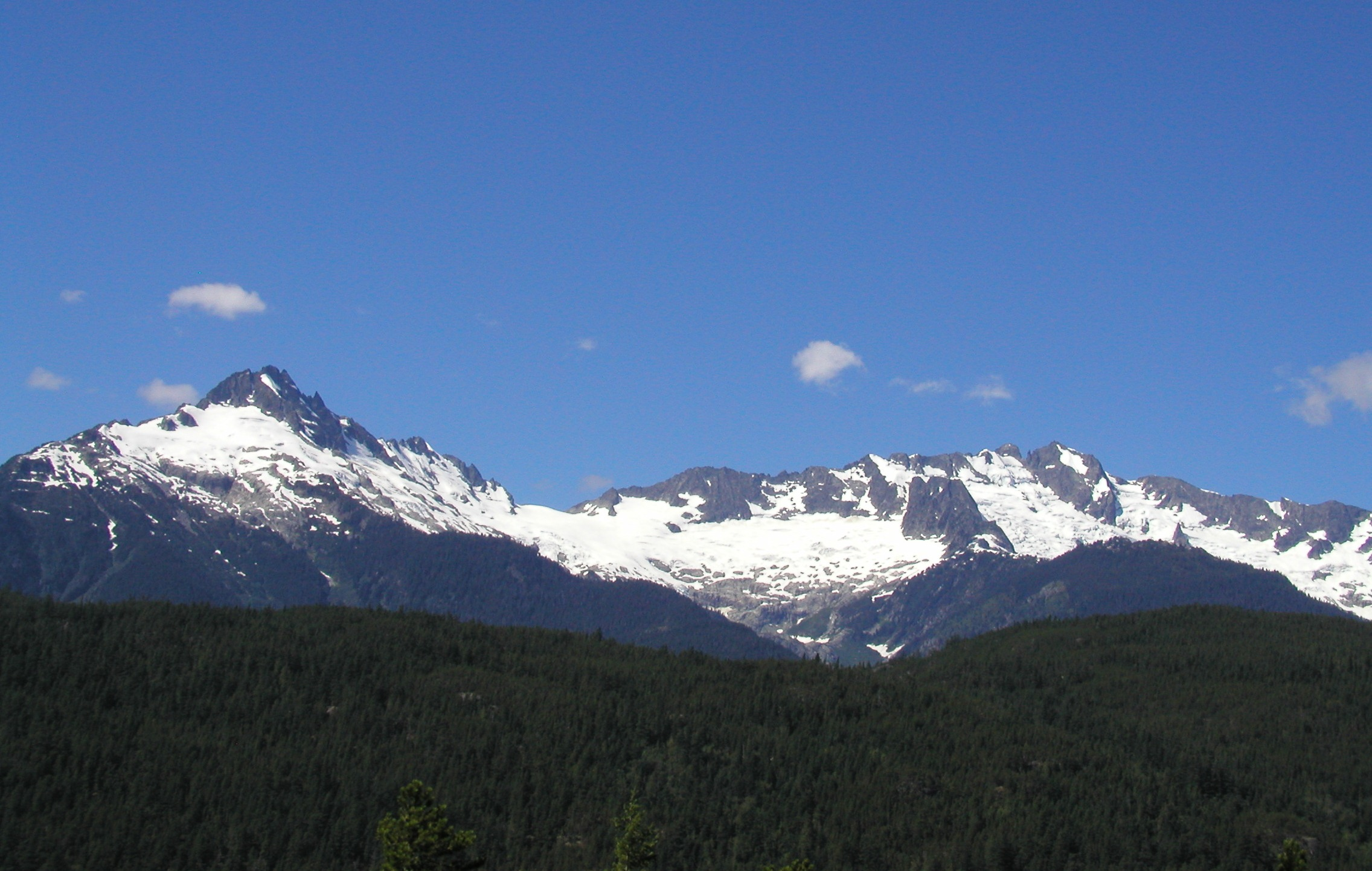
Alpha Mountain (left)

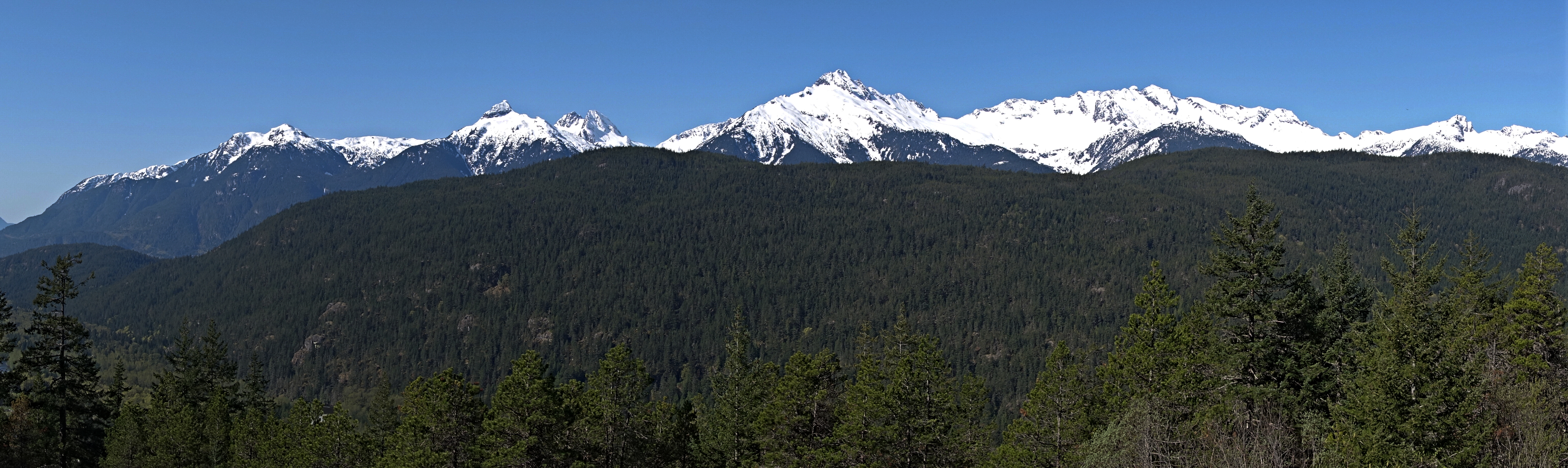
Tantalus Range from Sea to Sky Highway

== See also ==
- Tantalus Provincial Park
