= Mount Niobe =

Mountain in British Columbia, Canada

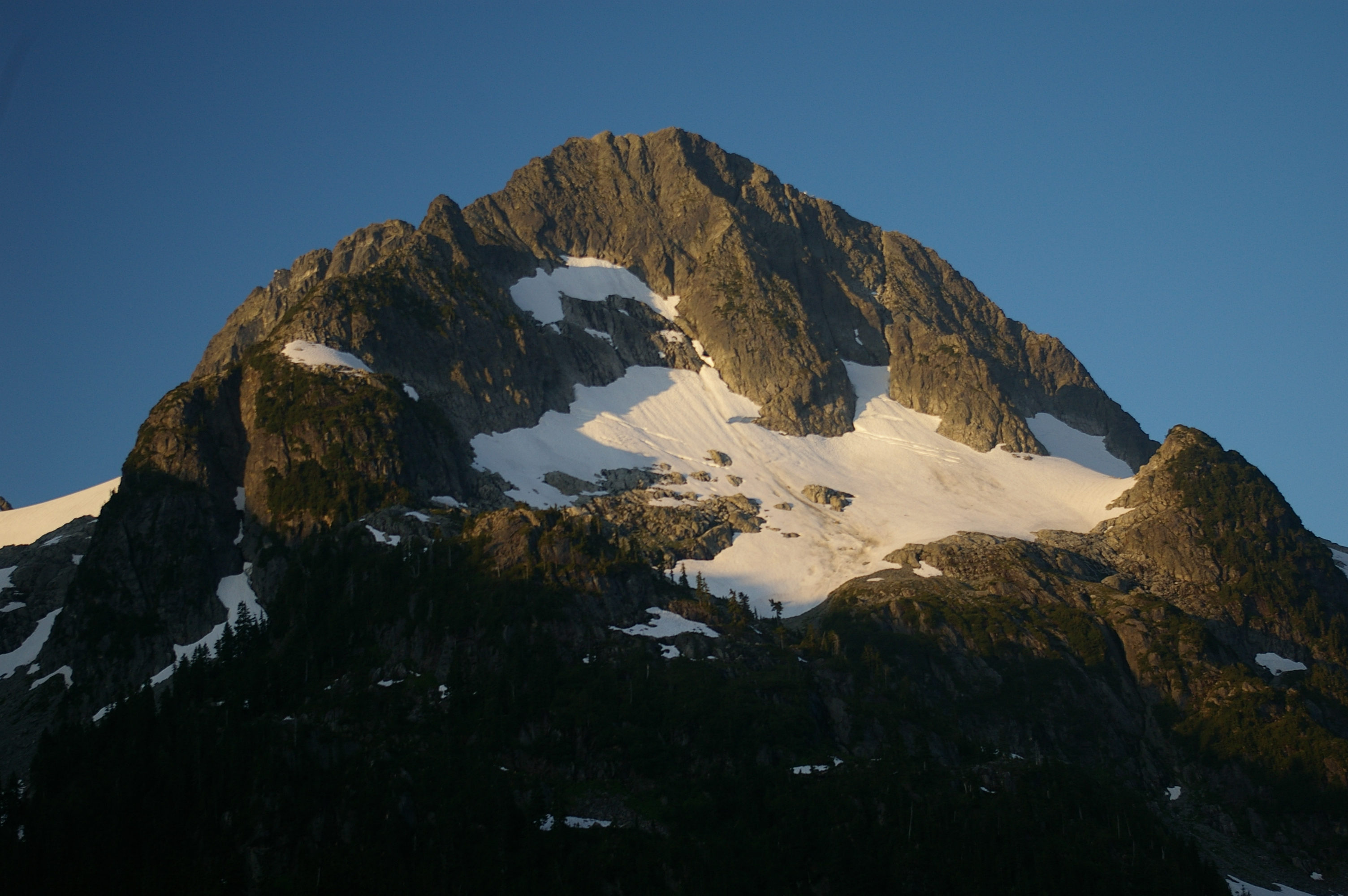
- Mount Niobe, north aspect

Highest point
- Elevation: 2,021 m (6,631 ft)
- Prominence: 471 m (1,545 ft)
- Parent peak: Mount Tantalus (2603 m)
- Listing: Mountains of British Columbia
- Coordinates: 49°46′04″N 123°15′56″W

Geography
- Location within British Columbia Location within Canada
- Interactive map of Mount Niobe
- Country: Canada
- Province: British Columbia
- District: New Westminster Land District
- Protected area: Tantalus Provincial Park
- Parent range: Tantalus Range; Pacific Coast Ranges
- Topo map: NTS 92G14 Cheakamus River

Climbing
- First ascent: 1910 by E. Kingsford-Smith and G. Warren
- Easiest route: Scramble

Mount Niobe is a 2,021-metre (6,631-foot) summit located in the Tantalus Range, in Tantalus Provincial Park, in southwestern British Columbia, Canada. It is situated 10 km (6 mi) northwest of Squamish, and 7.2 km (4 mi) southeast of Mount Tantalus, which is the highest peak in the Tantalus Range. Its nearest higher peak is Lydia Mountain, 2.03 km (1 mi) to the west-northwest, and Omega Mountain lies 1.1 km (1 mi) to the east. Lake Lovely Water lies below the northern slope of the peak and precipitation runoff from the peak drains into tributaries of the Squamish River. The first ascent of the mountain was made in 1910 by E. Kingsford-Smith and G. Warren via the south side. The mountain's name was officially adopted on June 6, 1957, by the Geographical Names Board of Canada. The mountain was named for Niobe, daughter of Tantalus in Greek mythology, with several peaks in the Tantalus Range being named for family members of Tantalus.

== Climate ==
Based on the Köppen climate classification, Mount Niobe is located in the marine west coast climate zone of western North America. Most weather fronts originate in the Pacific Ocean, and travel east toward the Coast Mountains where they are forced upward by the range (Orographic lift), causing them to drop their moisture in the form of rain or snowfall. As a result, the Coast Mountains experience high precipitation, especially during the winter months in the form of snowfall. Temperatures can drop below −20 °C with wind chill factors below −30 °C. This climate supports small glacier remnants on the east and north slopes of Niobe. The months July through September offer the most favorable weather for climbing Niobe.

== Climbing Routes ==
Established rock climbing routes on Mount Niobe:

- South Side - class 3 First ascent 1910
- Northeast Ridge - class 3 FA 1960
- North Rib - class 3 FA 1963
- West Side - class 3

== Gallery ==
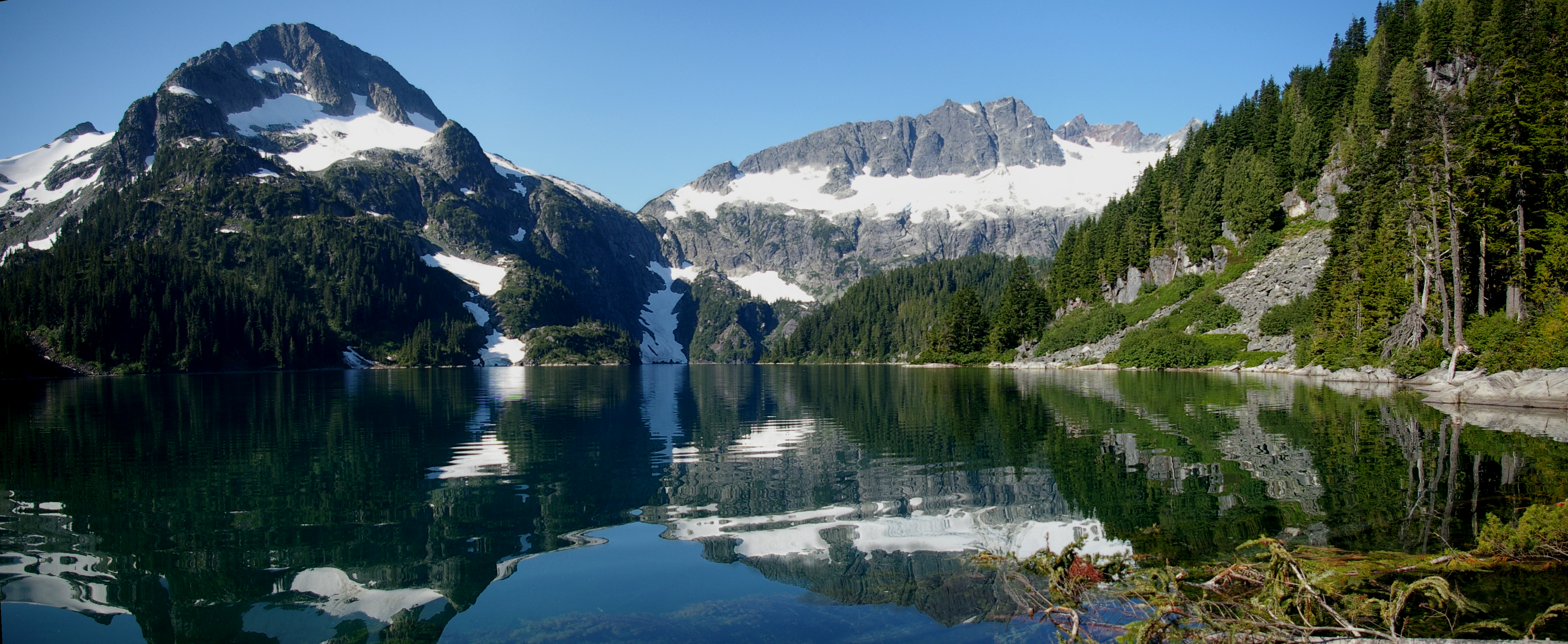
Mount Niobe (left) and Lydia Mountain reflected in Lake Lovely Water

== See also ==
- Geography of British Columbia
- Geology of British Columbia
- Mount Pelops
