= Tantalus Provincial Park =

Provincial park in British Columbia

- IUCN category Ib (wilderness area)
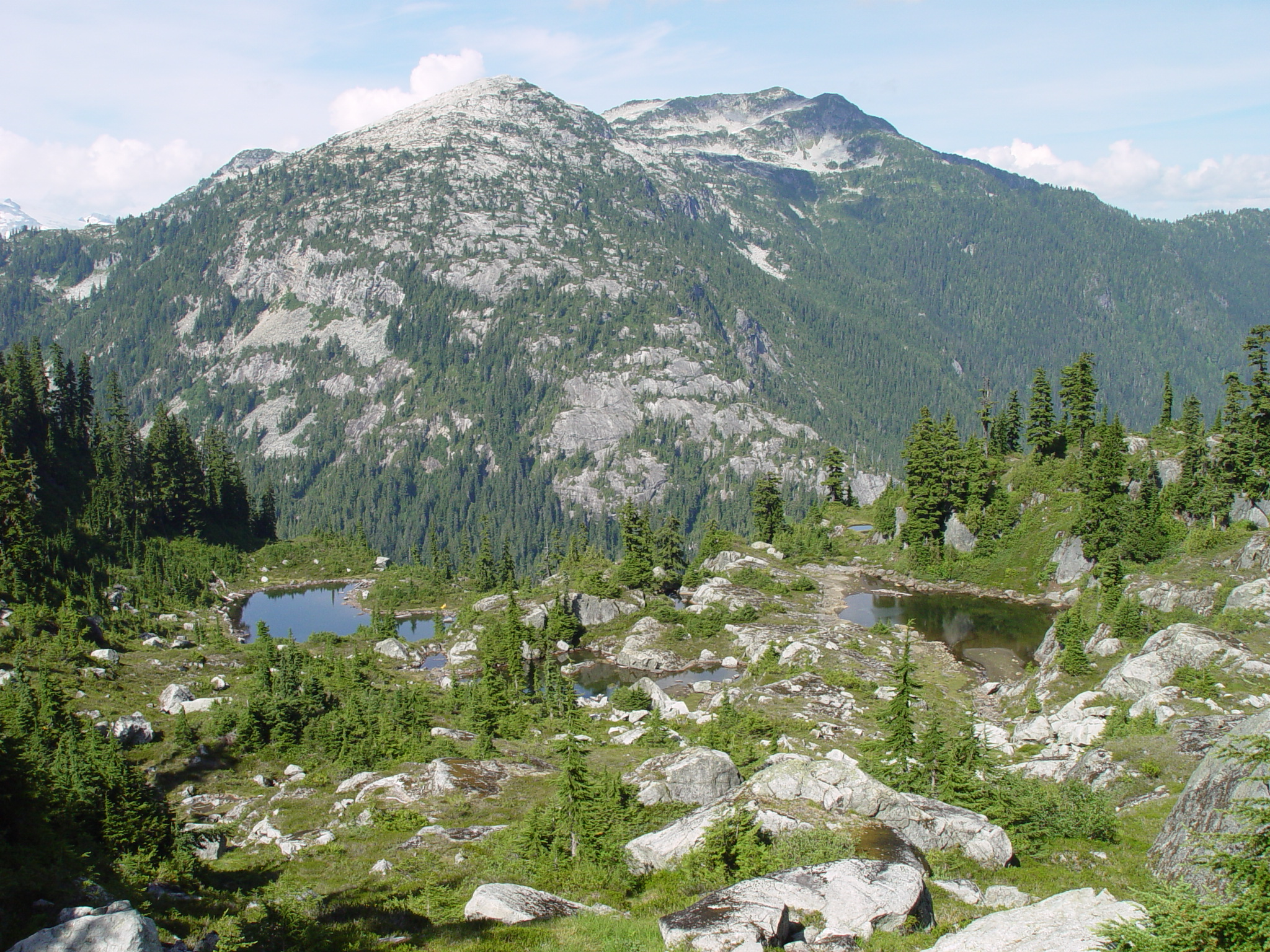
- Sigurd Peak from Pelion Mountain

- Location within British Columbia
- Interactive map of Tantalus Provincial Park
- Location: Squamish-Lillooet, British Columbia, Canada
- Nearest city: Squamish
- Coordinates: 49°50′30″N 123°17′00″W
- Area: 11,351 ha (43.83 sq mi)
- Established: December 19, 1998
- Governing body: BC Parks

Tantalus Provincial Park is a provincial park located in the Tantalus Range overlooking Squamish Valley in British Columbia, Canada. It was established on December 19, 1998 to protect a large area of pristine alpine wilderness.

== History ==
The mountains where the park now resides have been the home of the Squamish First Nation since time immemorial.

In 1988, the Lake Lovely Water Recreation Area was established for the purpose of protecting the alpine lake area and for providing mountaineering opportunities in the Tantalus Range. The recreation area was greatly expanded and upgraded to a Class A Park on December 19, 1998.

== Geography ==
The provincial park is located west of the Squamish River and is entirely within Squamish-Lillooet Regional District. It borders Esté-tiwilh Sigurd Creek Conservancy to the northeast and Brackendale Eagles Provincial Park to the southeast. The park protects the northeastern slope of the Tantalus Range, including the entirety of Alpha Mountain and Omega Mountain. Other notable features include Lake Lovely Water, Zenith Lake, Sigurd Lake, and Madden Falls.

== Activities ==
Popular park activities include hiking, rock climbing, backcountry camping, and fishing. The park features a small day-use area with pit toilets in the Lake Lovely Water area.

== See also ==
- List of British Columbia Provincial Parks
