= Mount Tantalus =

Mountain in British Columbia, Canada

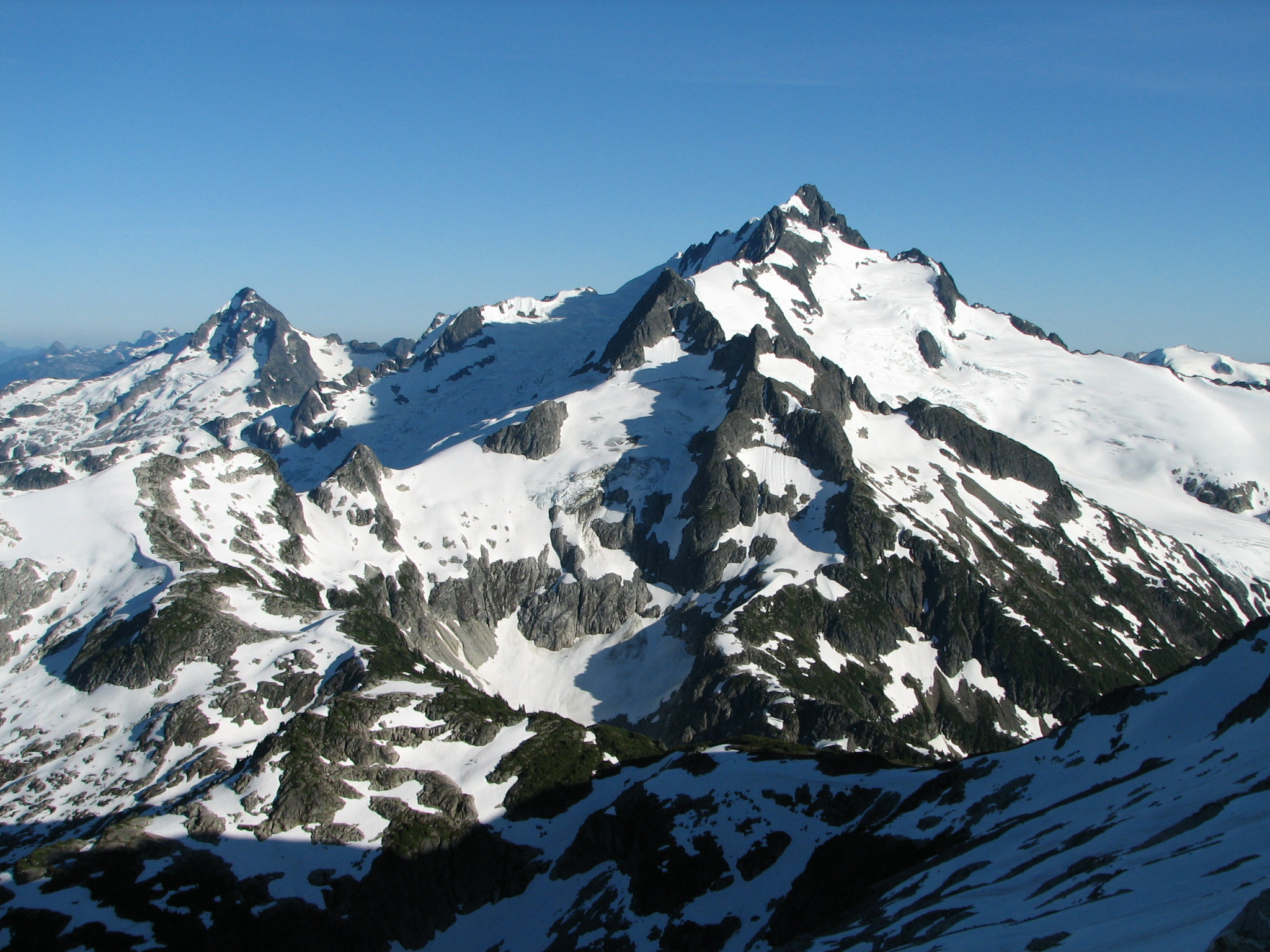

Highest point
- Elevation: 2,608 m (8,556 ft)
- Prominence: 1,478 m (4,849 ft)
- Listing: Mountains of British Columbia
- Coordinates: 49°49′05.2″N 123°19′45.8″W

Geography
- Location within British Columbia Location within Canada
- Interactive map of Mount Tantalus
- Location: British Columbia, Canada
- District: New Westminster Land District
- Parent range: Tantalus Range
- Topo map: NTS 92G14 Cheakamus River

Climbing
- First ascent: 1911 B. Darling; J. Davies; A. Morkill

Mount Tantalus is a 2,608-metre (8,556-foot) mountain in southwestern British Columbia, Canada, located 24 km (15 mi) southeast of Falk Lake and 134 km (83 mi) south of Monmouth Mountain. It is the highest mountain in the Tantalus Range of the Pacific Ranges and is famous for its snow-covered face.

== Climate ==
Based on the Köppen climate classification, Mount Tantalus is located in the marine west coast climate zone of western North America. Most weather fronts originate in the Pacific Ocean, and travel east toward the Coast Mountains where they are forced upward by the range (Orographic lift), causing them to drop their moisture in the form of rain or snowfall. As a result, the Coast Mountains experience high precipitation, especially during the winter months in the form of snowfall. Temperatures can drop below −20 °C with wind chill factors below −30 °C.

== Gallery ==
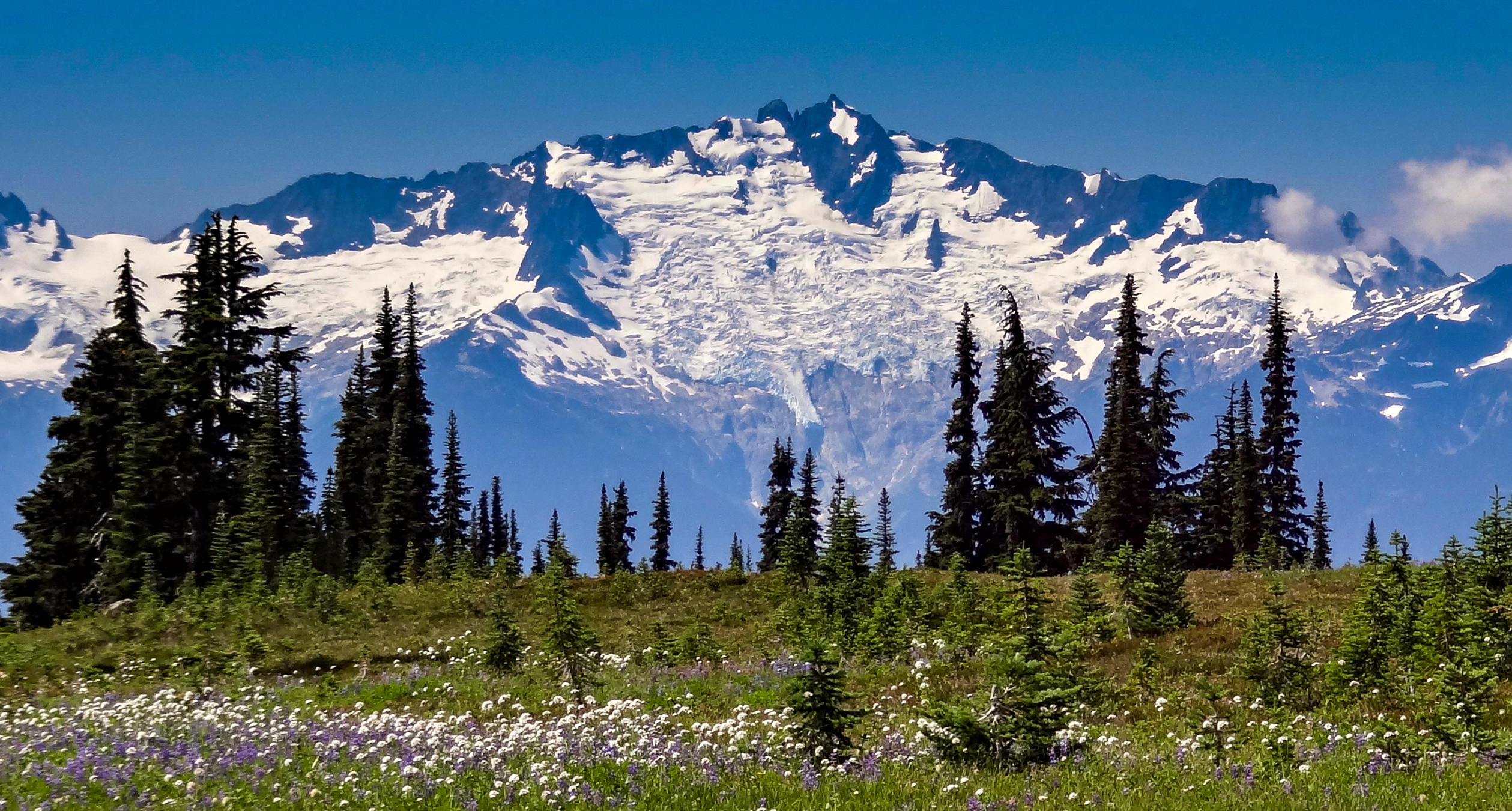
Tantalus from east

== See also ==
- Mount Dione
- Geography of British Columbia
- Geology of British Columbia
