= Ashlu Mountain =

Mountain in British Columbia, Canada

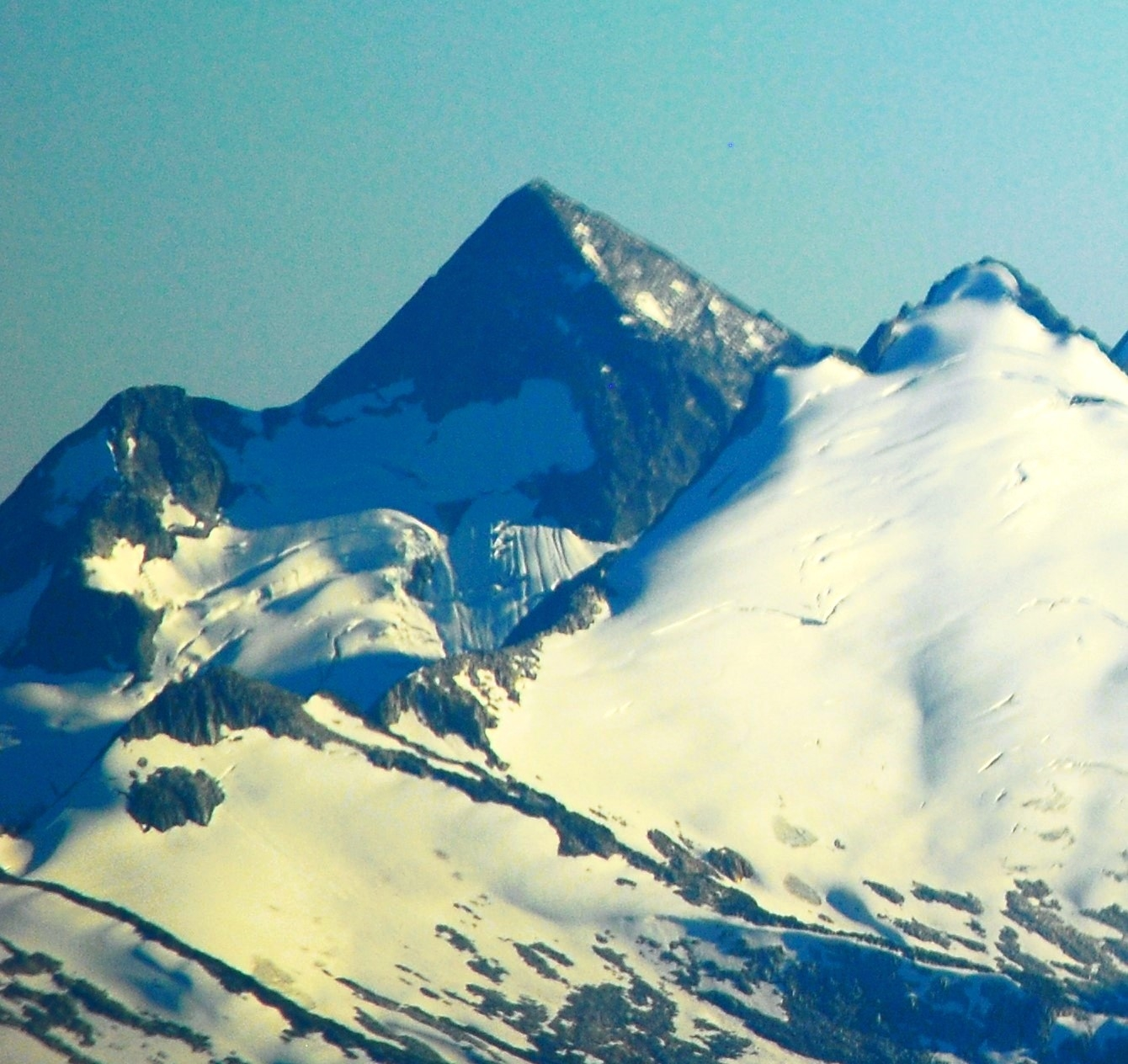
- Aerial view from north, centered

Highest point
- Elevation: 2,561 m (8,402 ft)
- Prominence: 1,179 m (3,868 ft)
- Parent peak: Mount Tinniswood
- Isolation: 33.5 km (20.8 mi)
- Listing: List of mountains of British Columbia
- Coordinates: 50°04′34″N 123°32′57″W

Geography
- Location within Squamish-Lillooet Regional District Location within British Columbia Location within Canada
- Interactive map of Ashlu Mountain
- Location: Squamish-Lillooet Regional District, British Columbia, Canada
- Region: Squamish-Lillooet Regional District
- District: New Westminster Land District
- Parent range: Elaho-Jervis Divide, Pacific Ranges
- Topo map: NTS 92G14 Cheakamus River NTS 92J4 Princess Louisa Inlet

Climbing
- First ascent: 1963

Ashlu Mountain is a 2,561-metre (8,402-foot) pyramidic mountain summit located in the Pacific Ranges in the Coast Mountains of southwestern British Columbia, Canada known for its glaciation and climbing routes. It is situated 50 km (31 mi) northwest of Squamish, in the Elaho-Jervis Divide, where it is the tallest peak in that subrange. Its nearest higher peaks are Mount Tantalus in the Tantalus Range, 33 km (20 mi) to the southeast, and its line parent, Mount Tinniswood, 33.5 km (21 mi) to the northwest at the head of Princess Louisa Inlet.

Precipitation runoff from the peak drains into its namesake Ashlu Creek in the west and the Elaho River in the east. Both of which are tributaries of the Squamish River.

== Climate ==
The mountains surrounding Ashlu Creek, including Ashlu Mountain, are characterized by their alpine terrain and major icefields. The region is subject to average snowfalls around 16 m (52.5 ft) per year which has fed major glaciation at high elevations. Snow can persist in the Ashlu valley at 500 m (1,640 ft) elevation in April.

The Coast Mountains receive some of the highest precipitation in North America, with over 4 m (13 ft) per year on their western slopes. Two-thirds of precipitation falls between November and April. Average alpine temperatures in the Coast Mountains average −10 °C (−14 °F) in the winter.

== Climbing routes ==
Ashlu Mountain is typically accessed from the Ashlu valley to the southwest via trails from Shortcut Creek off of Ashlu Main logging road, however vehicle access to this trailhead is no longer possible due to bridge washouts. The easiest route to the summit is considered a moderate scramble with some exposure and loose rock. However, there are multiple known climbing routes including:

- East Ridge (Class 2-3)
- West Ridge (Class 3)
- South Face (Class 5.8 - 5.9)
- Southeast Buttress (Class 5.10)

== See also ==
- Ossa Mountain
- Mount Jimmy Jimmy
- Geography of British Columbia
- Geology of British Columbia
