= Clendinning Lake =

Lake in British Columbia, Canada

- Location within British Columbia
- Location: Clendinning Provincial Park, Clendinning Range
- Coordinates: 50°28′N 123°53′W
- Primary inflows: Clendinning Glacier
- Primary outflows: Clendinning Creek
- Basin countries: Canada
- Max. length: 3.1 km (1.9 mi)
- Max. width: 0.5 km (0.31 mi)
- Surface elevation: 3,179 m (10,430 ft)
- Islands: None
- Settlements: None

Clendinning Lake is a medium sized, very remote lake located in the Clendinning Range about 98.5 km northwest of Squamish. It is the source of Clendinning Creek, a major tributary of the Elaho River.

== Stature ==
Oddly enough, most of the lake isn't within Clendinning Provincial Park. Only the very northernmost section (which includes the lake outlet) is within the park. About 3.1 km long and 0.5 wide, the only thing that feeds the lake is the Clendinning Glacier, which is located at its far, southern end. The lake outlet is located at the near, southern end. Rising above its east shore is Frontline Mountain and situated on a ridge above the west shore of the lake is the Doolittle Glacier.

== Access ==
Accessing the lake is very difficult, as it requires one to make a minimum 2-3 day trek up the Clendinning Creek Valley. There is no trail and much of the trip requires bushwhacking. Fording icy Clendinning Creek at least once would be an almost certainty, and it may also be needed to ford Wave Creek near its confluence with Clendinning Creek as well.

== See also ==
- List of lakes of British Columbia
