= Amicus Mountain =

Mountain in British Columbia, Canada

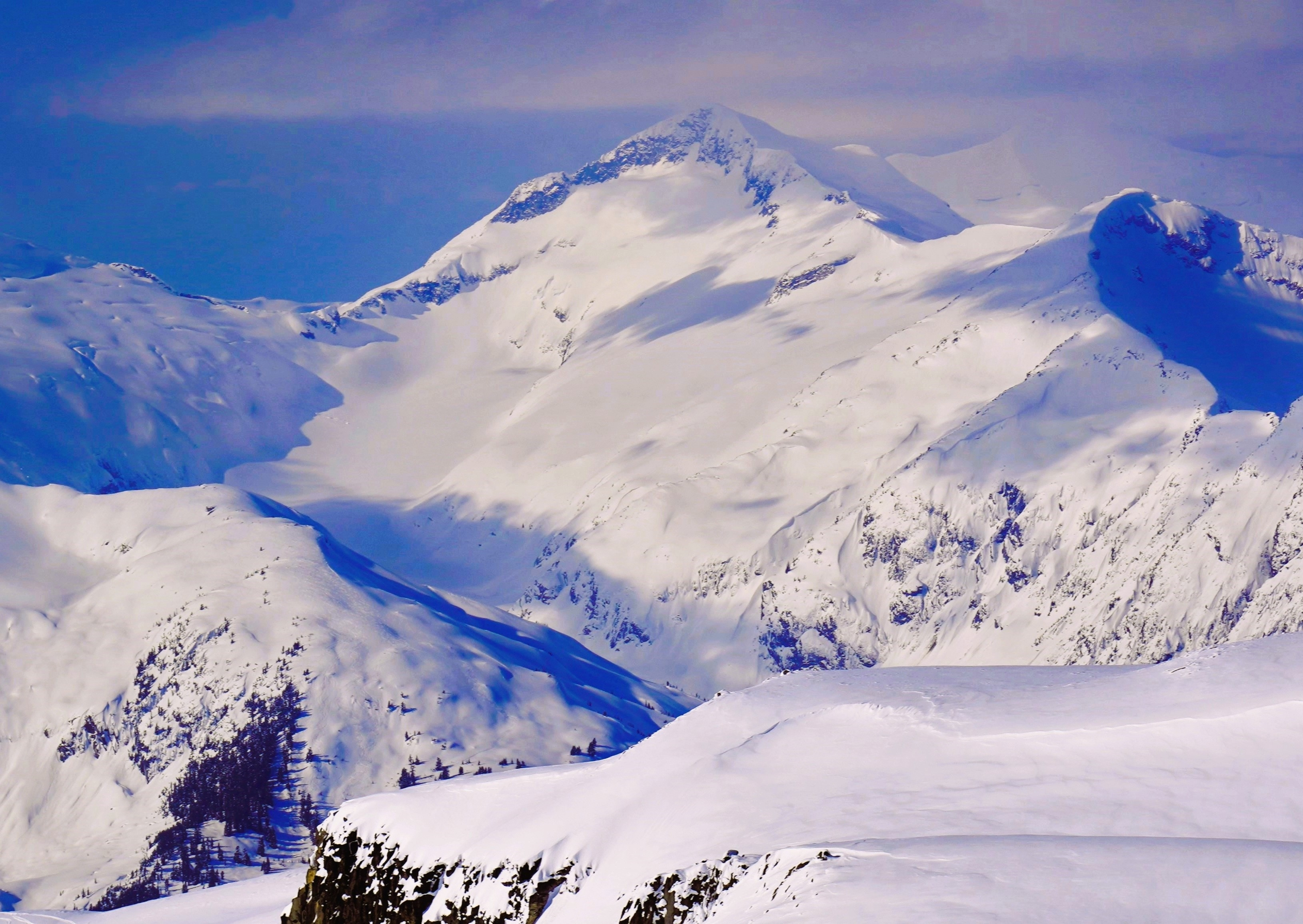
- Northeast aspect

Highest point
- Elevation: 2,510 m (8,235 ft)
- Prominence: 365 m (1,198 ft)
- Parent peak: Ashlu Mountain (2,561 m)
- Isolation: 6.22 km (3.86 mi)
- Listing: Mountains of British Columbia
- Coordinates: 50°03′06″N 123°28′16″W

Geography
- Location within British Columbia Location within Canada
- Interactive map of Amicus Mountain
- Country: Canada
- Province: British Columbia
- District: New Westminster Land District
- Parent range: Coast Mountains
- Topo map: NTS 92J3 Brandywine Falls

Amicus Mountain is a 2,510-metre (8,235-foot) glaciated summit in British Columbia, Canada.

== Description ==
Amicus Mountain is located in the Coast Mountains, 37 kilometres (23 mi) west-southwest of Whistler and 1.52 kilometres (0.94 mi) west-northwest of Icecap Peak, which is the nearest neighbor. Precipitation runoff and glacial meltwater from this mountain drain into tributaries of the Squamish River. Amicus Mountain is more notable for its rise above local terrain than for its absolute elevation as topographic relief is significant with the summit rising 2,410 metres (7,907 ft) above the Squamish River in nine kilometres (5.6 mi) and 1,960 metres (6,430 ft) above Ashlu Creek in seven kilometres (4.3 mi). "Amicus" is the Latin word for "friend." The Geographical Names Board of Canada has not officially adopted the mountain's toponym.

== Climate ==
Based on the Köppen climate classification, Amicus Mountain is located in the marine west coast climate zone of western North America. Most weather fronts originate in the Pacific Ocean and travel east toward the Coast Mountains, where they are forced upward by the range (orographic lift), causing them to drop their moisture in the form of rain or snowfall. As a result, the Coast Mountains experience high precipitation, especially during the winter months in the form of snowfall. Winter temperatures can drop below −20 °C with wind chill factors below −30 °C. This climate supports unnamed glaciers surrounding the peak. The months of July through September offer the most favorable weather for climbing Amicus Mountain.

== Gallery ==
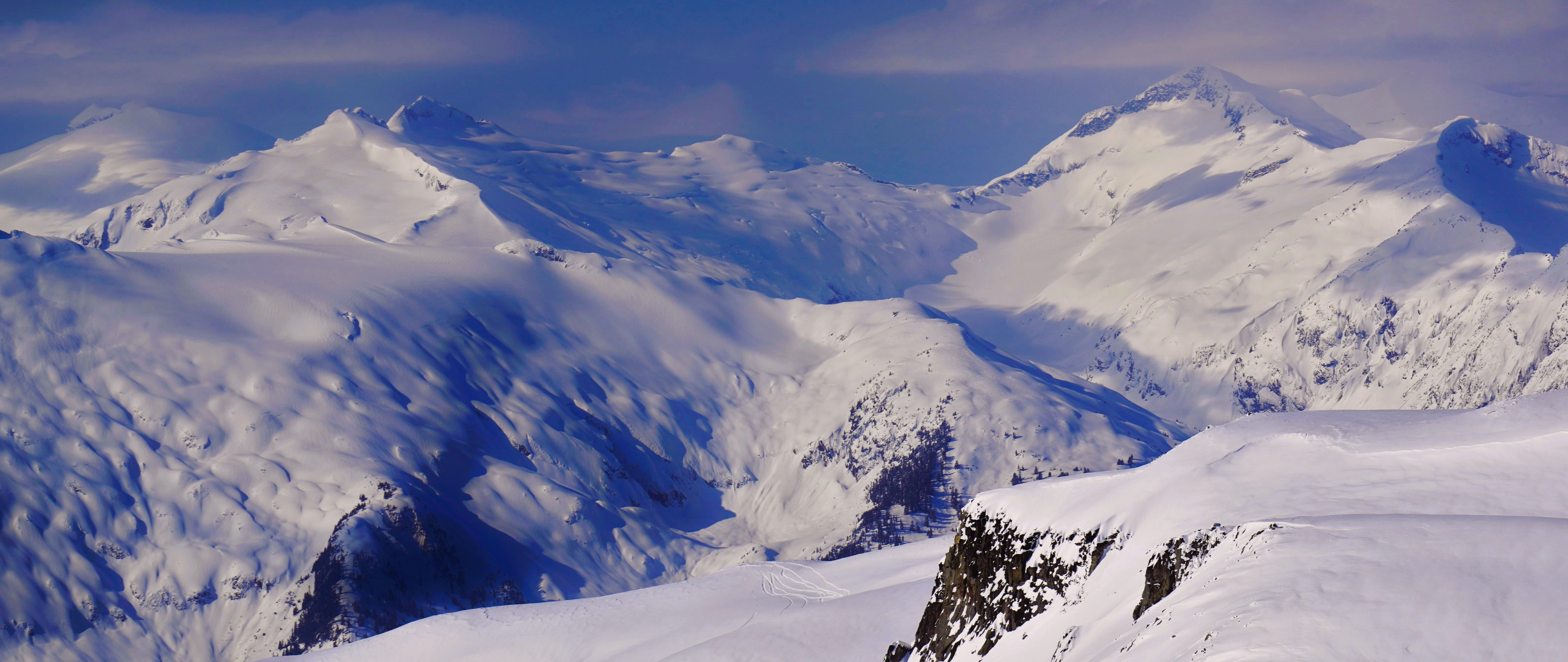
Icecap Peak (left) and Amicus Mountain (right)

== See also ==
- Geography of British Columbia
- Geology of British Columbia
