= Icecap Peak =

Mountain in British Columbia, Canada

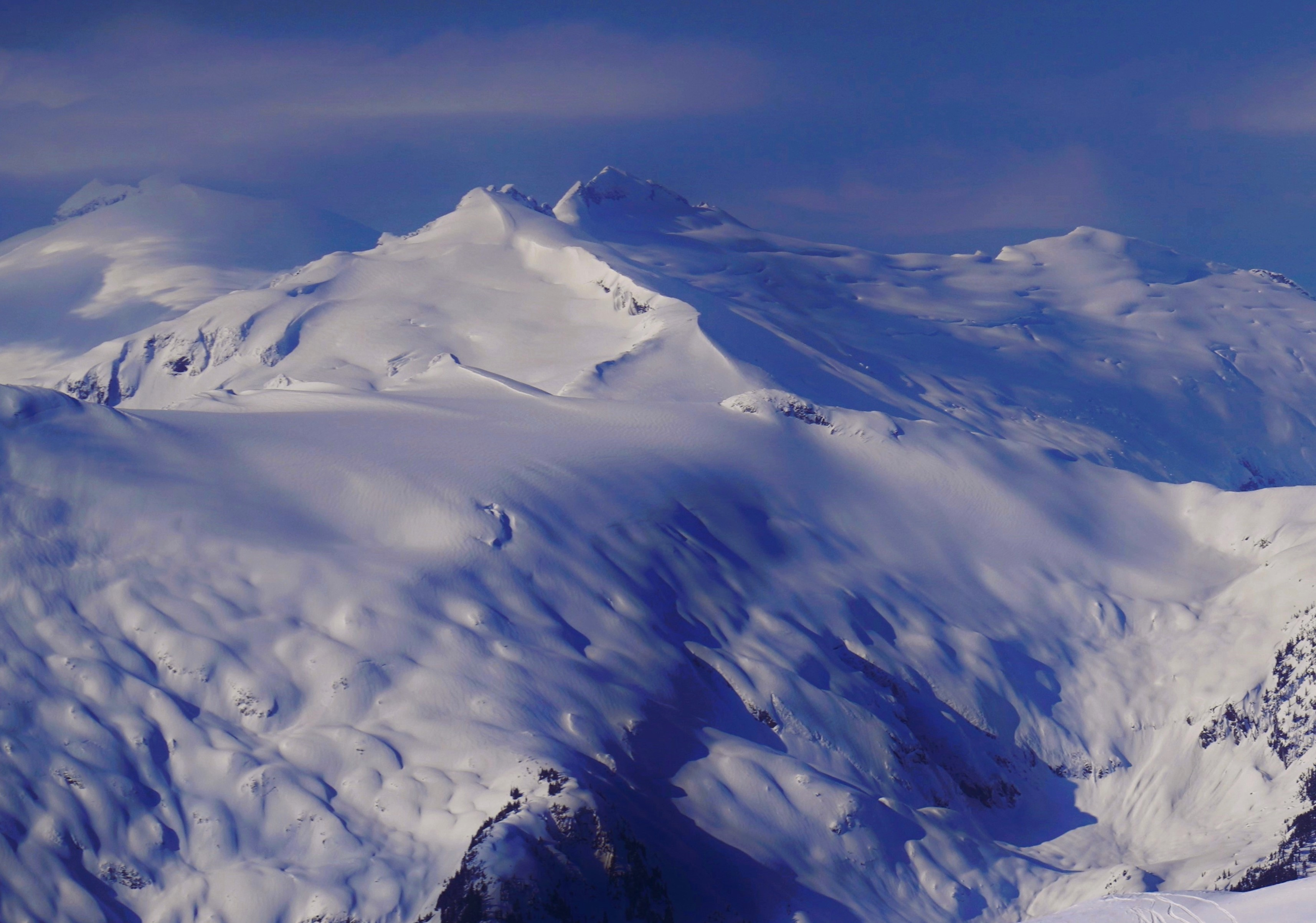
- Northeast aspect

Highest point
- Elevation: 2,435 m (7,989 ft)
- Prominence: 282 m (925 ft)
- Parent peak: Pykett Peak (2,458 m)
- Isolation: 2.45 km (1.52 mi)
- Listing: Mountains of British Columbia
- Coordinates: 50°02′33″N 123°26′23″W

Naming
- Etymology: Ice cap

Geography
- Location within British Columbia Location within Canada
- Interactive map of Icecap Peak
- Country: Canada
- Province: British Columbia
- District: New Westminster Land District
- Parent range: Coast Mountains
- Topo map: NTS 92J3 Brandywine Falls

Icecap Peak is a 2,435-metre (7,989-foot) glaciated summit in British Columbia, Canada.

== Description ==
Icecap Peak is located in the Coast Mountains, 36 kilometres (22 mi) west-southwest of Whistler and 2.5 kilometres (1.6 mi) east-southeast of Amicus Mountain, which is the nearest higher neighbor. Precipitation runoff and glacial meltwater from this mountain drains into tributaries of the Squamish River. Icecap Peak is more notable for its rise above local terrain than for its absolute elevation as topographic relief is significant with the summit rising 2,335 metres (7,660 ft) above the Squamish River in six kilometres (3.7 mi). The mountain's toponym was officially adopted June 22, 1967, by the Geographical Names Board of Canada as submitted by Dick Culbert, author of A Climber's Guide to the Coastal Ranges of British Columbia.

== Climate ==
Based on the Köppen climate classification, Icecap Peak is located in the marine west coast climate zone of western North America. Most weather fronts originate in the Pacific Ocean, and travel east toward the Coast Mountains where they are forced upward by the range (orographic lift), causing them to drop their moisture in the form of rain or snowfall. As a result, the Coast Mountains experience high precipitation, especially during the winter months in the form of snowfall. Winter temperatures can drop below −20 °C with wind chill factors below −30 °C. This climate supports unnamed glaciers surrounding the peak. The months July through September offer the most favorable weather for climbing Icecap Peak.

== Gallery ==
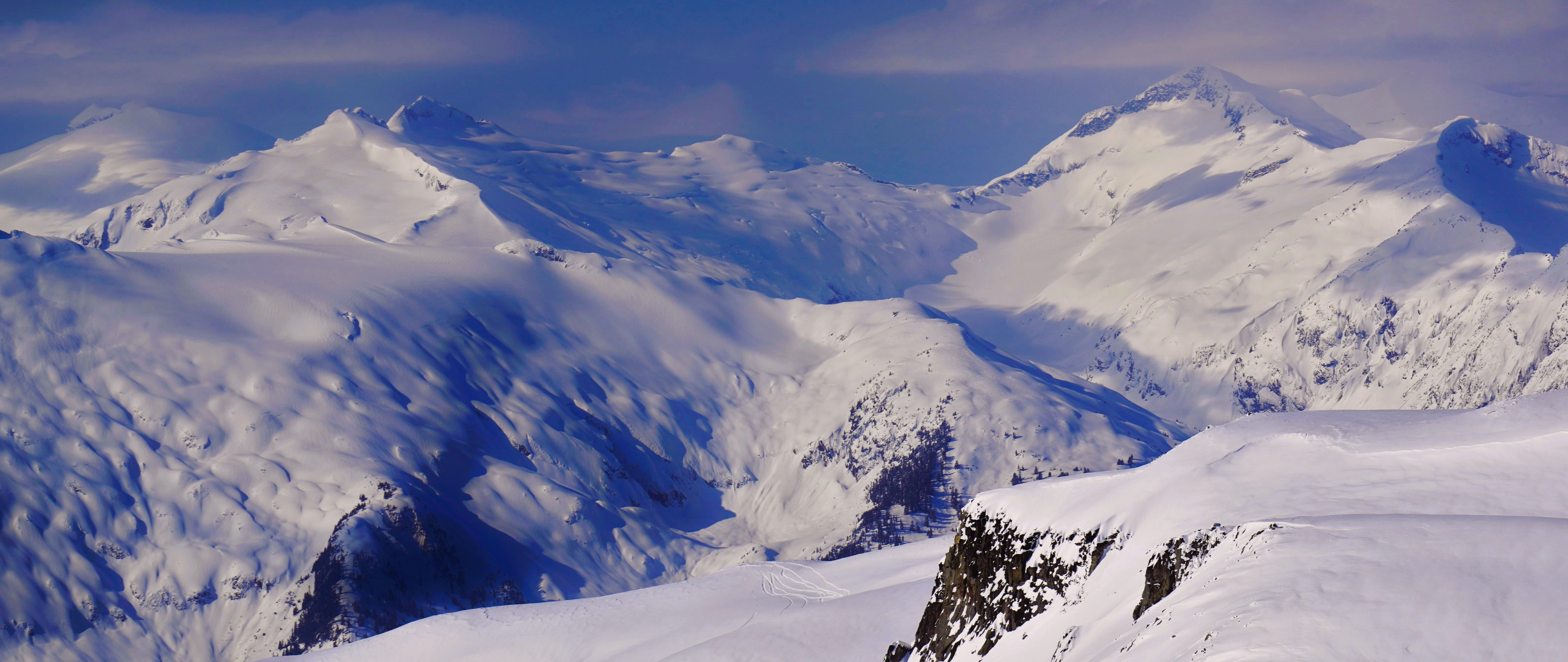
Icecap Peak (left) and Amicus Mountain (right)

== See also ==
- Geography of British Columbia
- Geology of British Columbia
