= Clendinning Provincial Park =

Provincial park in British Columbia, Canada

- IUCN category II (national park)
- Location within British Columbia
- Interactive map of Clendinning Provincial Park
- Location: Lillooet Land District, British Columbia, Canada
- Nearest city: Pemberton, BC
- Coordinates: 50°24′59″N 123°44′00″W
- Area: 30,330 ha (74,900 acres)
- Established: December 9, 1998
- Governing body: BC Parks

Clendinning Provincial Park is a provincial park in British Columbia, Canada. It surrounds the drainage of Clendinning Creek, which is a tributary of the Elaho River. Its name is shared by the Clendinning Range, of which Mount Clendinning is the highest summit (there is also a Clendinning Lake in the same basin).

Established as a Canadian Protected Area on October 28, 1996, and made a provincial park by order-in-council on December 9, 1998, it occupies an area of 30,330 hectares.
