= Mount Pelops =

Mountain in British Columbia, Canada

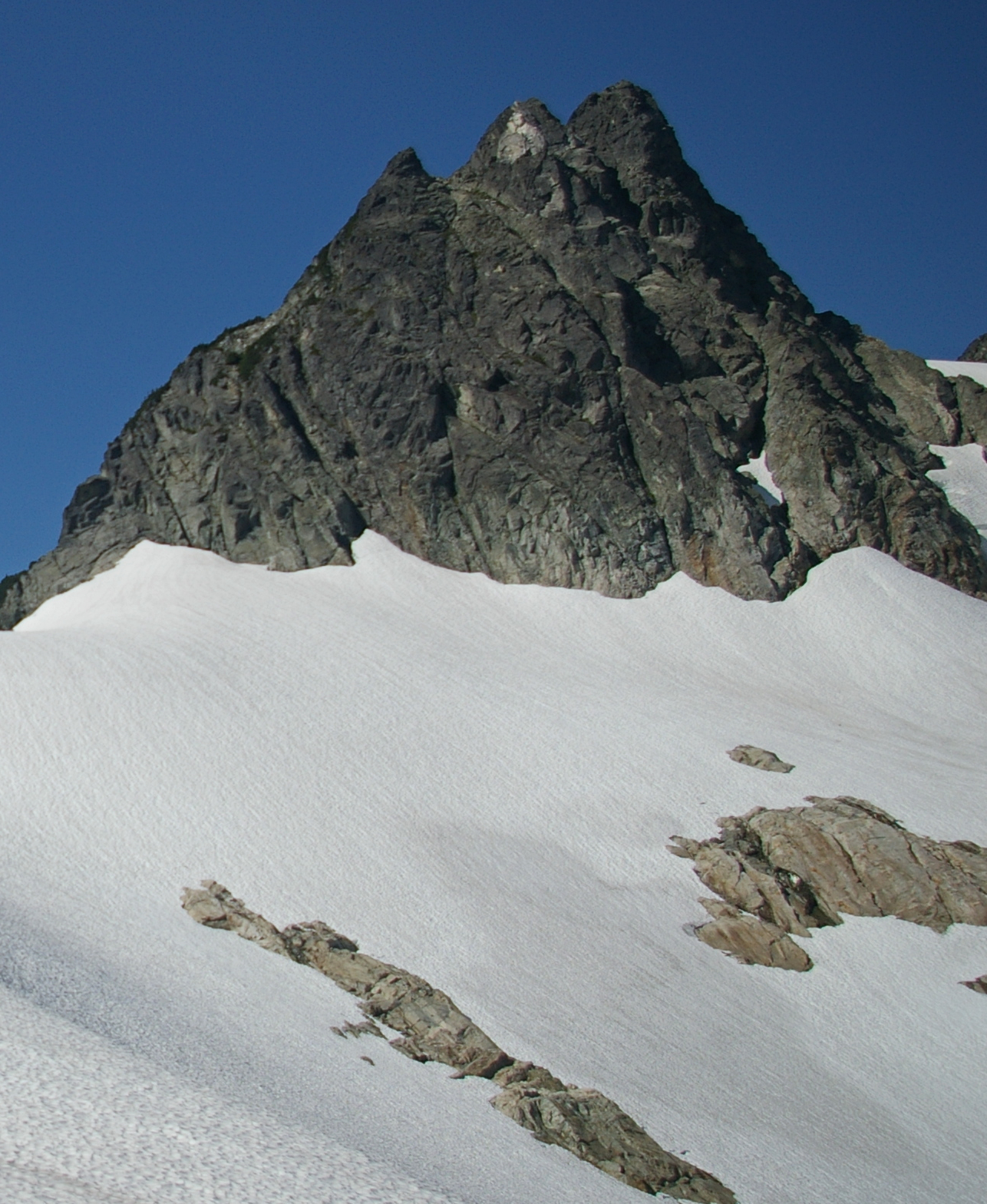
- Mount Pelops, east aspect

Highest point
- Elevation: 2,015 m (6,611 ft)
- Prominence: 105 m (344 ft)
- Parent peak: Mount Niobe (2021 m)
- Listing: Mountains of British Columbia
- Coordinates: 49°45′57″N 123°15′49″W

Geography
- Location within British Columbia Location within Canada
- Country: Canada
- Province: British Columbia
- District: New Westminster Land District
- Protected area: Tantalus Provincial Park
- Parent range: Tantalus Range; Coast Ranges
- Topo map: NTS 92G14 Cheakamus River

Climbing
- First ascent: 1916 by J. Fyles and T. Fyles
- Easiest route: Scramble

Mount Pelops is a 2,015-metre (6,611-foot) mountain summit located in the Tantalus Range, in Tantalus Provincial Park, in southwestern British Columbia, Canada. It is situated 10 km (6 mi) northwest of Squamish, and 7.5 km (5 mi) southeast of Mount Tantalus, which is the highest peak in the Tantalus Range. Its nearest higher peak is Mount Niobe, 0.2 km (0 mi) to the northwest, and Omega Mountain lies 1.7 km (1 mi) to the east. Precipitation runoff from the peak drains into tributaries of the Squamish River. The first ascent of the mountain was made in 1916 by Tom Fyles and his brother, John Fyles. The mountain was named for Pelops, brother of Niobe and son of Tantalus according to Greek mythology, with several peaks in the Tantalus Range being named for family members of Tantalus. The mountain's name was officially adopted on June 6, 1957, by the Geographical Names Board of Canada.

== Climate ==
Based on the Köppen climate classification, Mount Pelops is located in the marine west coast climate zone of western North America. Most weather fronts originate in the Pacific Ocean, and travel east toward the Coast Mountains where they are forced upward by the range (Orographic lift), causing them to drop their moisture in the form of rain or snowfall. As a result, the Coast Mountains experience high precipitation, especially during the winter months in the form of snowfall. Winter temperatures can drop below −20 °C with wind chill factors below −30 °C. This climate supports small glacier remnants on the east and north slopes of Pelops. The months July through September offer the most favorable weather for climbing Pelops.

== Climbing Routes ==
Established rock climbing routes on Mount Pelops:

- North Side - class 3
- Southeast Ridge - class 2-3
- East Face - class 4 First ascent in 1962

== Gallery ==
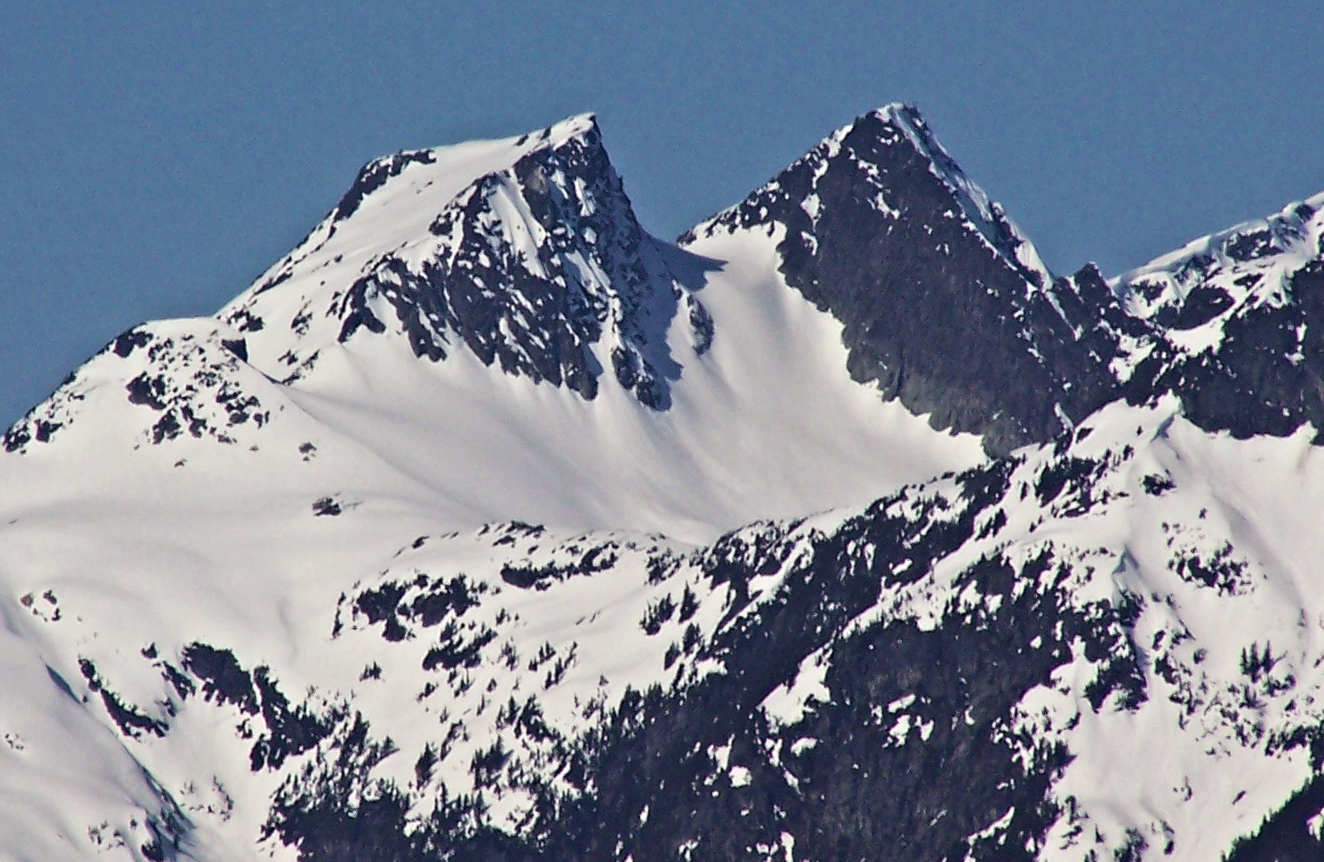
Pelops (left) and Niobe

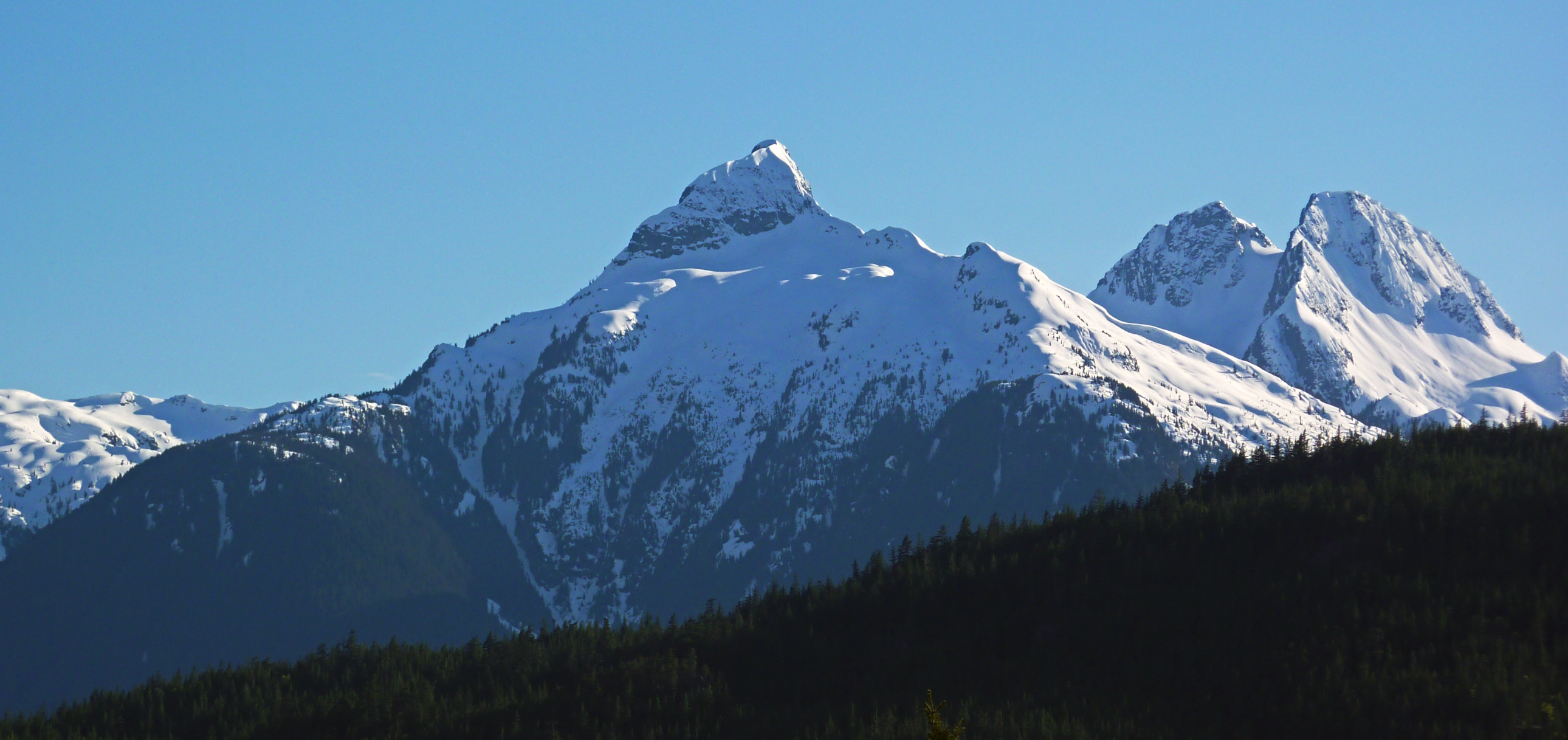
Omega Mountain centered, Pelops and Niobe to right, seen from the Sea to Sky Highway

== See also ==
- Geography of British Columbia
- Geology of British Columbia
