= Mount Tinniswood =

Mountain in British Columbia, Canada

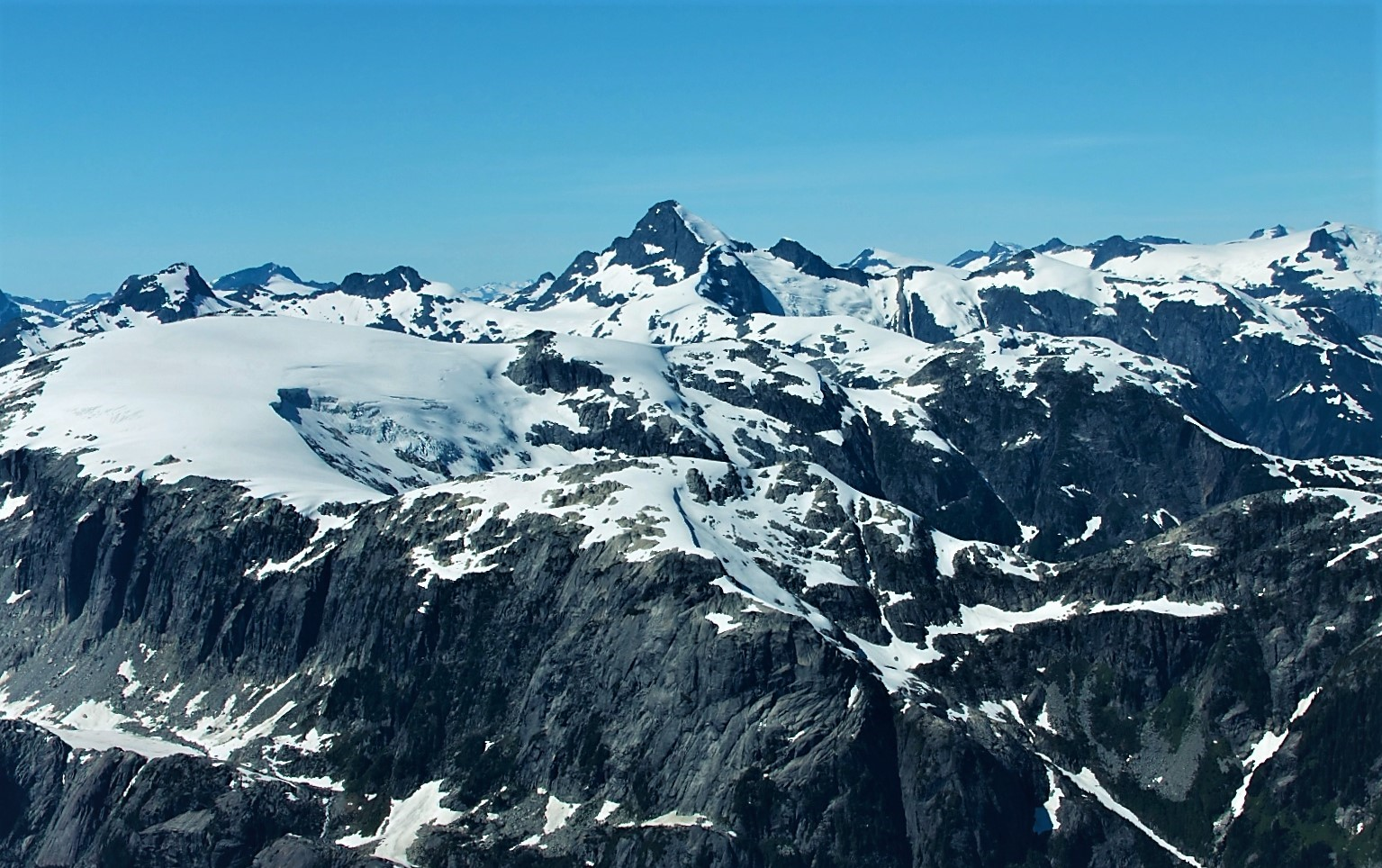
- Southeast aspect, centered at top

Highest point
- Elevation: 2,606 m (8,550 ft)
- Prominence: 1,016 m (3,333 ft)
- Parent peak: Mount Boardman (2,671 m)
- Isolation: 9.6 km (6.0 mi)
- Listing: Mountains of British Columbia
- Coordinates: 50°18′49″N 123°50′22″W

Naming
- Etymology: William Tinniswood Dalton

Geography
- Location within British Columbia Location within Canada
- Interactive map of Mount Tinniswood
- Location: British Columbia, Canada
- District: Lillooet Land District
- Parent range: Coast Mountains
- Topo map: NTS 92J5 Clendinning Creek

Climbing
- First ascent: 1941 (Dalton, Easthope)

Mount Tinniswood is a 2,606-metre (8,550-foot) mountain summit located in British Columbia, Canada.

== Description ==
Mount Tinniswood is a glaciated peak situated near Mount Albert at the head of Queens Reach of Jervis Inlet in the Coast Mountains, in a remote wilderness area that few visit. Mount Tinniswood is set 130 km (81 mi) north-northwest of Vancouver and 154 km (96 mi) southeast of Mount Waddington, the highest peak of the entire Coast Mountains range. Precipitation runoff and glacier meltwater from Mount Tinniswood drains to Jervis Inlet via Hunaechin Creek, and to Howe Sound via Sims Creek → Elaho River → Squamish River. Topographic relief is significant as the summit rises 2,360 meters (7,740 feet) above Hunaechin Creek in six kilometers (3.7 miles).

== History ==
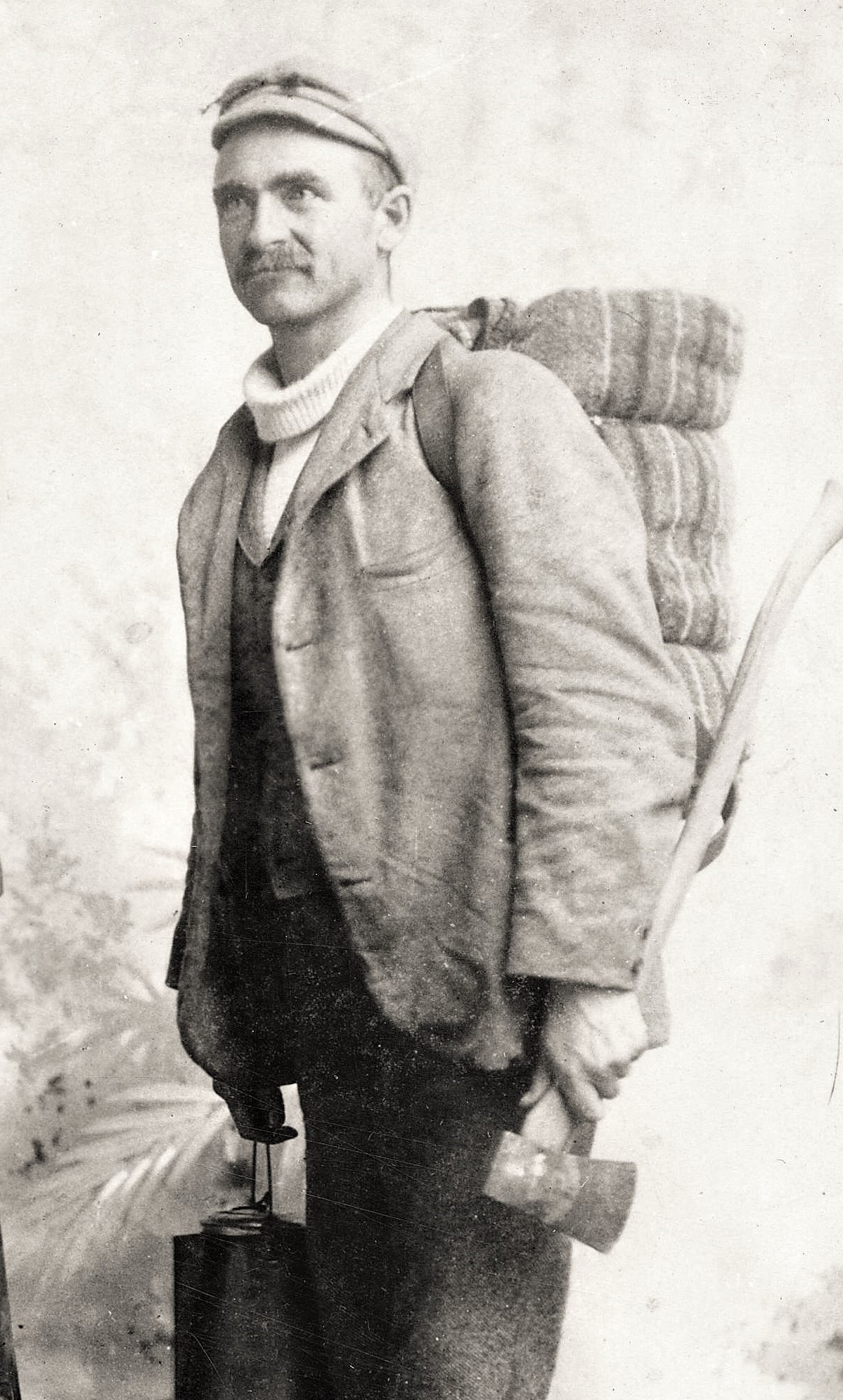
W.T. Dalton

The first ascent of the summit was made by Arthur Tinniswood Dalton and Percy Williams Easthope in 1941.

The mountain was named by Arthur Tinniswood Dalton and Percy Easthope to honor Arthur's father, William Tinniswood Dalton (1854–1931). Born in England and trained as a church architect in London, he designed many buildings in Vancouver after moving there from Winnipeg in 1889. He was an avid mountaineer and a member of the party credited with the first ascent of Mount Garibaldi in 1907.

The landform's toponym has been officially adopted by the Geographical Names Board of Canada.

== Climate ==
Based on the Köppen climate classification, Mount Tinniswood is located in a marine west coast climate zone of western North America. Most weather fronts originate in the Pacific Ocean, and travel east toward the Coast Mountains where they are forced upward by the range (Orographic lift), causing them to drop their moisture in the form of rain or snowfall. As a result, the Coast Mountains experience high precipitation, especially during the winter months in the form of snowfall. Temperatures can drop below −20 °C with wind chill factors below −30 °C. This climate supports the Tinniswood Glacier on the northwest slope.

== Gallery ==
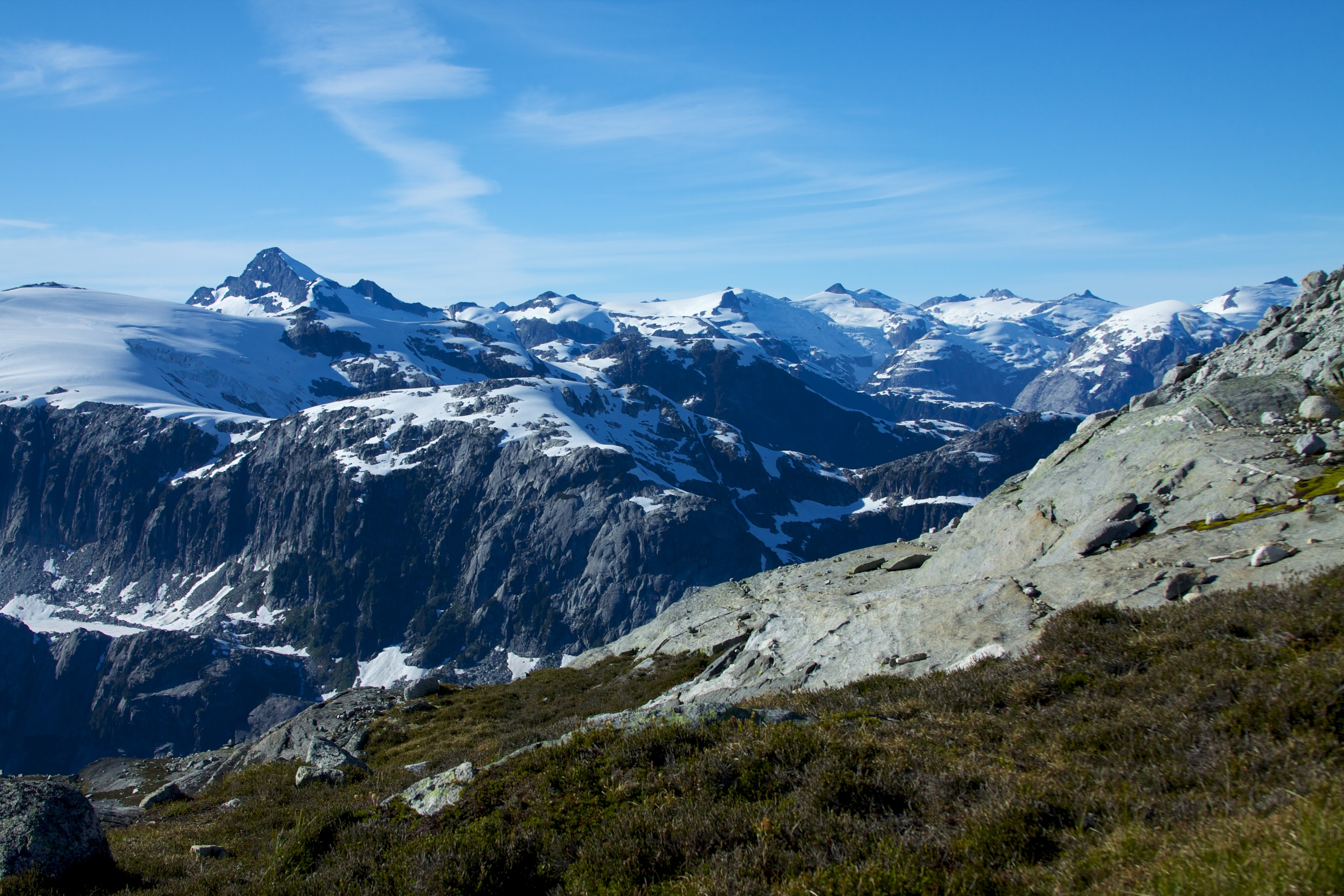
Tinniswood in upper left

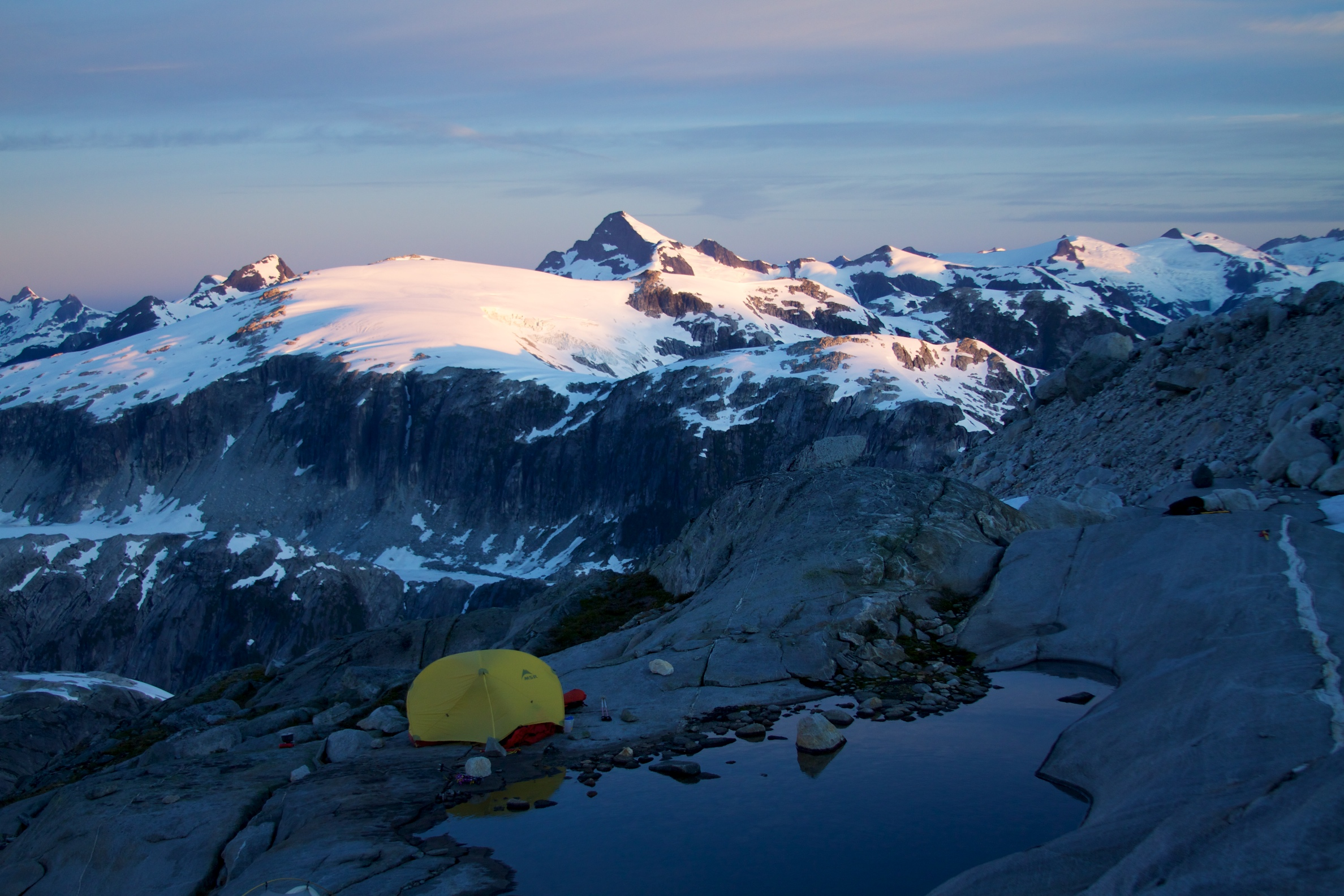
Tinniswood centered in the distance

== See also ==
- Geography of British Columbia
