= Tinniswood =

Tinniswood is a British surname.

== People with the surname ==
- Adrian Tinniswood (born 1954), English writer and historian
- John Tinniswood (1912–2024), British supercentenarian, oldest living man
- Peter Tinniswood (1936–2003), British writer

== See also ==
- Tinniswood Award
- Mount Tinniswood
- Keith Tenniswood
