= Clendinning Creek =

Location
- Country: Canada
- Province: British Columbia
- District: Lillooet Land District

Physical characteristics
- Source: Clendinning Lake
  - location: Clendinning Provincial Park, Clendinning Range, Pacific Ranges
  - coordinates: 50°27′55″N 123°52′54″W
  - elevation: 3,179 ft (969 m)
- Mouth: Elaho River
  - location: Clendinning Provincial Park
  - coordinates: 50°19′53″N 123°34′42″W
  - elevation: 1,071 ft (326 m)

Clendinning Creek is a river in British Columbia. It is the largest tributary of the Elaho River. It is located entirely within Clendinning Provincial Park.

Clendinning Creek is one of two popular whitewater kayak multi day trips in South West BC. Paddlers fly out of Green Lake in Whistler, it is usually a 2-day trip or can be combined with Fear Canyon on the Elaho to make a 3 days trip.

== Course ==
Clendinning Creek originates at the outlet of remote Clendinning Lake. It kicks off by briefly flowing northeast for about 1.4 km before turning southeast and flowing that way for about 26.2 km until it reaches the Elaho River.

== Tributaries ==
Clendinning Creek's only major (officially named) tributaries are Wave Creek and Jacobson Creek. Wave Creek enters the river where it turns from northeast to southeast, about 1.4 below the outlet of Clendinning Lake. Jacobson Creek enters the river about 1.7 miles above its confluence with the Elaho.

== See also ==
- List of rivers of British Columbia
