= Ashlu Falls =

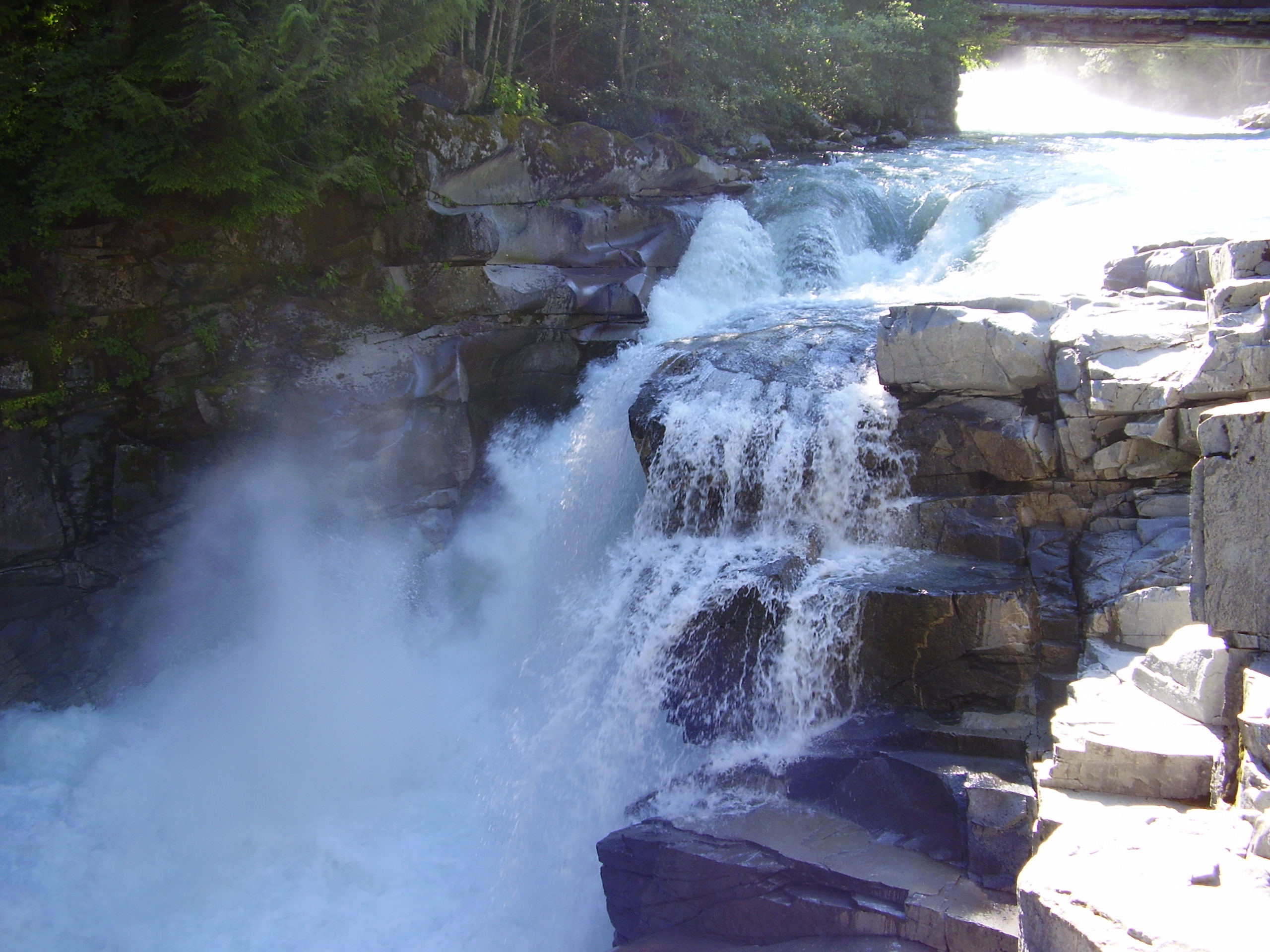
- Interactive map of Ashlu Falls
- Location: Northwest of Squamish
- Coordinates: 49°56′01″N 123°21′31″W
- Type: Tiered
- Total height: 33 feet (10 m)
- Number of drops: 2
- Longest drop: 20 feet (6.1 m)
- Total width: 108 feet (33 m)
- Watercourse: Ashlu Creek

Ashlu Falls is a short but significant waterfall along lower Ashlu Creek. The falls are located about 6 km above the mouth of Ashlu Creek and mark the head of Ashlu Canyon. The creek is actually crossed by a logging road bridge between the two tiers.

== Stature ==
Ashlu Falls stands a total of 33 feet in height. The upper drop is about 10 feet high & its width is over 10 times its height. The creek then flows under the bridge & bends before then dropping another 20 feet or so through a narrow chute into a deep pool. On the north side of the lower drop is a large section of sculptured rock that, when the creek is high, is completely covered with water, making the lower tier roughly as wide as the upper tier.

== See also ==
- List of waterfalls
- List of waterfalls in British Columbia
