= Mount Albert (British Columbia) =

Mountain in the country of Canada

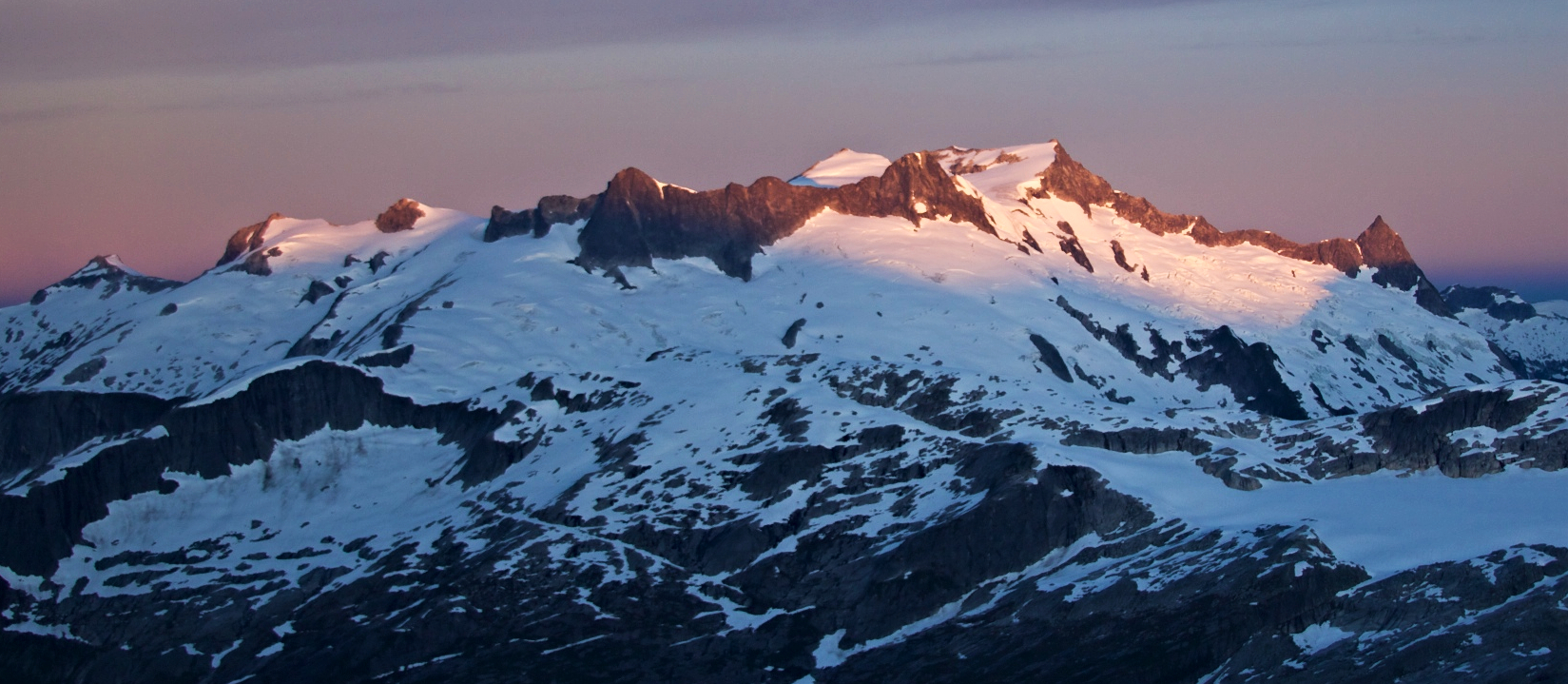
- Mount Albert, northeast aspect

Highest point
- Elevation: 2,552 m (8,373 ft)
- Prominence: 1,196 m (3,924 ft)
- Parent peak: Mount Tinniswood (2606 m)
- Listing: Mountains of British Columbia
- Coordinates: 50°14′01″N 123°52′36″W

Geography
- Location within British Columbia Location within Canada
- Interactive map of Mount Albert
- Location: British Columbia, Canada
- District: New Westminster Land District
- Parent range: Coast Mountains
- Topo map: NTS 92J4 Princess Louisa Inlet

Climbing
- First ascent: 1929 Arthur Dalton, Percy Williams Easthope

Mount Albert is a prominent 2,552-metre (8,373-foot) mountain located in the Coast Mountains of British Columbia, Canada. It is an isolated mountain situated at the head of Queens Reach of Jervis Inlet, 8 km (5.0 mi) northwest of Princess Louisa Inlet, in a remote wilderness area that few visit. Its nearest higher peak is Mount Tinniswood, 9.23 km (5.74 mi) to the north-northeast. Mount Albert is set 160 km (99 mi) southeast of Mount Waddington, the highest peak of the entire Coast Mountains range. The mountain was named in 1860 by Captain Richards to honor Prince Albert of Saxe-Coburg and Gotha (1819-1861), the husband of Queen Victoria. The name was officially adopted on May 6, 1924 when approved by the Geographical Names Board of Canada. The first ascent was made in 1929 by Arthur Tinniswood Dalton and Percy Williams Easthope.

== Climate ==
Based on the Köppen climate classification, Mount Albert is located in a marine west coast climate zone of western North America. Most weather fronts originate in the Pacific Ocean, and travel east toward the Coast Mountains where they are forced upward by the range (Orographic lift), causing them to drop their moisture in the form of rain or snowfall. As a result, the Coast Mountains experience high precipitation, especially during the winter months in the form of snowfall. Winter temperatures can drop below −20 °C with wind chill factors below −30 °C.

== Gallery ==
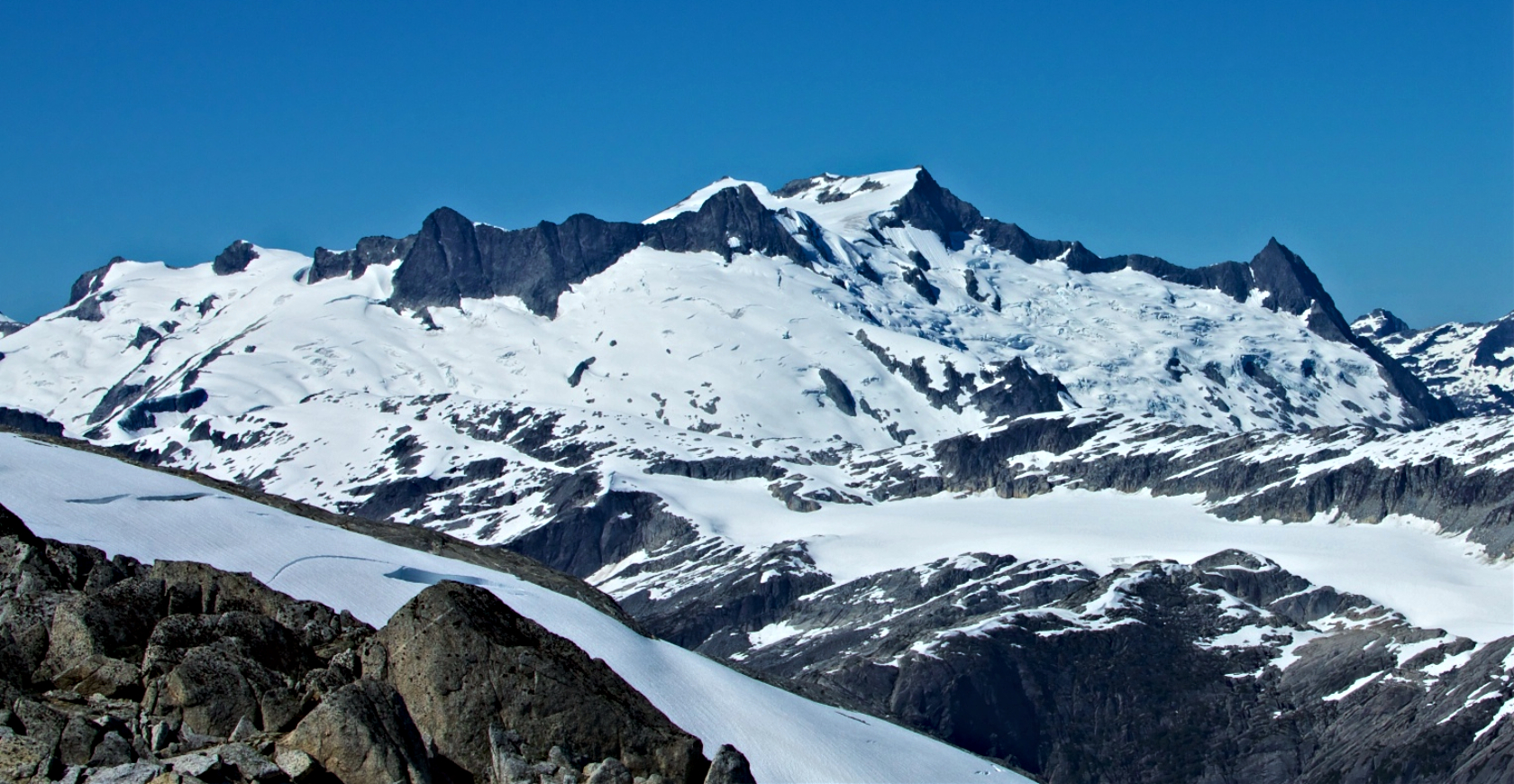
Mount Albert

== See also ==
- Geography of British Columbia
- Geology of British Columbia
- Royal eponyms in Canada
