= Skwelwil'em Squamish Estuary Wildlife Management Area =

Wildlife Management Area in British Columbia, Canada

- IUCN category IV (habitat/species management area)
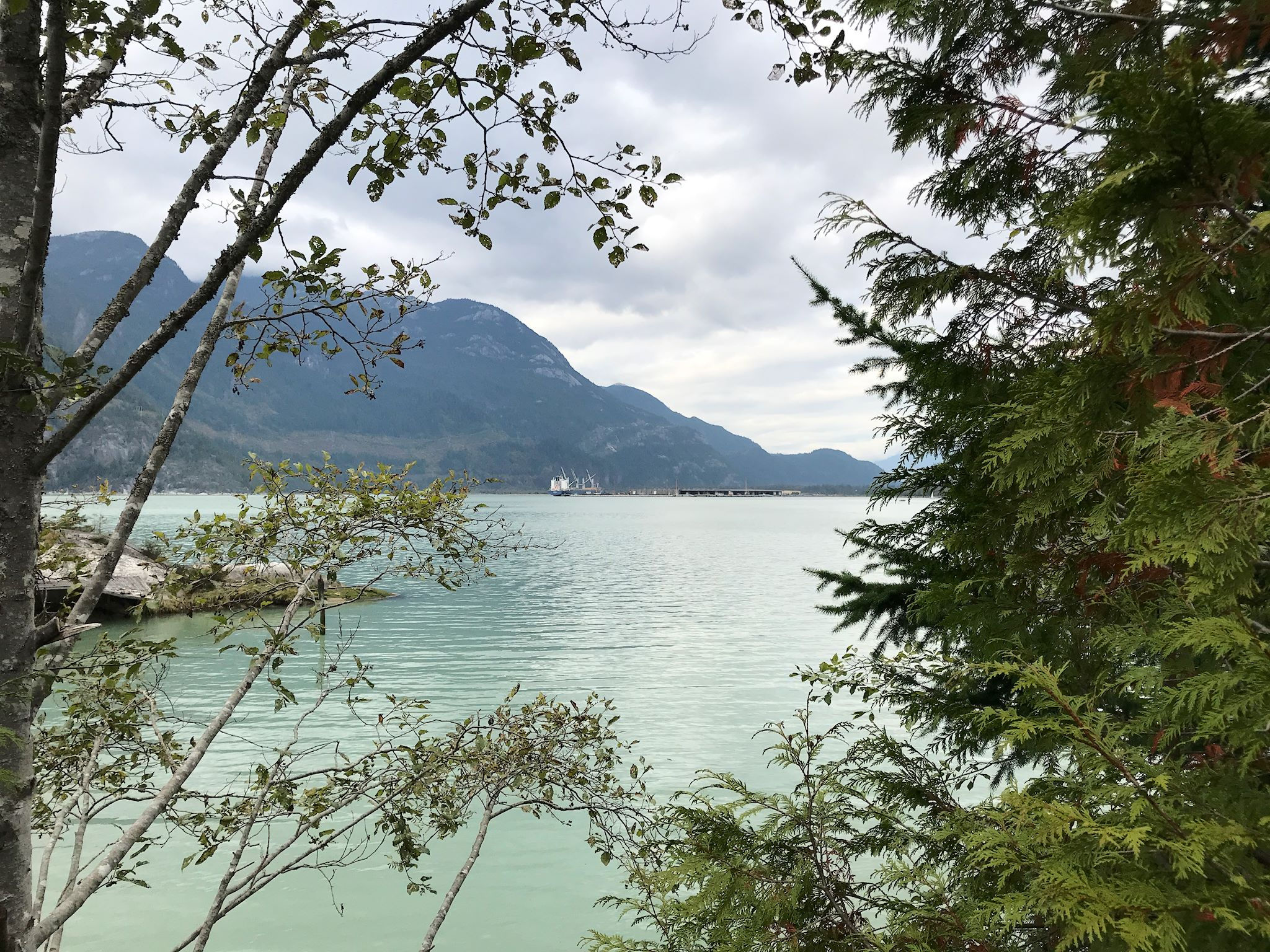
- A view out over the estuary of the Squamish River, British Columbia

- Location within British Columbia Location within Greater Vancouver Regional District
- Location: Squamish, British Columbia, Canada
- Coordinates: 49°42′46″N 123°10′12″W
- Area: 673 ha (1,660 acres)
- Designation: Wildlife Management Area
- Established: 28 February 2007
- Governing body: FLNRORD

The Skwelwil'em Squamish Estuary Wildlife Management Area is a wildlife management area on the south coast of British Columbia. It was established in 2007 for the management of fish species as well as terrestrial wildlife. The wildlife management area is on the traditional territory of Squamish Nation, which is involved in management of the area. The freshwater of the Squamish River mixes with the saltwater of Howe Sound, resulting in a varied ecosystem containing different habitats that support an abundance of wildlife. It also provides natural flood control for the Squamish town sites.

== Establishment ==
The Squamish Estuary has seen modification from human activities, both historically and in the present. Threats to the estuary stem from industrial development and human land usage, such as mercury contamination, accumulation of dredge spoils, and an oil spill in 2006. In the late 1970s, the Squamish River was at risk of being diverted for the construction of a proposed deep sea coal port. This was halted by the Department of Fisheries and Oceans. The Squamish Estuary Coordinating Committee was thereby formed in 1979 with the purpose of managing land and water uses of the Squamish Estuary with all involved parties' interests in mind.

As of February 2007, the Squamish Estuary is a designated wildlife management area under the Provincial Wildlife Act and is being managed under the 2007 Skwelwil'em Squamish Estuary Wildlife Management Plan.

== Management ==
The estuary has been historically managed by various organizations since its establishment in 1970, with a focus on local administration and protecting the species that reside within it. The management planning process for the Skwelwil'em Squamish Estuary Wildlife Management Area was carried out in collaboration with the Squamish Nation and with input from parties and sources such as the Squamish Estuary Management Committee, the Ministry of Environment, the BC Wildlife Act, and the Federal Migratory Birds Convention Act. The management goals for the territory are centered around the protection of fish and wildlife, usage of an integrated management approach and related research activities, and acknowledgement of the land's cultural significance to the Squamish First Nation.

=== Indigenous involvement ===
The estuary is situated upon the Squamish First Nation, with an agreement in place between them and the province of British Columbia aimed at ensuring a collaborative effort in managing the park, fostering active communications, developing proactive strategies, providing opportunities for the Squamish First Peoples to share their cultural heritage, and acknowledging the relevance of their community's stewardship and partnership initiatives.

== Ecology ==
The wildlife management area encompasses the delta of the Squamish River where it enters Howe Sound.

The Squamish Estuary mixes freshwater from the Squamish River with seawater, forming a unique ecosystem with high productivity and high biodiversity. It contains varied habitats such as marshes, mudflats, intertidal shores, seagrass beds, tidal streams, and barrier beaches. Its geographical features also contribute to water filtration and thus lead to a more pristine marine environment, as well as mitigating flood risks around the region.

=== Wildlife ===
The estuary provides important spawning grounds for salmon and other fishes, as well as terrestrial habitat for native mammals like cougars, beavers, black-tailed deer, and black bears. It is a critical resting and overwintering site for migratory birds and is suitable habitat for hundreds of bird species, making the estuary an area with high bird diversity. It is also home to reptilian and amphibian life.

Wintering bald eagles flock to the estuary from December to February to feed on spawning salmon. They are Canada's largest congregation of bald eagles and make up nearly 3% of the global bald eagle population. Salmon runs are also known to attract other waterfowl to the area, such as goldeneyes and mergansers.

Several species at risk or of special concern are protected by the wildlife management area. They include the bull trout, red-legged frog, peregrine falcon, and marbled murrelet.

=== Vegetation ===
The estuary is home to three distinct environments in terms of plant life: aquatic, estuarine, and terrestrial. Commonly seen vegetation includes aquatic phytoplankton and algae that thrive in the water, estuarine rushes and grasses in the salt marsh habitats, and terrestrial shrubs and forest vegetation typical of the Coastal Western Hemlock biogeoclimatic zone.

There are two plant species at risk: the Henderson's checker-mallow and Vancouver Island beggarticks.

=== Climate change ===
Estuary ecosystems are particularly vulnerable to the effects of climate change. Increasing temperatures cause sea levels to rise, which not only affects the geography of the estuary due to flooding, but also the salinity levels of the ecosystem due to changes in discharge. Climate change degrades threatens the habitats of native species and erodes plant communities.

== Human interaction ==
The Squamish estuary is an integral part of flood control for the Squamish town site. However, its physical and chemical composition has changed significantly due to human activity. In the 1970s, large quantities of dredge spoils material were deposited into the estuary for a proposed coal port that was blocked by the Department of Fisheries and Oceans and never constructed. Past industrial activity has also resulted in pollution; notably, a former chlor-alkali plant led to mercury contamination of sediments on the southeastern side of the wildlife management area, with most of the contamination residing beyond its boundaries.

Despite these issues, the Squamish Estuary Wildlife Management Area continues to act as an essential part of the local ecosystem and remains highly productive in protecting local wildlife. Although its primary purpose is to ensure a viable habitat for fauna and flora, recreational activities occur throughout the park too, including various trails, wind sports, and hunting and fishing with vehicular access available.
