= Ashlu Creek =

Location
- Country: Canada
- Province: British Columbia
- District: New Westminster Land District

Physical characteristics
- Source: An unnamed lake east of Mount Crerar
  - location: Pacific Ranges
  - coordinates: 50°5′17″N 123°37′19″W
  - elevation: 3,907 ft (1,191 m)
- Mouth: Squamish River
  - location: Northwest of Squamish
  - coordinates: 49°53′43″N 123°18′11″W
  - elevation: 118 ft (36 m)

Ashlu Creek is a short and swift river-like creek in British Columbia. It is a tributary of the Squamish River and enters it about 24.3 km northwest of Squamish.

== Course ==
Ashlu Creek, often called the "Ashlu River" (due to its size) or "the Ashlu", begins at the outlet of an unnamed lake east of Mount Crerar. From there all the way to its mouth, it flows southeast. Starting at Ashlu Falls is 3.9 km long Ashlu Canyon has several big rapids and large drops making it one of the best kayaking locations in the area. It ends about 2.1 km above the river's mouth.

== Hydroelectricity ==
A 49 megawatt run-of-river hydro installation below the canyon went online December 2009. A diversion weir 5 km above the power house feeds water down a bored tunnel to the site. It is owned by Innergex Renewable Energy and is expected to produce 265,000 MWh annually.

== Tributaries ==
Ashlu Creek's only major tributary is Tatlow Creek, which flows northeast from remote Tatlow Lake and joins the Ashlu about 15.8 km below its source. It does have several much smaller tributaries though:

- Shortcut Creek
- Snafu Creek
- Endell Creek
- Red Mountain Creek
- Pykett Creek
- Coin Creek
- Stuyvesedt Creek
- Roaring Creek
- Pokosha Creek
- Rob Creek
- Cassetta Creek
- Mowitch Creek
- Sigurd Creek

== See also ==
- List of rivers of British Columbia
