= Clendinning Range =

Coast Mountains' Pacific Ranges subrange

Coordinates: 50°25′00″N 123°55′00″W

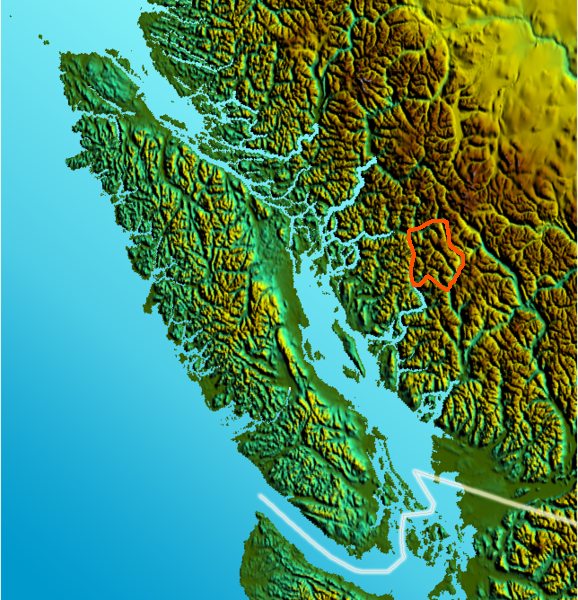
Location map of Clendinning Range

The Clendinning Range is a subrange of the Pacific Ranges of the Coast Mountains of British Columbia. About 1,500 km^{2} (580 sq mi) in area and lies to the northwest of the better-known Tantalus Range near Squamish. Heavily glaciated and very rugged, with severe weather year-round, it is between the valleys of the Elaho River (east) and the Toba River (west).
