= Elaho River =

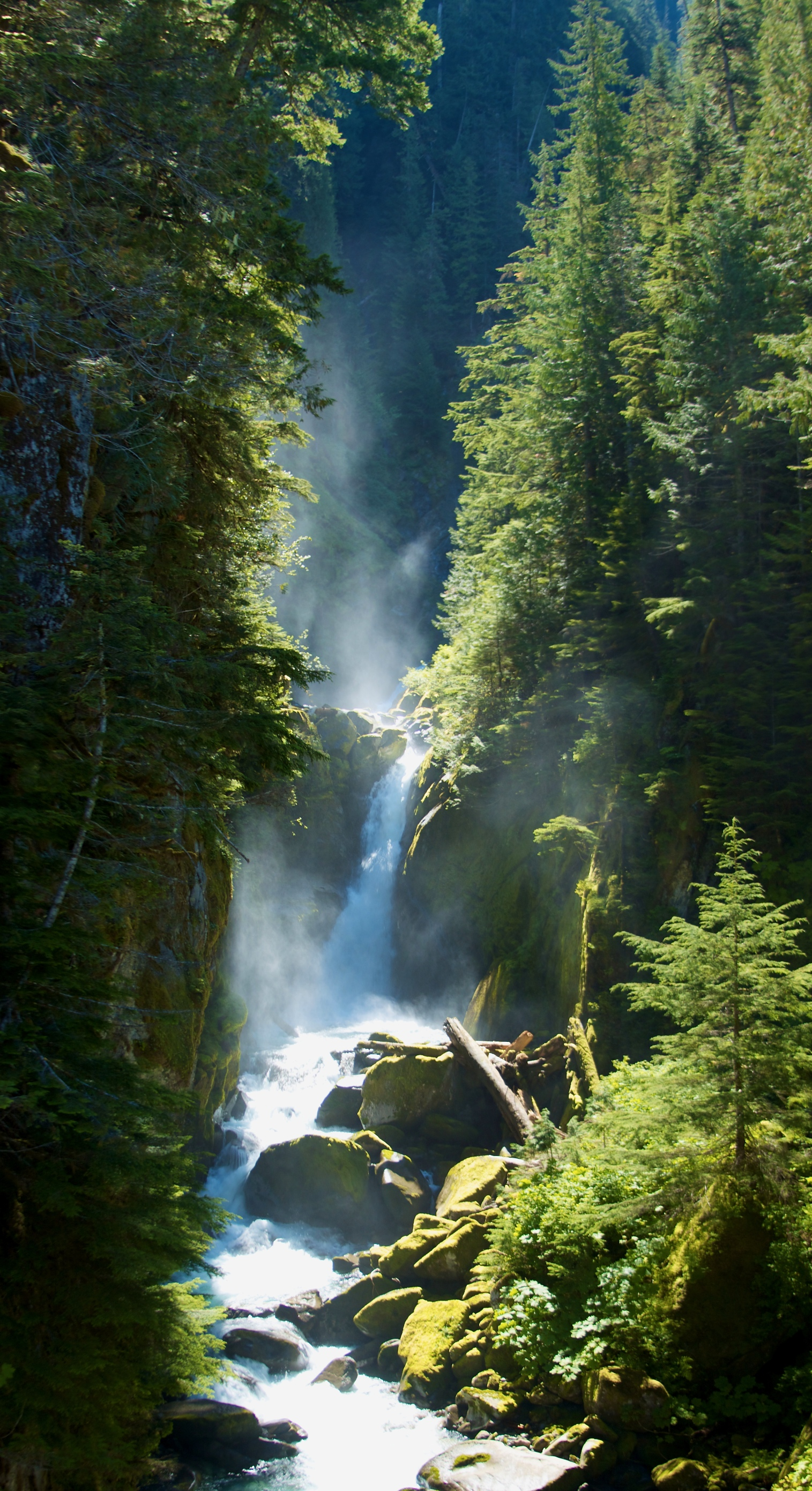

Location
- Country: Canada
- Province: British Columbia
- Districts: Lillooet Land District; New Westminster Land District

Physical characteristics
- Source: An unnamed lake at the toe of the Elaho Glacier
  - location: Pacific Ranges
  - coordinates: 50°30′53″N 123°39′59″W
  - elevation: 3,704 ft (1,129 m)
- Mouth: Squamish River
  - location: Near the Squamish River's source
  - coordinates: 50°06′34″N 123°23′10″W
  - elevation: 507 ft (155 m)
- Length: 70 km (43 mi)

The Elaho River is a c.70 km long river beginning in the Coast Mountains northwest of the towns of Whistler and Pemberton, British Columbia. It is a tributary of the Squamish River and is known for its whitewater rafting and kayaking as well as for the intense alpine scenery lining its route.

The Elaho is much larger than the Squamish River when it meets with it. The Elaho is often subject to flash flooding.

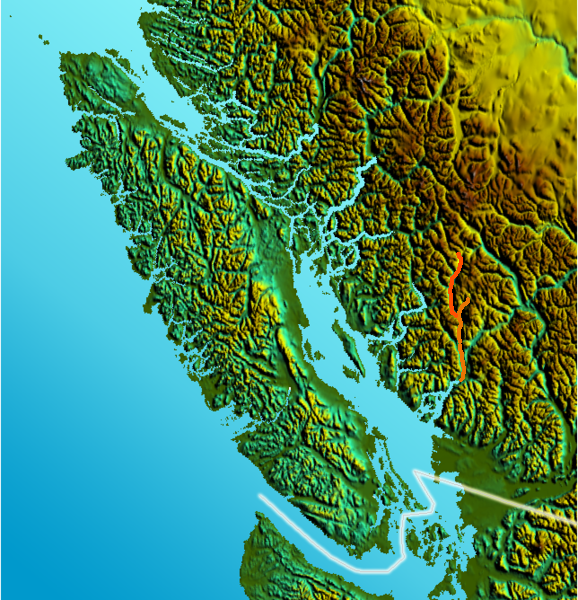
Location map of Elaho River; Squamish River shown in orange

== Course ==
The Elaho River originates at the outlet of an unnamed lake fed directly by the Elaho Glacier. The river starts off by flowing southeast for about 10.2 miles until its confluence with Marlow Creek, which flows from the Pemberton Icefield. The river turns south here and flows south here about 12.6 to its confluence with its largest tributary, Clendinning Creek. Between Marlow Creek and Clendinning Creek, the river flows through spectacular Elaho Canyon, a popular whitewater rafting section. From the Clendinning Creek confluence, the river continues south for another 8.9 km to its confluence with Sims Creek, its second largest tributary. After Sims Creek, the river turns southeast for about 21.4 km until its confluence with the Squamish.

== Tributaries ==
While Clendinning and Sims Creeks are the Elaho’s largest tributaries, the Elaho has many other smaller tributaries as well:

- Moose Pasture Creek
- Marlow Creek
- Jauques Pierre Creek
- Cesna Creek
- Lava Creek
- Sundown Creek
- Jarvis Creek
- Blakeney Creek
- Bierman Creek
- Ponor Creek
- Limelite Creek
- Maude Fricket Creek
- Shadow Creek
- Carol Creek

== See also ==
- List of rivers of British Columbia
