= Squamish River =

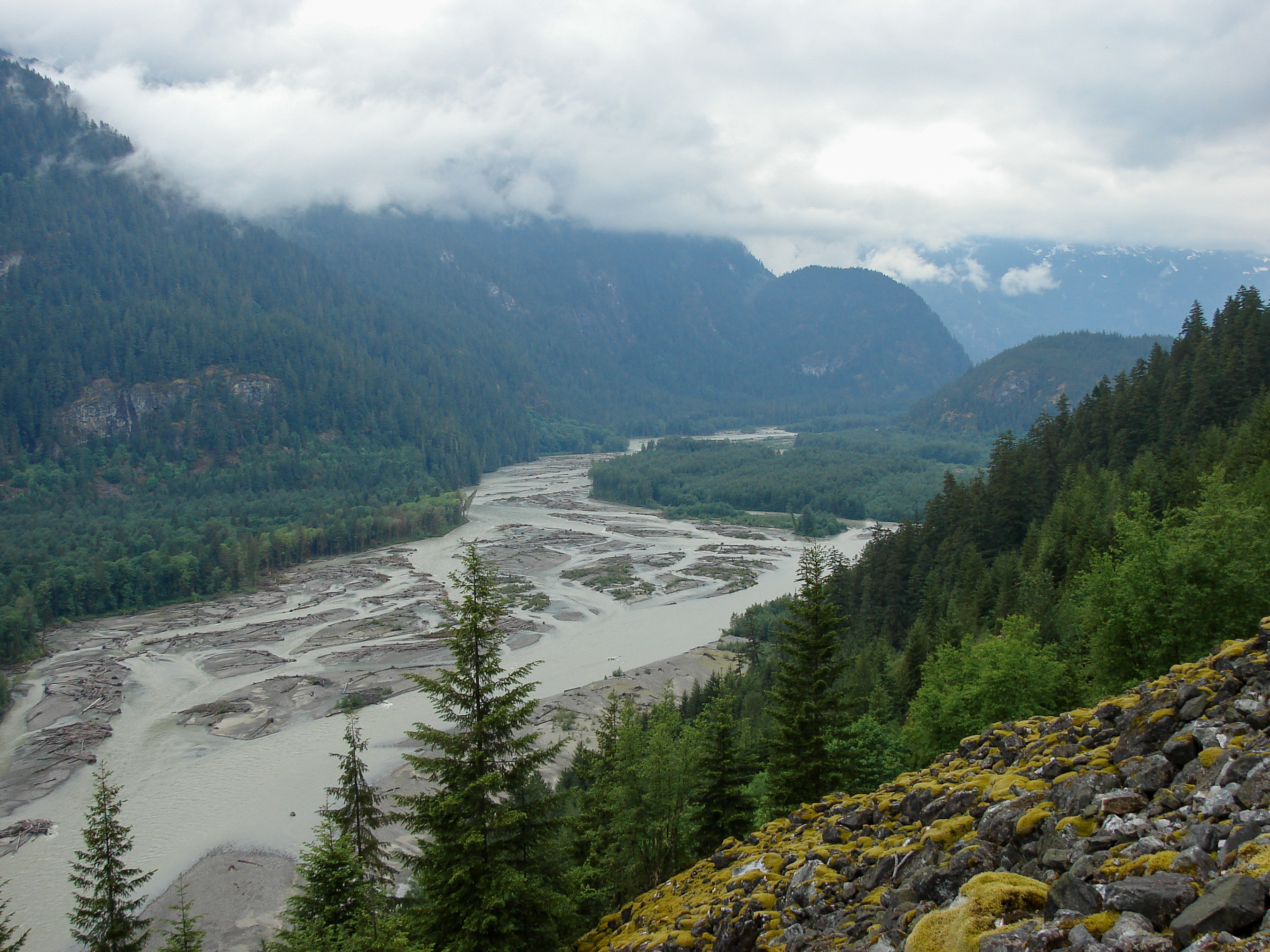
- Looking northwest up the Squamish River valley

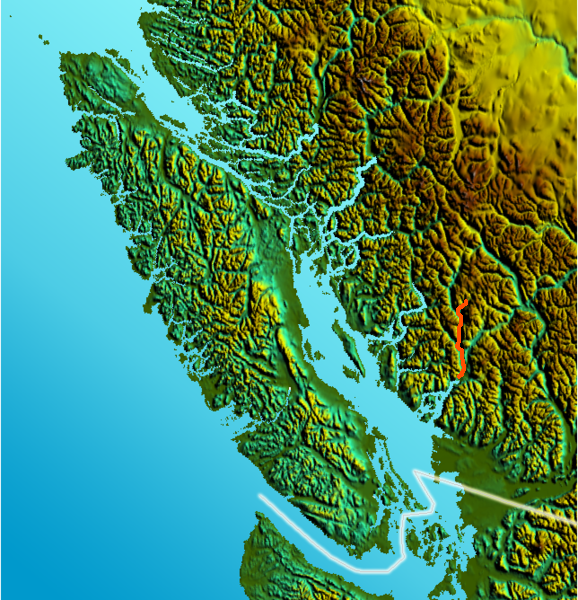
- Location of the Squamish River

- Location of mouth

Location
- Country: Canada
- Province: British Columbia
- District: New Westminster Land District
- City: Squamish

Physical characteristics
- Source: Pemberton Icefield
  - location: Pacific Ranges
  - coordinates: 50°17′48″N 123°53′19″W
  - elevation: 4,248 ft (1,295 m)
- Mouth: Howe Sound
  - location: Squamish
  - coordinates: 49°40′58″N 123°10′44″W
  - elevation: 0 ft (0 m)
- Length: 50 mi (80 km)

Basin features
- Tributaries
  - left: Cheakamus, Mamquam

The Squamish River is a short but very large river in the Canadian province of British Columbia. Its drainage basin is 3,328 square kilometres (1,285 sq mi) in size. The total length of the Squamish River is approximately 80 kilometres (50 mi).

== Course ==
The Squamish River drains a complex of basins in the Coast Mountains just north of Vancouver. Its flows generally south to the head of Howe Sound where the town of Squamish is located.

The Squamish River originates at the toe of the Pemberton Icefield. As it flows south from the glacier, it is joined by several more glacier fed tributaries. About 21.8 km southwest of the source, the Squamish meets the Elaho River. The Elaho River, which is the largest tributary of the Squamish, actually has more volume than the Squamish where they join. After its confluence with the Elaho, the river moves southeast for another 24.8 km until its confluence with the Ashlu River, its second largest tributary. Another 16.4 km from there, it is met by the Cheakamus River, and 4.7 km further south, by the Mamquam River. From there, the river flows another 6 km to its mouth at the head of the Howe Sound.

The Skwelwil'em Squamish Estuary Wildlife Management Area is located at the river mouth.

== See also ==
- List of rivers of British Columbia
- Squamish people
- Squamish Nation
- The Barrier
- Mount Cayley volcanic field
