= Alice Ridge =

Mountain ridge in British Columbia, Canada

Coordinates: 49°48′06″N 123°03′36″W

Alice Ridge is a mountain ridge in the Garibaldi Ranges of the Pacific Ranges in southwestern British Columbia, Canada. It is located just outside of Garibaldi Provincial Park on the east side of the Cheekye River southwest of Mount Garibaldi in New Westminster Land District. It was originally gazetted as Cheekye Ridge on September 12, 1972, but was changed to Alice Ridge on January 30, 1981, due to it being the established local name.
