= Cheekye =

- Location of Cheekye in British Columbia
- Coordinates: 49°48′00″N 123°09′00″W
- Country: Canada
- Province: British Columbia
- Area codes: 250, 778

Cheekye is an unincorporated locality on the Cheakamus River just upstream from its confluence with its parent stream, the Squamish, and just north of Brackendale, British Columbia, which is part of the District of Squamish, British Columbia, Canada.

Formerly a passenger station on the Pacific Great Eastern Railway and home to a fishing lodge and cabins, it was named for the Cheekye River and had a post office from October 16, 1924 to August 8, 1931. It is the location of the only bridge across the Cheakamus River below the abandoned settlement of Garibaldi, leading to two roads, one northeast to the Paradise Valley neighbourhood, which lies along the Cheakamus below its canyon, and also to the main road up the Squamish Valley, leading to various Indian Reserves of the Squamish Nation and beyond to the valleys of the Elaho and other tributaries of the Squamish.
