= Round Mountain (British Columbia) =

Mountain in British Columbia, Canada

- Location within British Columbia
- Interactive map of Round Mountain

Highest point
- Elevation: 1,646 m (5,400 ft)
- Prominence: 225 m (738 ft)
- Coordinates: 49°45′53.5″N 123°01′27.1″W

Geography
- Location: British Columbia, Canada
- District: New Westminster Land District
- Parent range: Garibaldi Ranges
- Topo map: NTS 92G14 Cheakamus River

Geology
- Rock age: Pleistocene
- Mountain type: Outcrop
- Last eruption: Pleistocene

Climbing
- Easiest route: gravel road

Round Mountain is an eroded volcanic outcrop in the Garibaldi Volcanic Belt in British Columbia, Canada, located 8 km southwest of Eanastick Meadows, 9 km (6 mi) east of Brackendale and 10 km (6 mi) south of Mount Garibaldi. It is the highpoint of Paul Ridge and is located in the southwest corner of Garibaldi Provincial Park. Round Mountain formed as a result of subduction of the Juan de Fuca Plate beneath the North American Plate, known as the Cascadia subduction zone. Round Mountain last erupted during the Pleistocene.

== See also ==
- Cascade Volcanoes
- Garibaldi Volcanic Belt
- List of volcanoes in Canada
- Volcanism of Canada
- Volcanism of Western Canada
