= Cheekye Fan =

Landslide feature

The Cheekye Fan is a large landslide feature located in southwestern British Columbia, Canada, at the head of Howe Sound. The fan has an area of around 25 square kilometers. It was formed by collapse on the west flank of the volcano Mount Garibaldi, which was constructed over a glacier during the Late Pleistocene period.

It has been hypothesized that the Cheekye Fan can be separated into two quasi-homogenous populations: those that are typically triggered by relatively small debris avalanches, slumps, or rock falls or simply by progressive bulking of in-stream erodible sediments; and those that are thought to result from transformation of rock avalanches.

== Human development ==
The Cheekye fan is considered to be a desirable location for land development however this was prevented due to many (around 10) engineering studies finding unacceptable levels of potential landslide risk. However (Jakob & Friele, 2010) potentially showed that debris flows exceeding 3 million meters cubed are unlikely to reach the Cheekye fan as a result of limited water available to fully fluidize a rock avalanche. Their research also showed that in order to come up with reasonable estimates for the frequency and magnitude of debris flows on complex alluvial fan structures, efforts from multiple field of study are needed.
