= Paradise Valley, British Columbia =

Paradise Valley
- Location of Paradise Valley in British Columbia
- Coordinates: 49°48′00″N 123°09′00″W
- Country: Canada
- Province: British Columbia
- Area codes: 250, 778

Paradise Valley is a rural-residential area north of Brackendale, British Columbia, Canada, located along the right (west) bank of the Cheakamus River. It begins just below that river's canyon, and continues downstream towards Cheekye, where the road from Brackendale crosses the Cheakamus. Located to the southwest of Brohm Lake, which is in the rocky upland on the other side of the Cheakamus and adjacent to BC Highway 99, it is largely flat and a floodplain and is home to the main facility of the Coast Mountain Outdoor School as well as the C-Dar Lodge Biodynamic facility. Many Paradise Valley residents participate at the weekly farmers market in nearby Squamish.
