= Cheekye River =

River in British Columbia, Canada

Coordinates: 49°48′00″N 123°09′00″W

Cheekye River Ch’kay Stakw
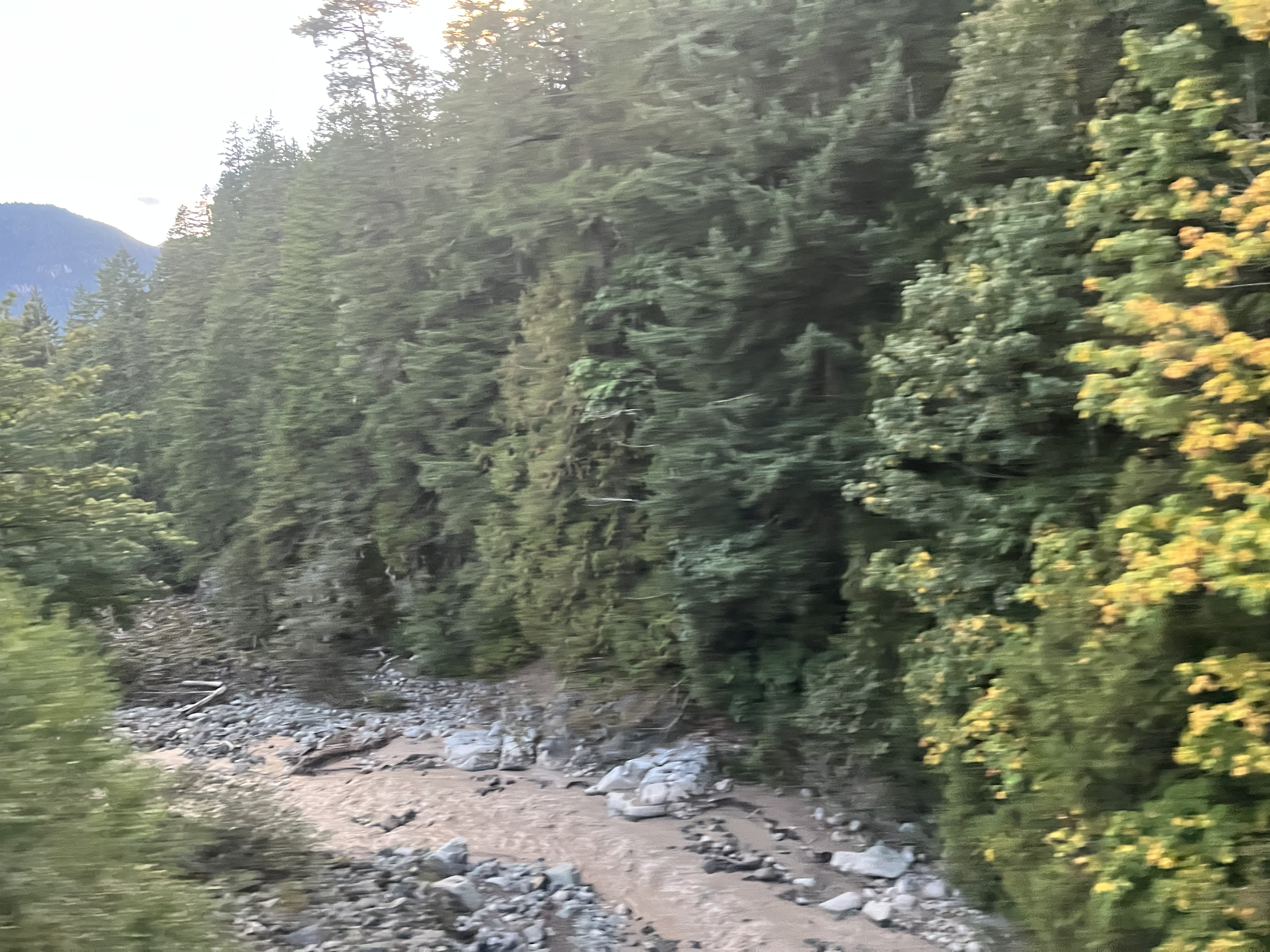
- Cheekye River

Location
- Country: Canada
- Province: British Columbia
- District: New Westminster Land District

Physical characteristics
- Source: West face of Mount Garibaldi
  - location: Garibaldi Ranges
  - elevation: 2,700 m (8,900 ft)
- Mouth: Cheakamus River
  - elevation: 50 m (160 ft)
- Basin size: 60 km^{2} (23 sq mi)

Basin features
- Tributaries
  - right: Brohm River

The Cheekye River is a tributary of the Cheakamus River in southwestern British Columbia, Canada. It begins near the west face of Mount Garibaldi and flows generally westward, under Highway 99 until it joins the Cheakamus River at Cheekye, north of Squamish.

== See also ==
- List of rivers of British Columbia
