= Kwoiek Needle =

Mountain in British Columbia, Canada

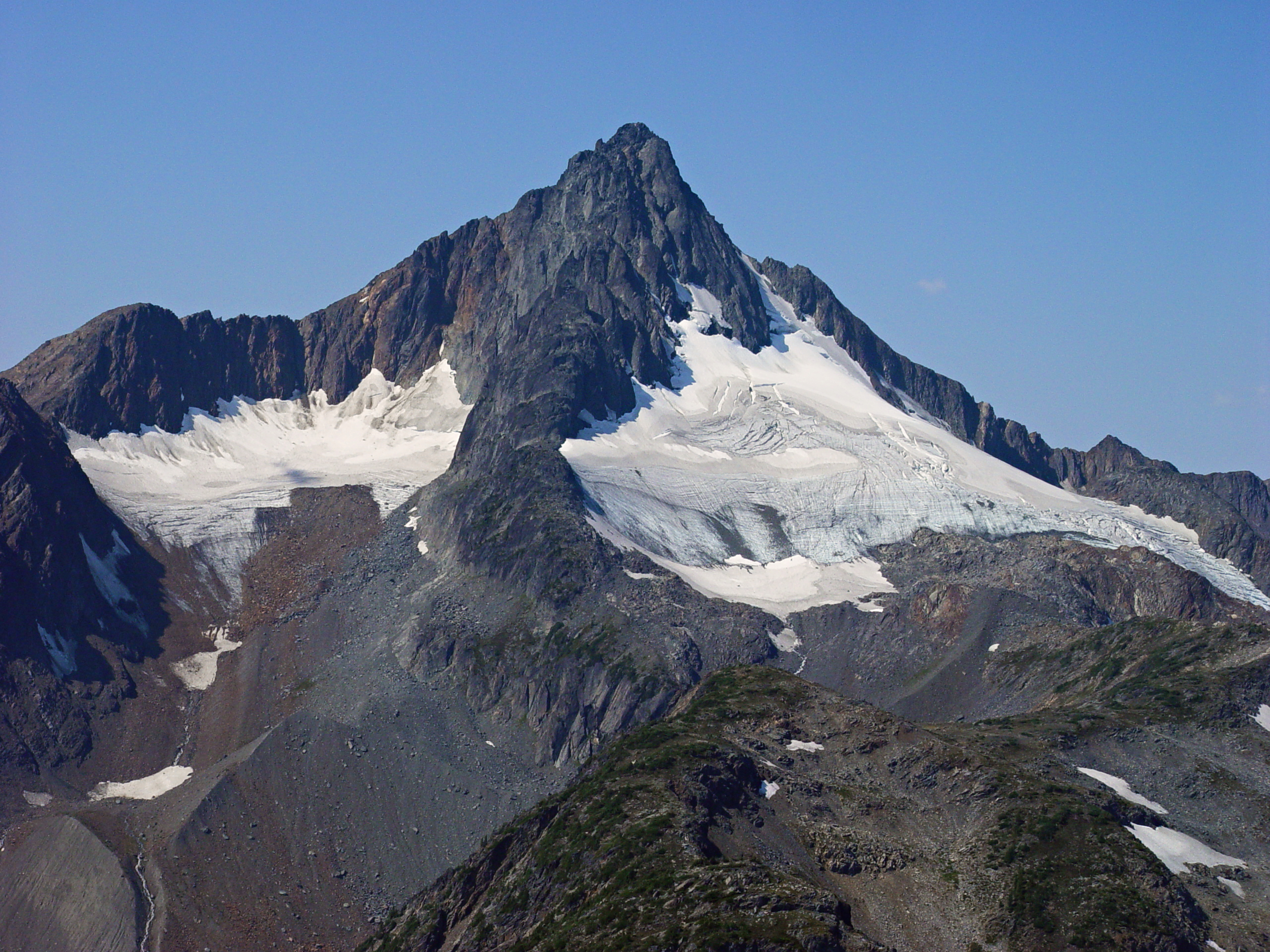
- Kwoiek Needle, northeast aspect

Highest point
- Elevation: 2,625 m (8,612 ft)
- Prominence: 595 m (1,952 ft)
- Parent peak: Kumkan Peak (2,742 m)
- Listing: Mountains of British Columbia
- Coordinates: 50°05′05″N 121°48′27″W

Geography
- Location within British Columbia Location within Canada
- Interactive map of Kwoiek Needle
- Country: Canada
- Province: British Columbia
- District: Yale Division Yale Land District
- Parent range: Lillooet Ranges; Coast Ranges
- Topo map: NTS 92I4 Lytton

Geology
- Rock age: Cretaceous
- Rock type: granodiorite

Climbing
- First ascent: 1890
- Easiest route: Scramble

Kwoiek Needle is a 2,625-metre (8,612-foot) mountain summit located in the Lillooet Ranges of southwestern British Columbia, Canada. It is situated 24 km (15 mi) southwest of Lytton, and its nearest higher peak is Kumkan Peak, 9.2 km (6 mi) to the west. The mountain was named in association with Kwoiek Creek, Kwoiek Lake, and Kwoiek Peak. Kwoiek is a Thompson Indian word meaning "gouged out," referring to a large chunk missing from the canyon wall. The name was officially adopted on October 6, 1936, by the Geographical Names Board of Canada. Meltwater from unnamed glaciers on its north slopes and precipitation runoff from the peak drains into Kwoiek Creek and Log Creek, both tributaries of the Fraser River.

== Climate ==
Based on the Köppen climate classification, Kwoiek Needle is located in a subarctic climate zone of western North America. Most weather fronts originate in the Pacific Ocean, and travel east toward the Coast Mountains where they are forced upward by the range (Orographic lift), causing them to drop their moisture in the form of rain or snowfall. As a result, the Coast Mountains experience high precipitation, especially during the winter months in the form of snowfall. Winter temperatures can drop below −20 °C with wind chill factors below −30 °C. The months July through September offer the most favorable weather for climbing Kwoiek Needle.

== Climbing Routes ==
Established climbing routes on Kwoiek Needle:

- West Ridge - class 3
- Southeast Ridge - class 4
- Southwest Ridge - class 3
- Northwest Ridge - class 4

== Gallery ==
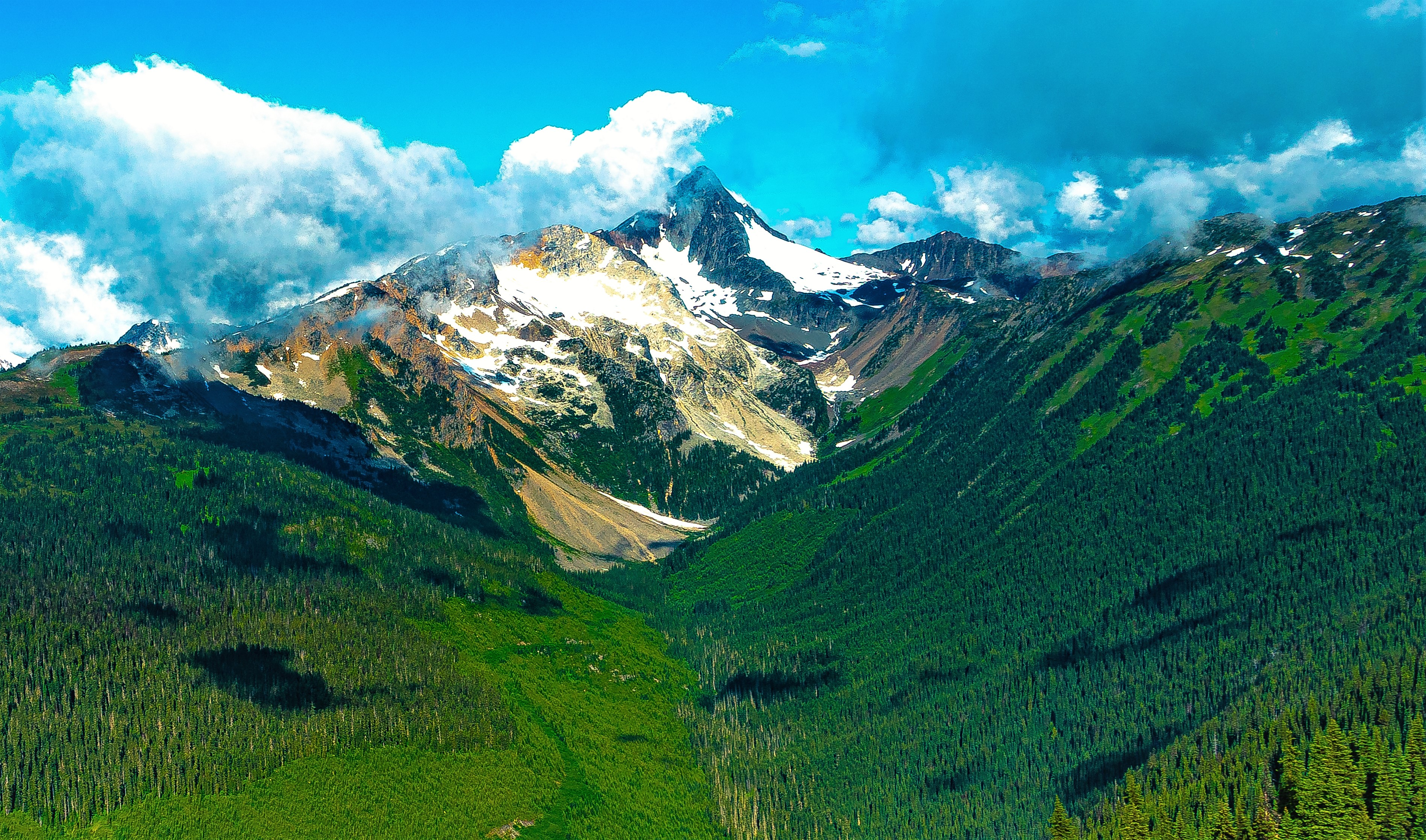
Aerial view, east aspect

== See also ==
- Geography of British Columbia
- Geology of British Columbia
