= Kwoiek Peak =

Mountain in British Columbia, Canada

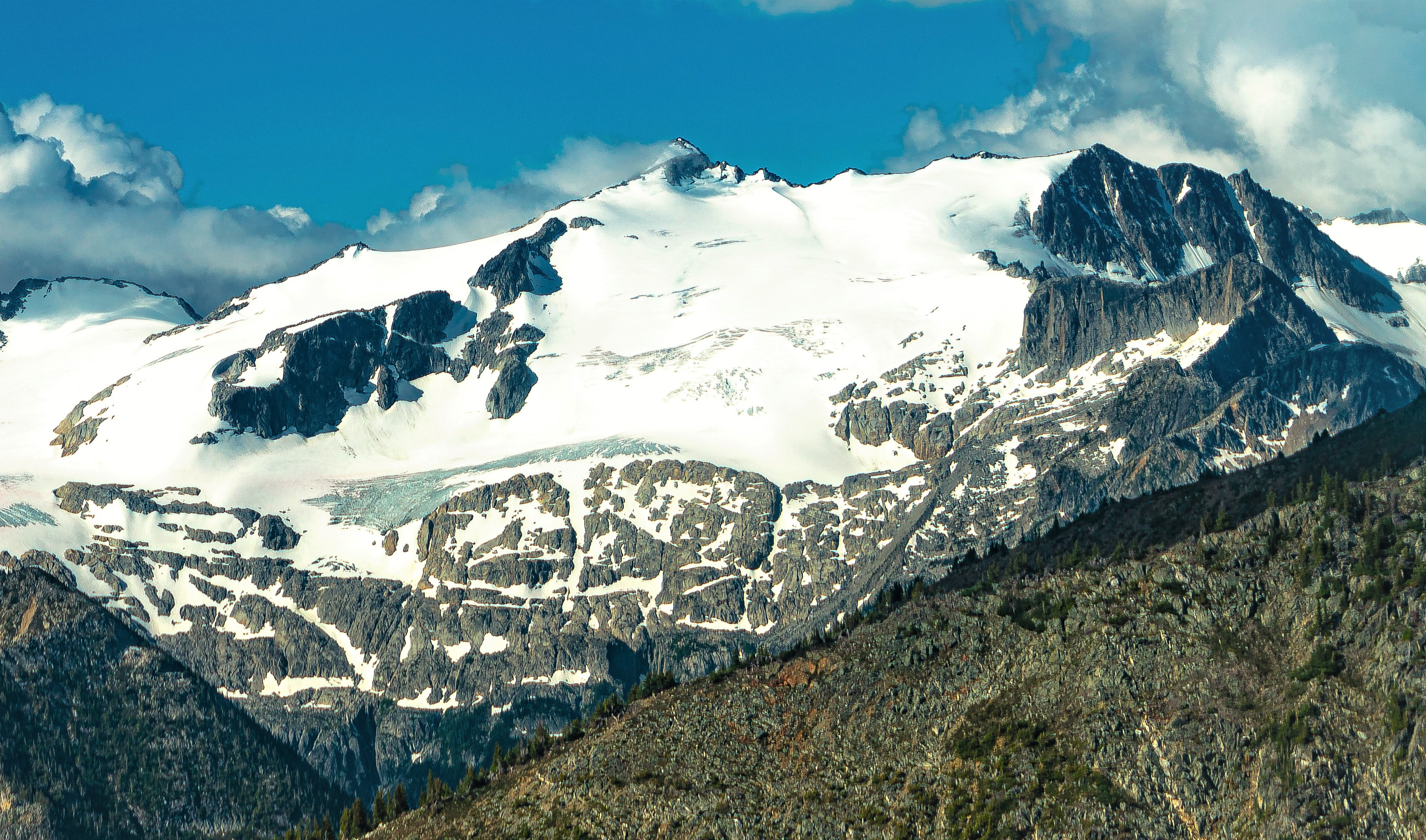
- North aspect, aerial view

Highest point
- Elevation: 2,736 m (8,976 ft)
- Prominence: 276 m (906 ft)
- Parent peak: Kumkan Peak (2,742 m)
- Isolation: 2.31 km (1.44 mi)
- Listing: Mountains of British Columbia
- Coordinates: 50°05′27″N 121°57′31″W

Geography
- Location within British Columbia Location within Canada
- Interactive map of Kwoiek Peak
- Country: Canada
- Province: British Columbia
- District: Kamloops Division Yale Land District
- Protected area: Stein Valley Nlaka'pamux Heritage Park
- Parent range: Lillooet Ranges; Coast Mountains
- Topo map: NTS 92I4 Lytton

Climbing
- First ascent: Topographical Survey

Kwoiek Peak is a 2,736-metre (8,976-foot) mountain summit located in British Columbia, Canada.

== Description ==
This remote glaciated peak is situated 31 km (19 mi) southwest of Lytton on the southern boundary of Stein Valley Nlaka'pamux Heritage Park. It is part of the Lillooet Ranges of the Coast Mountains and the nearest higher neighbor is Kumkan Peak, 2.35 km (1 mi) to the southeast. Meltwater from the Kwoiek Glacier on the northeast slope drains into Stukolait Lake → Kwoiek Creek → Fraser River; the Rutledge Glacier on the west slope drains to Rutledge Creek → Stein River → Fraser River; and precipitation runoff from the peak's south slope drains to Mehatl Creek → Nahatlatch River → Fraser River. Topographic relief is significant as the summit rises 1,300 metres (4,265 ft) above Stukolait Lake in 3 km (1.9 mi).

== Etymology ==
The mountain is named in association with Kwoiek Creek, Kwoiek Lake, and Kwoiek Needle. Kwoiek is a Thompson Indian word meaning "gouged out," referring to a large chunk missing from the canyon wall. The toponym was officially adopted on March 31, 1917, by the Geographical Names Board of Canada.

== Climate ==
Based on the Köppen climate classification, Kwoiek Peak is located in a subarctic climate zone of western North America. Most weather fronts originate in the Pacific Ocean, and travel east toward the Coast Mountains where they are forced upward by the range (Orographic lift), causing them to drop their moisture in the form of rain or snowfall. As a result, the Coast Mountains experience high precipitation, especially during the winter months in the form of snowfall. Winter temperatures can drop below −20 °C with wind chill factors below −30 °C. This climate supports the Kwoiek and Rutledge glaciers surrounding the peak. The months July through September offer the most favorable weather for climbing Kwoiek Peak.

== See also ==
- Kwoiek Needle
- Geography of British Columbia
