= Haynon Peak =

Mountain in British Columbia, Canada

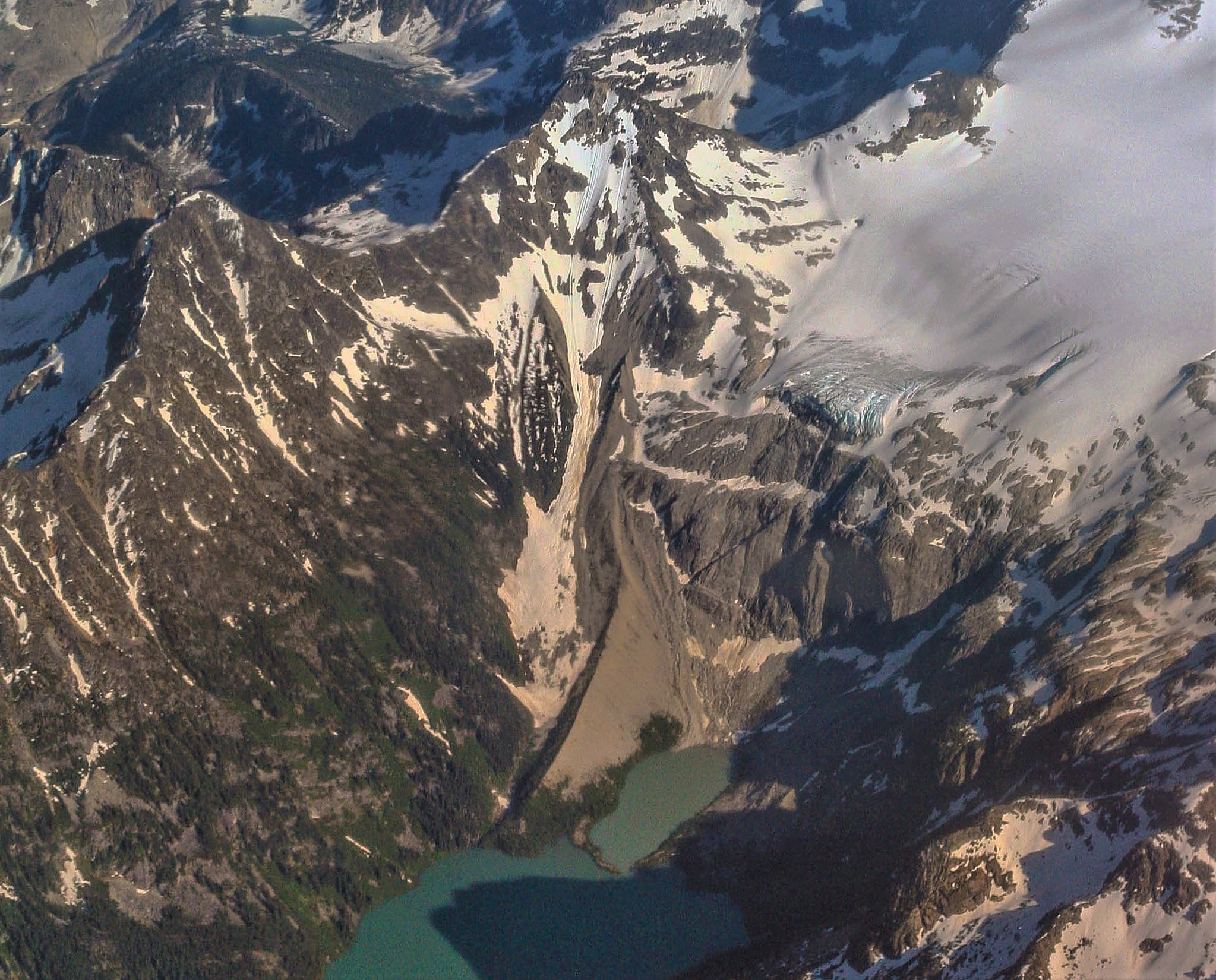
- Northwest aspect with Stukolait Lake

Highest point
- Elevation: 2,493 m (8,179 ft)
- Prominence: 279 m (915 ft)
- Parent peak: Kumkan Peak (2,742 m)
- Isolation: 2.47 km (1.53 mi)
- Listing: Mountains of British Columbia
- Coordinates: 50°05′51″N 121°54′36″W

Geography
- Location within British Columbia Location within Canada
- Interactive map of Haynon Peak
- Country: Canada
- Province: British Columbia
- District: Kamloops Division Yale Land District
- Parent range: Lillooet Ranges; Coast Mountains
- Topo map: NTS 92I4 Lytton

Climbing
- First ascent: 1958

Haynon Peak is a 2,493-metre (8,179-foot) mountain summit located in British Columbia, Canada.

== Description ==
This remote peak is situated 31 km (19 mi) southwest of Lytton. It is part of the Lillooet Ranges of the Coast Mountains and the nearest higher neighbor is Kumkan Peak, 3.18 km (2 mi) to the southwest. Precipitation runoff from the peak's slopes drains into Chochiwa and Kwoiek creeks, thence the Fraser River. Topographic relief is significant as the summit rises 1,050 metres (3,445 ft) above Stukolait Lake in 1.5 km (0.93 mi) and 700 metres (2,297 ft) above Haynon Lake in 1 km (0.62 mi). The first ascent of the summit was made in August 1958 by four members of the British Columbia Mountaineering Club: Dick Culbert, Art Dellow, Roy Mason, and Ralph Hutchinson.

== Etymology ==
The mountain is named in association with Haynon Lake. Haynon is a Thompson Indian word meaning "magpie" which is common here. The toponym was officially adopted on March 3, 1960, by the Geographical Names Board of Canada.

== Climate ==
Based on the Köppen climate classification, Haynon Peak is located in a subarctic climate zone of western North America. Most weather fronts originate in the Pacific Ocean, and travel east toward the Coast Mountains where they are forced upward by the range (Orographic lift), causing them to drop their moisture in the form of rain or snowfall. As a result, the Coast Mountains experience high precipitation, especially during the winter months in the form of snowfall. Winter temperatures can drop below −20°C with wind chill factors below −30°C. This climate supports the Kwoiek Glacier southwest of the peak. The months of July through September offer the most favorable weather for climbing Haynon Peak.

== Gallery ==
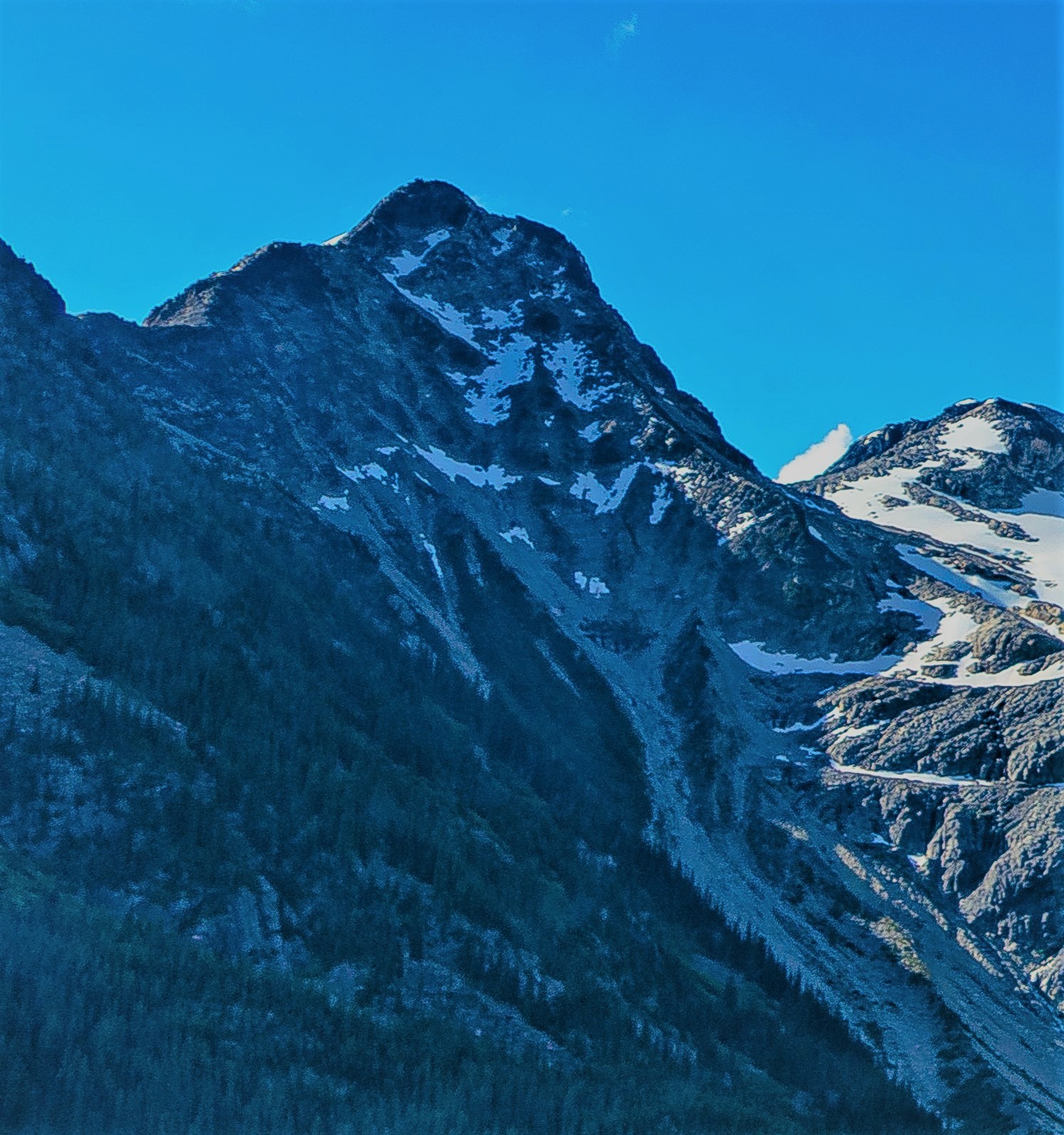
North aspect

== See also ==
- Geography of British Columbia
