= Kumkan Peak =

Mountain in British Columbia, Canada

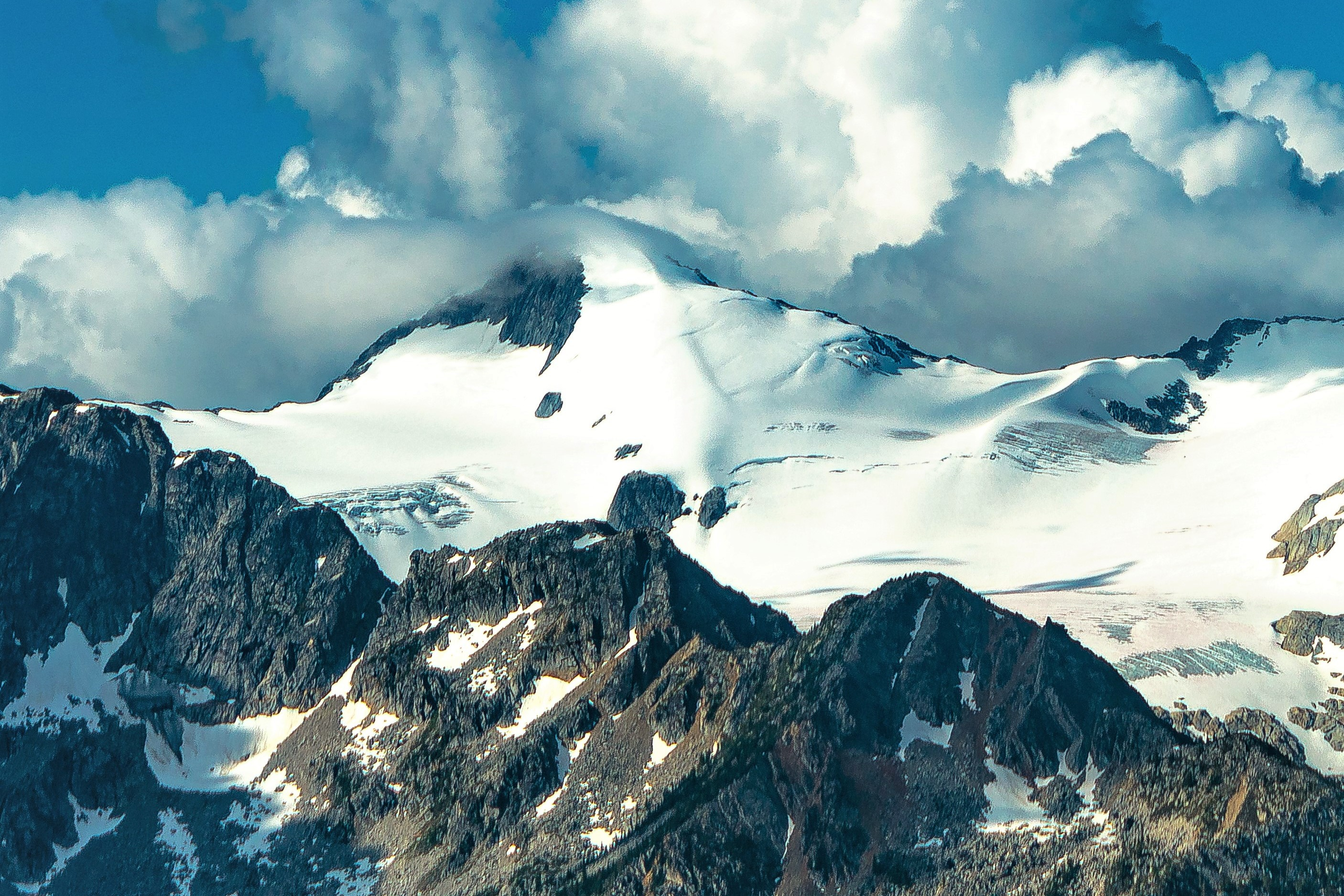
- North aspect, aerial view

Highest point
- Elevation: 2,742 m (8,996 ft)
- Prominence: 608 m (1,995 ft)
- Parent peak: Skihist Mountain (2,968 m)
- Isolation: 12.21 km (7.59 mi)
- Listing: Mountains of British Columbia
- Coordinates: 50°04′29″N 121°56′14″W

Geography
- Location within British Columbia Location within Canada
- Interactive map of Kumkan Peak
- Country: Canada
- Province: British Columbia
- District: Kamloops Division Yale Land District
- Parent range: Lillooet Ranges; Coast Mountains
- Topo map: NTS 92I4 Lytton

Climbing
- First ascent: 1958

Kumkan Peak is a 2,742-metre (8,996-foot) mountain summit located in British Columbia, Canada.

== Description ==
This remote glaciated peak is situated 31 km (19 mi) southwest of Lytton and is part of the Lillooet Ranges of the Coast Mountains. The nearest neighbor is Kwoiek Peak 2.35 km (1.46 mi) to the northwest and the nearest higher neighbor is Skihist Mountain, 12.82 km (8 mi) to the north. Meltwater from the Kwoiek Glacier on the north slope drains into Kwoiek Creek, thence Fraser River, and precipitation runoff from the peak's south slope drains into headwaters of Mehatl Creek → Nahatlatch River → Fraser River. Topographic relief is significant as the summit rises 1,240 metres (4,068 ft) above Mehatl Creek in 2 km (1.2 mi). The first ascent of the summit was made August 16, 1958, by four members of the British Columbia Mountaineering Club: Dick Culbert, Art Dellow, Roy Mason, and Ralph Hutchinson.

== Etymology ==
The mountain's name is the traditional name for "head", presumably a reference to the peak's position at the head of the Kwoiek Creek watershed. The toponym was officially adopted on April 3, 1950, by the Geographical Names Board of Canada.

== Climate ==
Based on the Köppen climate classification, Kumkan Peak is located in a subarctic climate zone of western North America. Most weather fronts originate in the Pacific Ocean, and travel east toward the Coast Mountains where they are forced upward by the range (Orographic lift), causing them to drop their moisture in the form of rain or snowfall. As a result, the Coast Mountains experience high precipitation, especially during the winter months in the form of snowfall. Winter temperatures can drop below −20 °C with wind chill factors below −30 °C. This climate supports the Kwoiek Glacier on the north slope of the peak. The months July through September offer the most favorable weather for climbing Kumkan Peak.

== Gallery ==
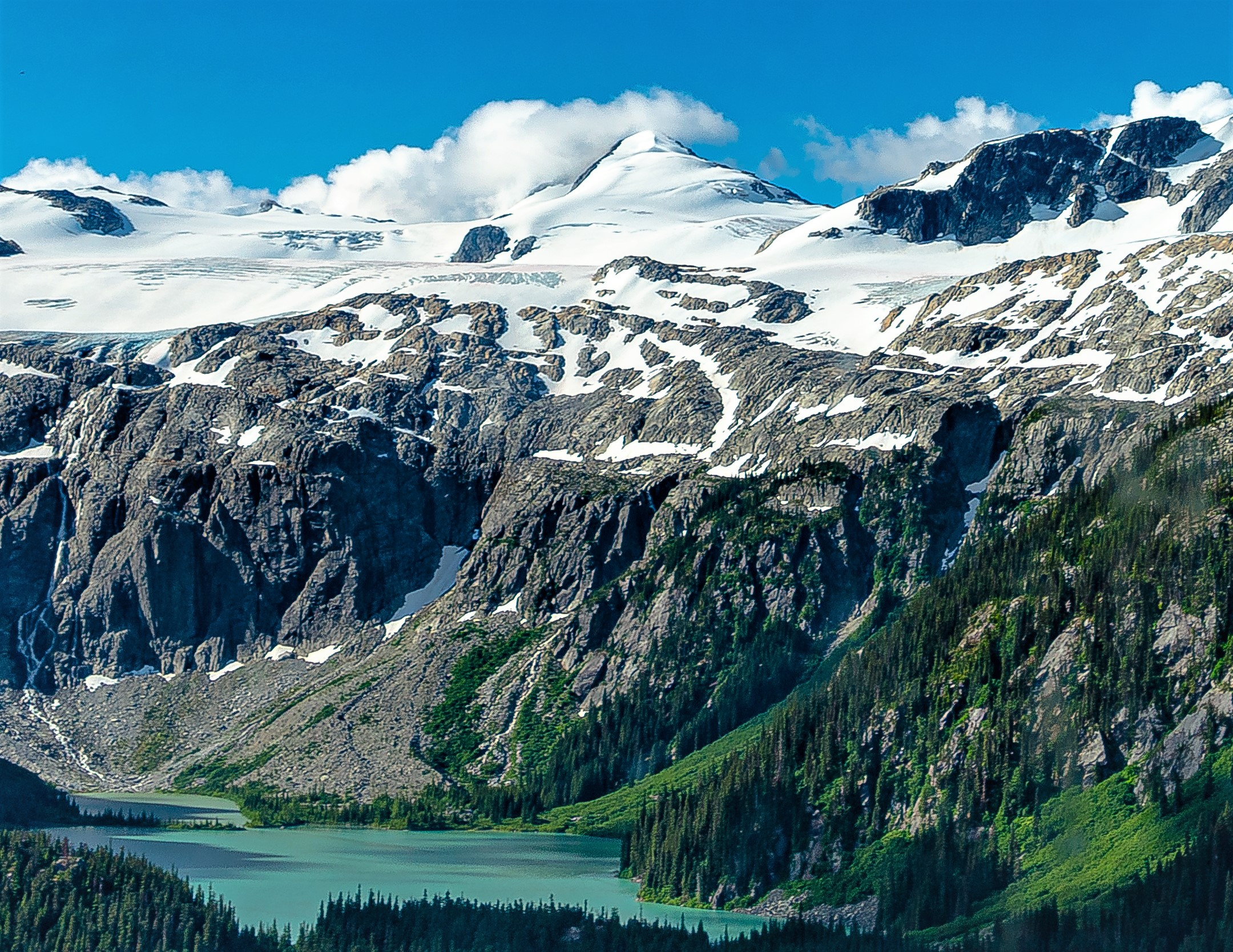
Aerial view of Kumkan Peak, Kwoiek Glacier and Stukolait Lake.

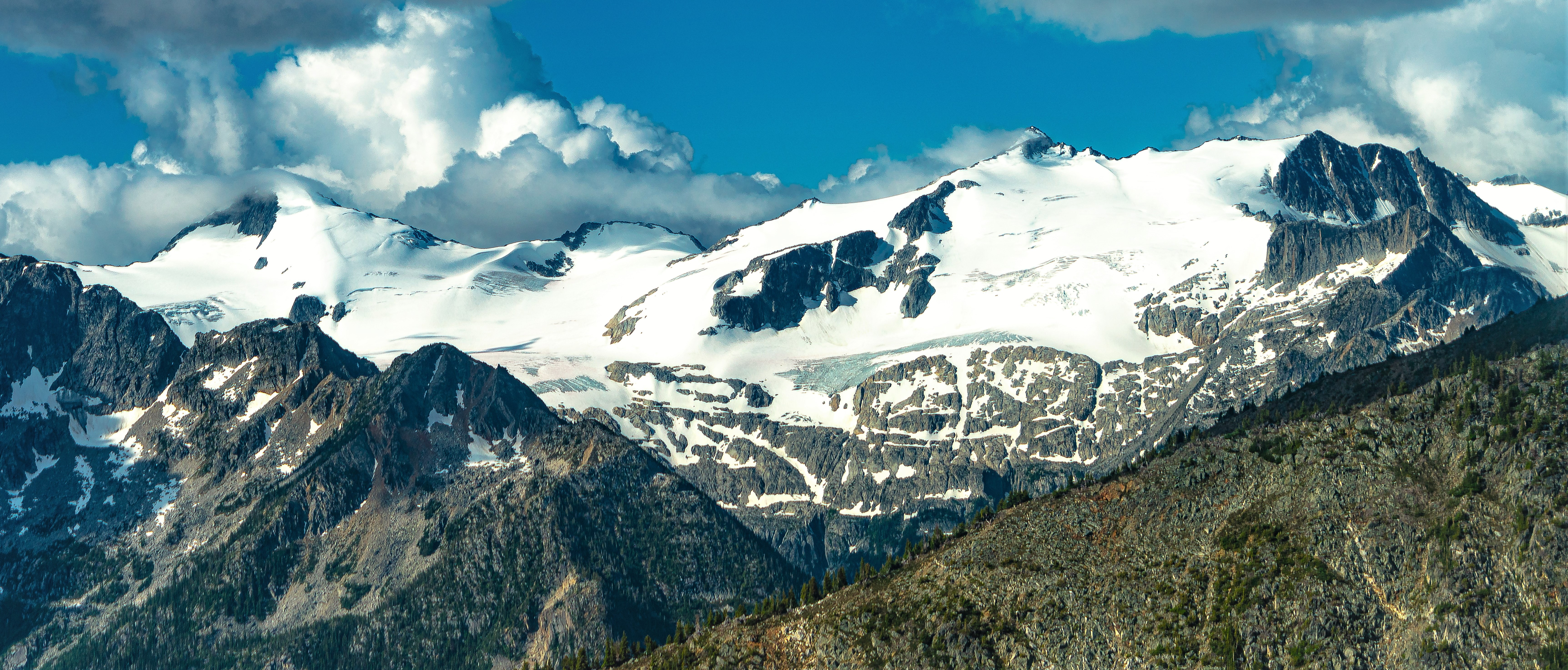
Aerial view of north aspect of Kumkan Peak (left) and Kwoiek Peak (right)

== See also ==
- Geography of British Columbia
- Haynon Peak
