= Cinnamon (disambiguation) =

Cinnamon is a spice regionally made from several different plants.

Cinnamon may also refer to:

== Spices ==
- Cinnamomum, a genus of plants, from some of which cinnamon is produced, including:
  - Cinnamomum verum, Sri Lanka- or Ceylon cinnamon
  - Cinnamomum cassia, Chinese cinnamon
  - Cinnamomum burmannii, Indonesian cinnamon
  - Cinnamomum loureiroi, Saigon- or Vietnamese cinnamon

== Songs ==
- "Cinnamon" (song) by Stone Temple Pilots
- "Cinnamon" by The Long Winters, from the 2003 album When I Pretend to Fall
- "Cinnamon" by Tiffany, from her 2000 album The Color of Silence
- "Cinnamon" by the Wild Strawberries, from the 1994 album Bet You Think I'm Lonely
- "Cinnamon", a 1968 song by Johnny Cymbal recorded under the pseudonym Derek
- "Cinnamon" by Hayley Williams, from her debut album Petals for Armor

== People ==
- Gerry Cinnamon, born Gerard Crosbie (born 1984), Scottish singer-songwriter and acoustic guitarist
- Cinnamon Chaney (born 1969), former association football player for New Zealand

== Fictional characters ==
- Cinnamon (comics), a DC Comics Western character
- Cinnamon Bun, a character in the animated series Adventure Time
- Cinnamon Carter, a character in the Mission: Impossible television series
- CinnaMon, a mascot for Apple Jacks cereal
- Cinnamon, a female professional wrestler from the Gorgeous Ladies of Wrestling
- Cinnamon, the nurse reploid in Mega Man X: Command Mission
- Cinnamon, a character from the Nick Jr. series Blue's Clues
- Cinnamon J. Scudworth, a character from Clone High
- Cinnamon Minaduki, a character in Nekopara

== Places ==
- Cinnamon Bay, a body of water and a beach in the U.S. Virgin Islands
- Cinnamon Butte, a group of volcanoes and lava domes in Oregon
- Cinnamon Mountain, a summit in Colorado
- Cinnamon Peak, a summit in Canada
- La Canela, or Valley of Cinnamon, a legendary location in South America

== Films ==
- Cinnamon (2011 film), an American film
- Cinnamon (2023 film), an American thriller film

== Other uses ==
- Cinnamon (desktop environment), a user interface developed for Unix-like operating systems
- USS Cinnamon, a World War II U.S. Navy ship
- Cinnamon (Swedish band), Swedish indie pop band
- Cinnamon, a picture book by Neil Gaiman

== See also ==
- D'Cinnamons, Indonesian pop band
- Sinnamon (disambiguation)
