= Takakkaw Falls =

Waterfall on the Yoho River in Yoho National Park, British Columbia, Canada

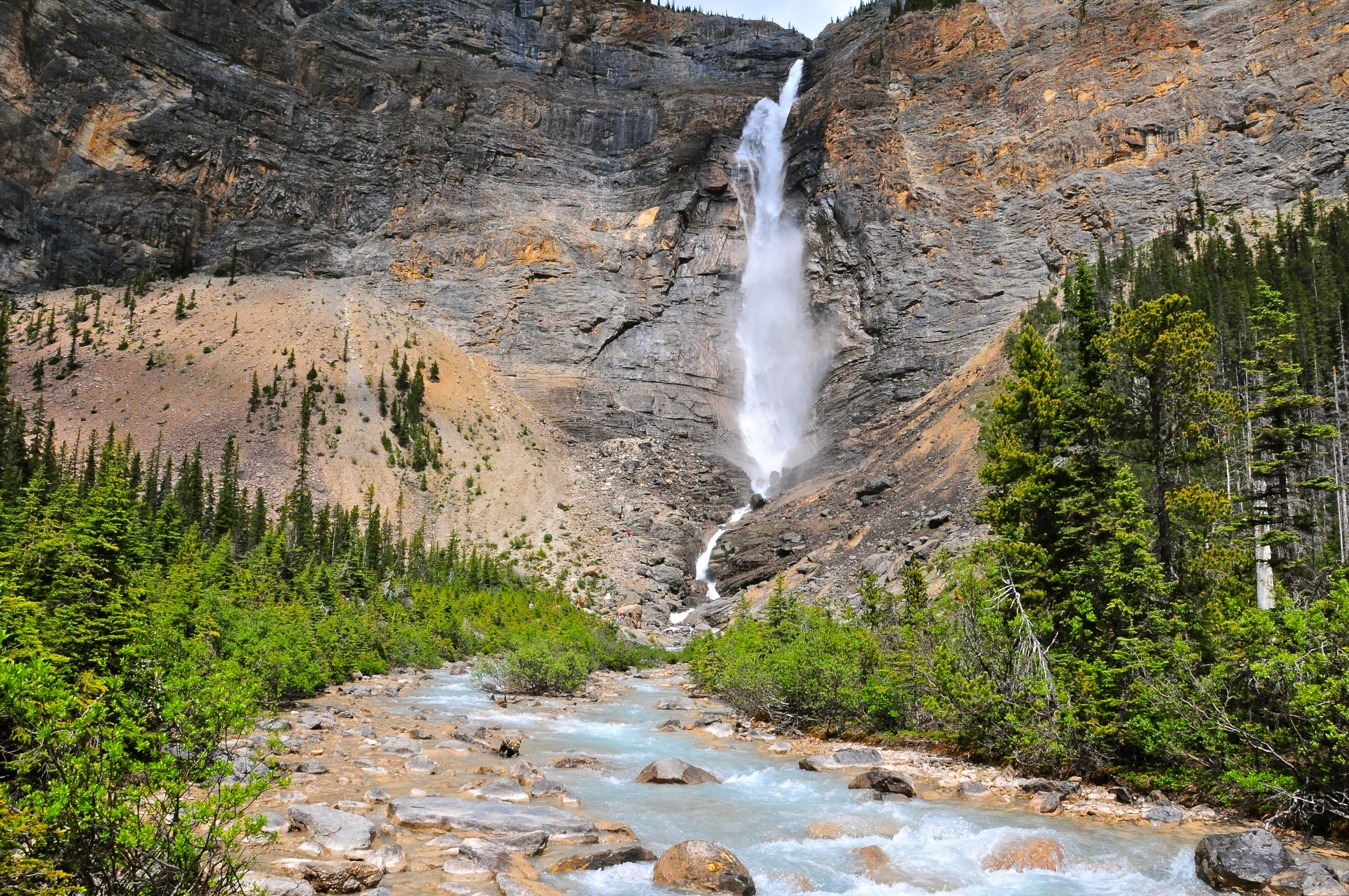
- Takakkaw Falls pictured in 2010
- Interactive map of Takakkaw Falls
- Location: Yoho National Park, British Columbia, Canada
- Coordinates: 51°29′59″N 116°28′22″W
- Type: Tiered Horsetails
- Total height: 302 metres (991 ft)
- Number of drops: 4
- Longest drop: 260 metres (850 ft)
- Total width: 46 metres (151 ft)
- Average width: 23 metres (75 ft)
- Run: 30 metres (98 ft)
- Watercourse: Unnamed
- Average flow rate: 11 m^{3}/s (390 cu ft/s)

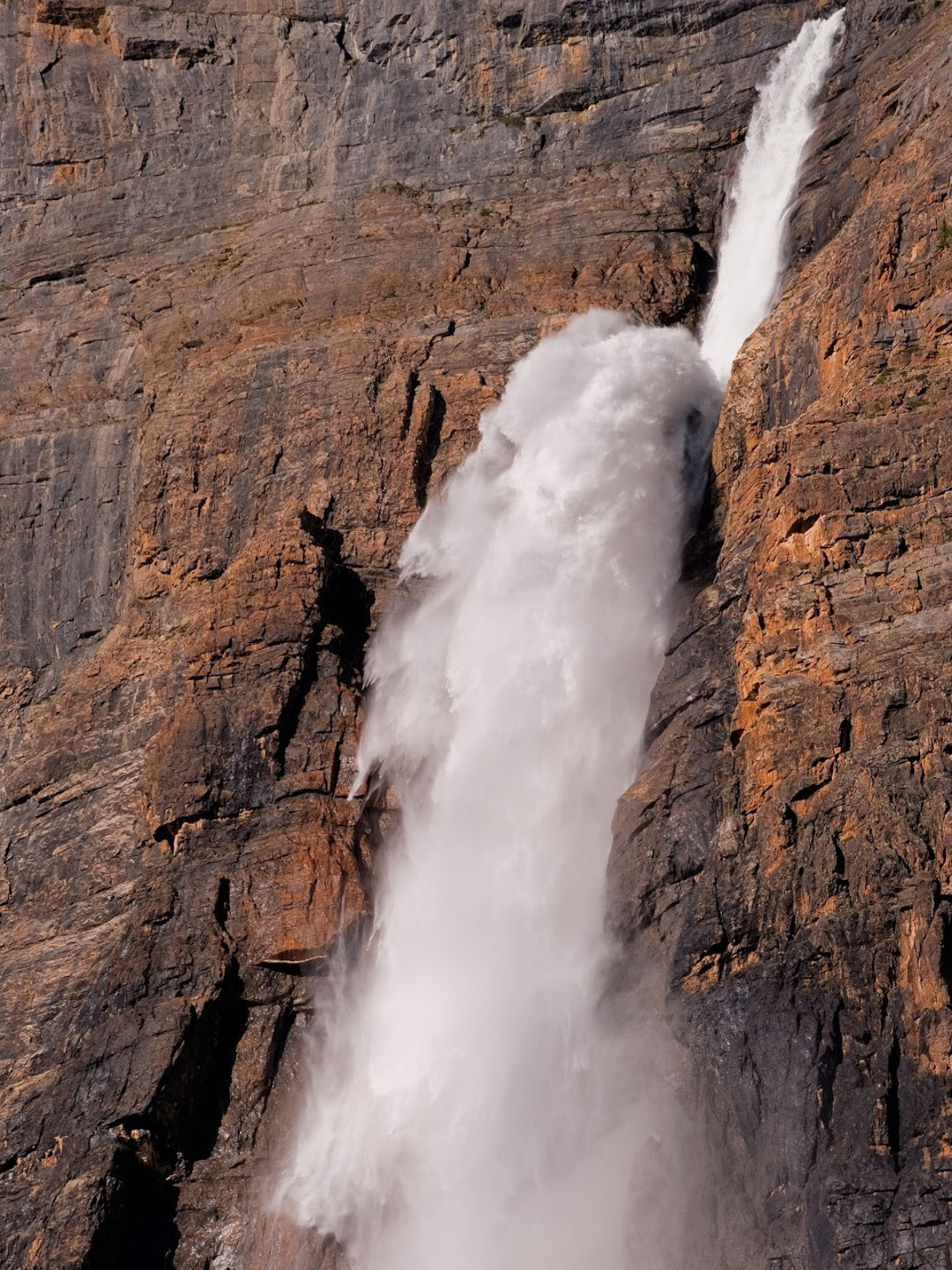
Takakkaw Falls - Detail, in 2012

Takakkaw Falls (/ˈtækəkɔː/; also spelled Takkakaw) is a waterfall in Yoho National Park, near Field, British Columbia, in Canada. The falls have a total height of 373 metres (1,224 ft),. It is frequently mislabeled as the second tallest waterfall in Canada The World Waterfall Database however lists about 55 higher waterfalls in Canada.The main drop of the waterfall has a height of 254 metres (833 ft).

Takakkaw means "it is magnificent” in the Cree language. Despite the name's Cree origin, indigenous people did not give the falls this name, and the Cree people did not historically inhabit this area. Rather, it was suggested as a name by Sir William Cornelius Van Horne, the head of the Canadian Pacific Railway, and officially adopted in 1904.

The falls are fed by the meltwater of the Daly Glacier, which is part of the Waputik Icefield. The glacier keeps the volume of the falls up during the warm summer months, and they are a tourist attraction, particularly in late spring after the heavy snow melts, when the falls are at peak condition.

== Height ==
Various sources place the total vertical height of Takakkaw Falls between 302 m (991 ft) and 373 m (1,224 ft). A survey in 1985 found that the main drop of the falls is 254 metres (833 ft) high.

== Gallery ==
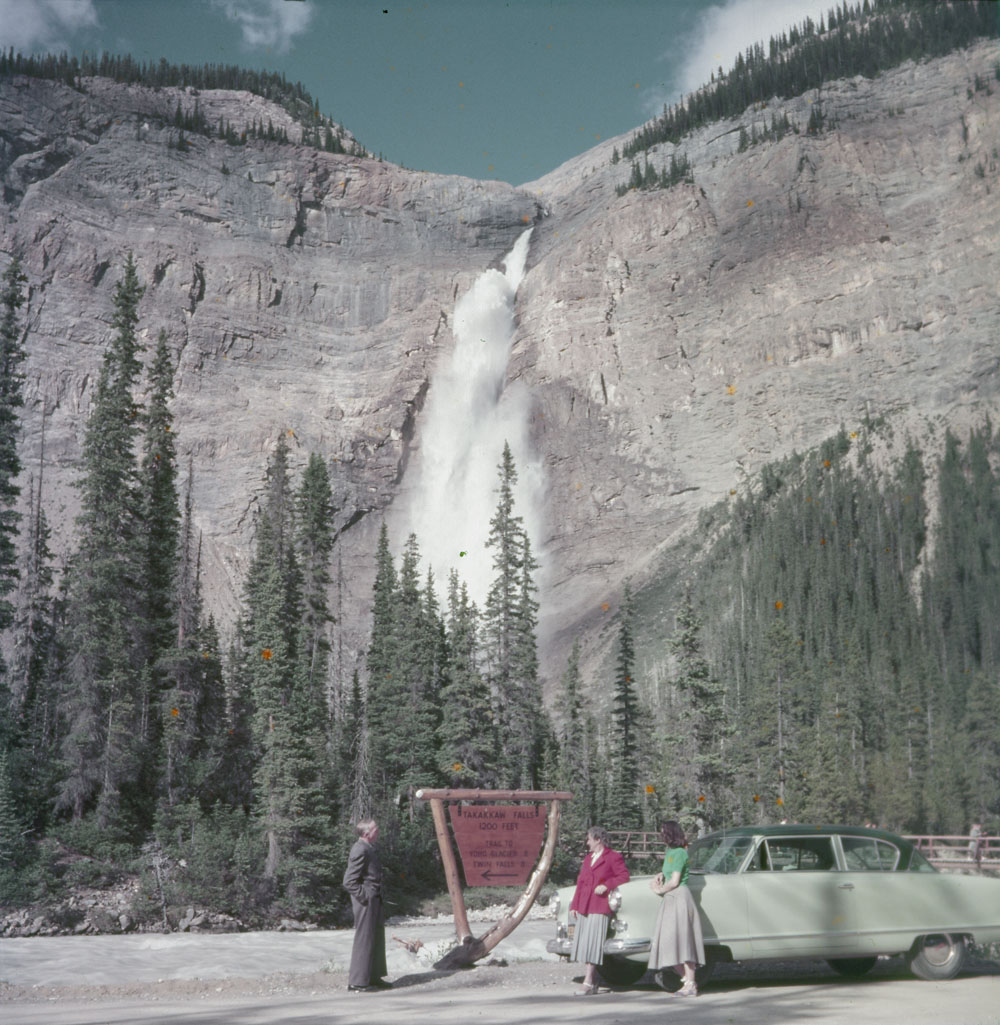
Takakkaw Falls pictured in 1952

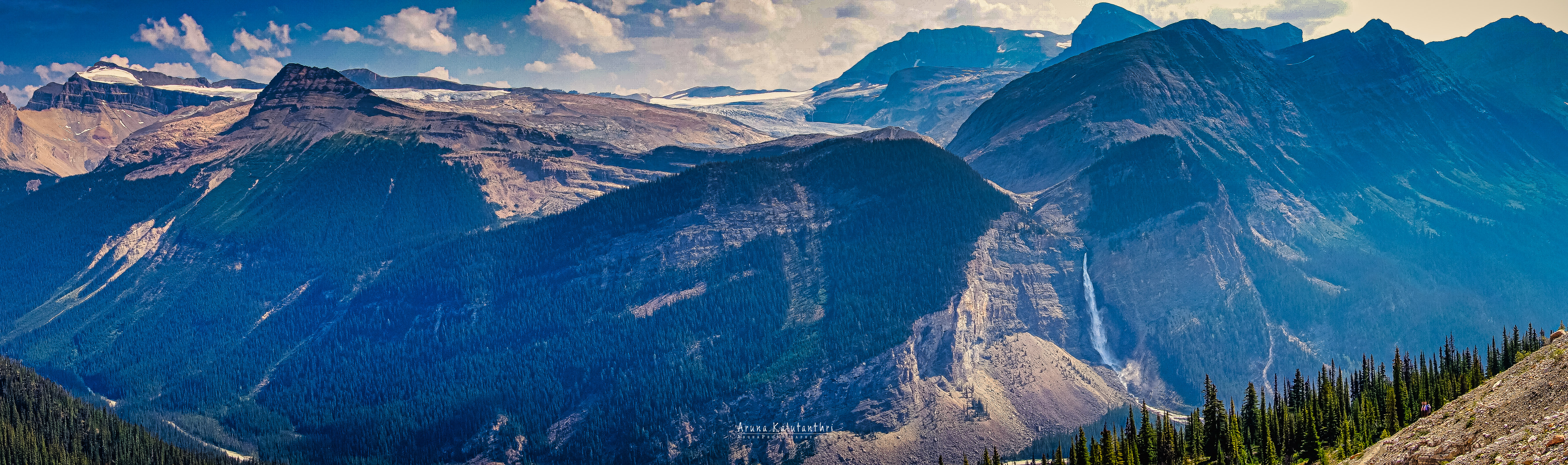
Takakkaw Falls from Iceline Trail

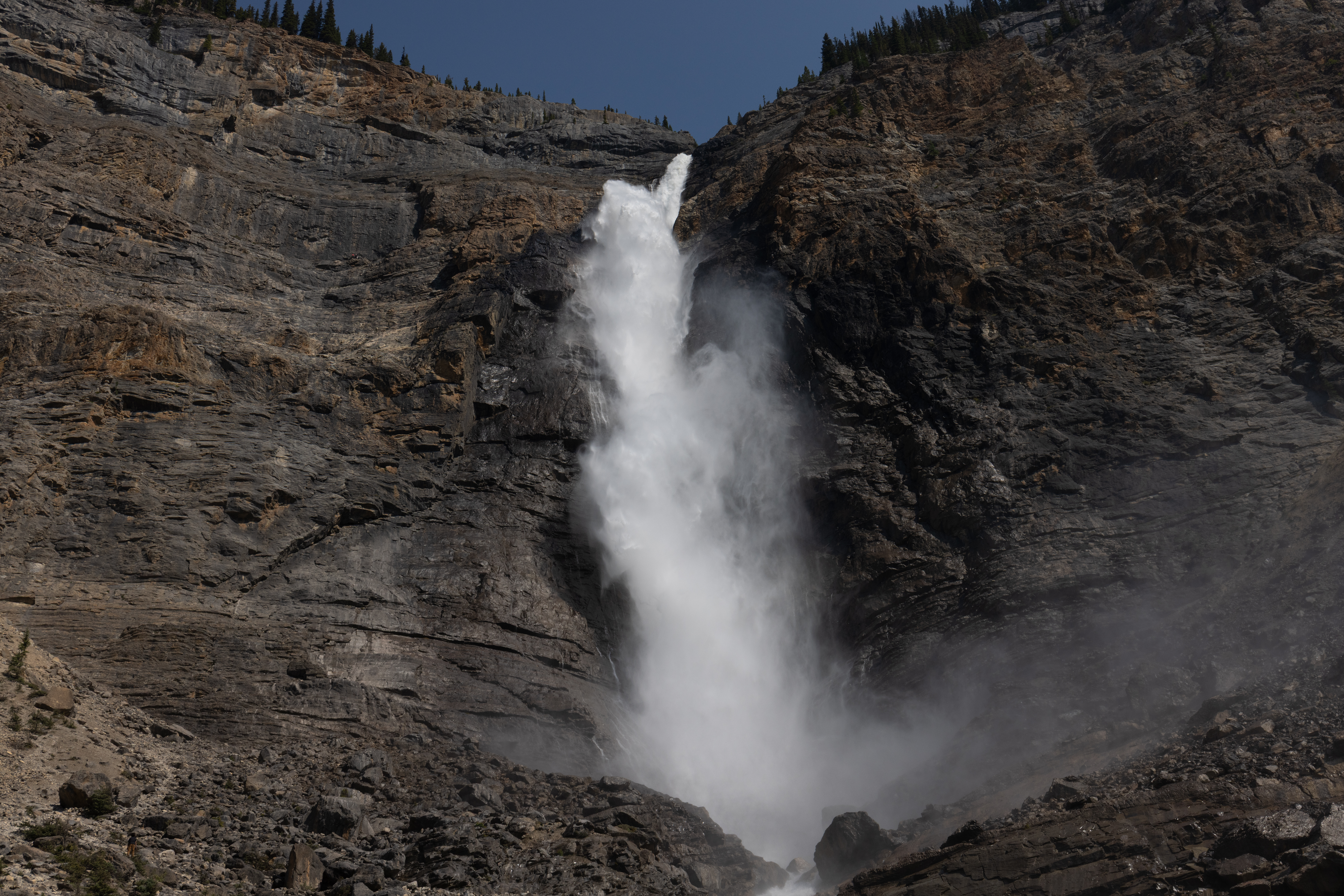
The falls pictured in September 2025

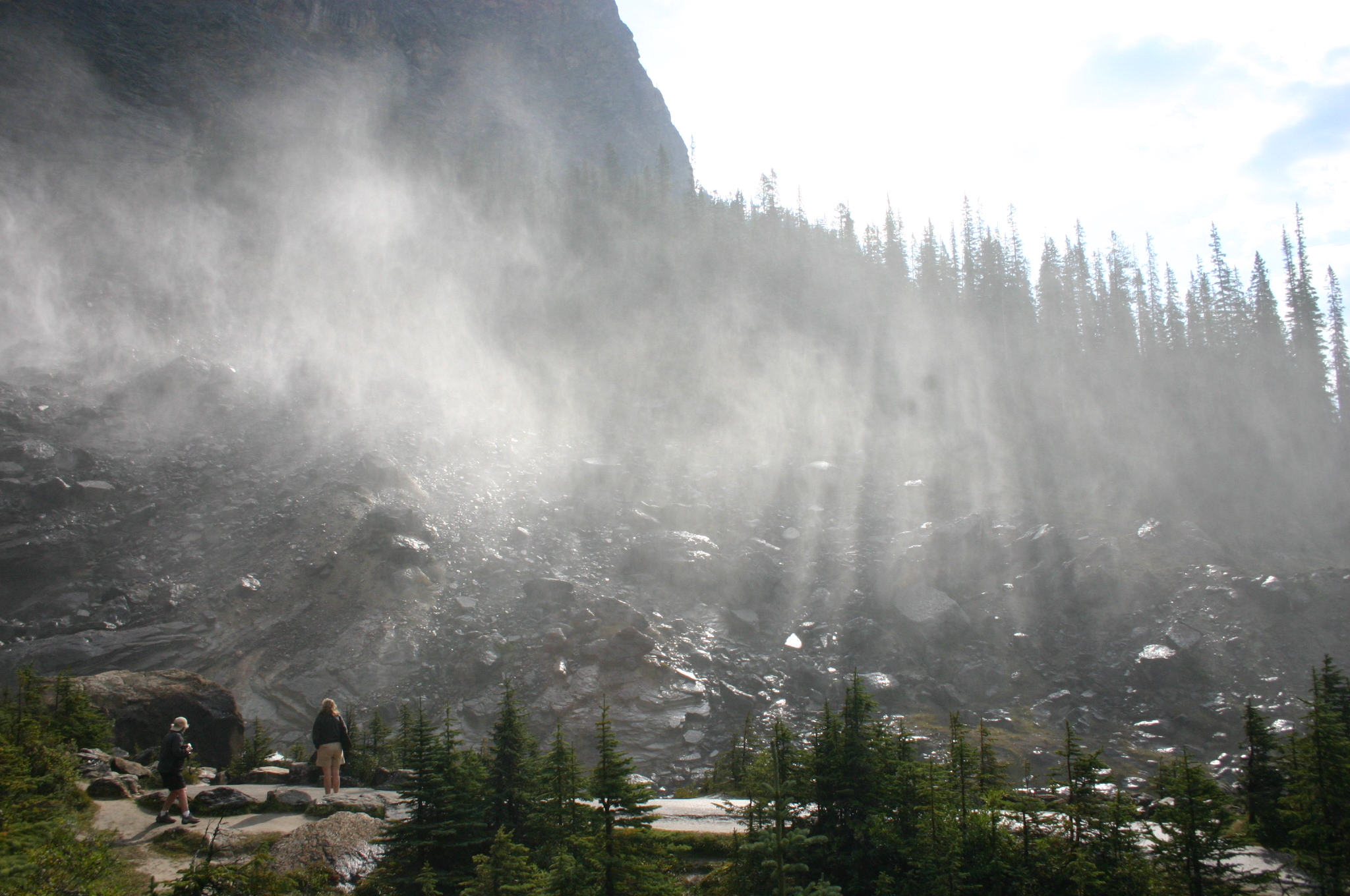
Crepuscular rays through mist from Takakkaw Falls

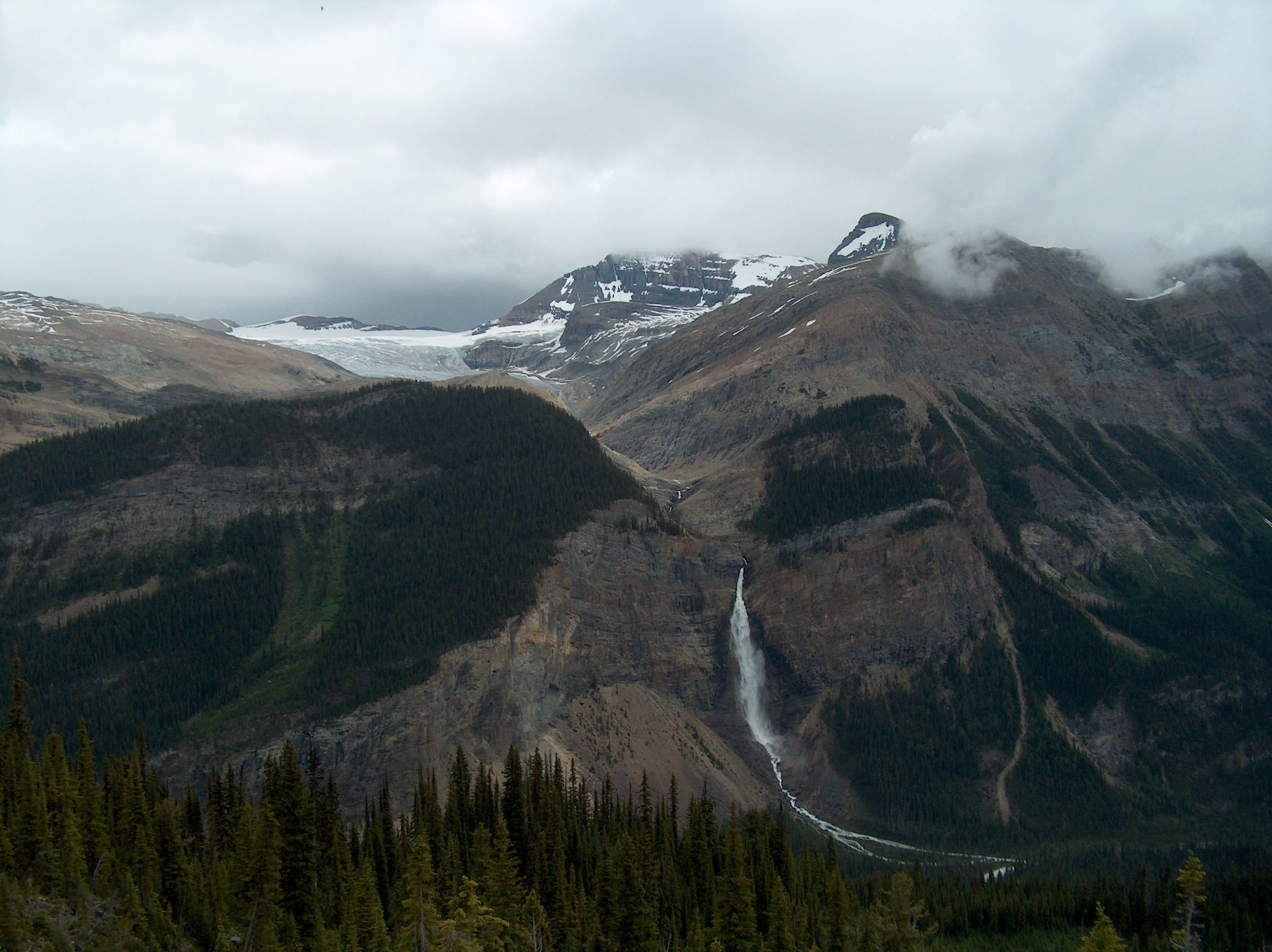
Daly Glacier and Takakkaw Falls from the Iceline Trail, July 16, 2005

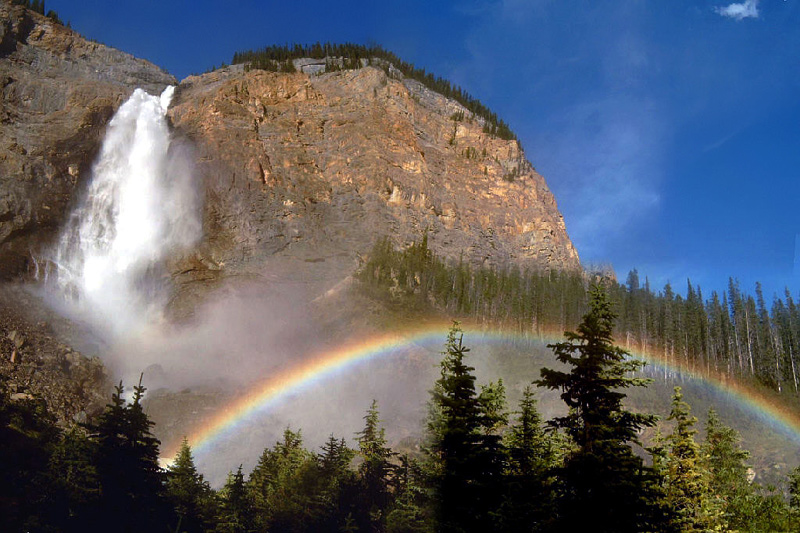
A rainbow over Takakkaw Falls.

== See also ==
- List of waterfalls
- List of waterfalls in British Columbia
- List of waterfalls of Canada
- Yoho National Park
- Wapta Falls
- Della Falls
