= Overlander Mountain =

Mountain in British Columbia, Canada

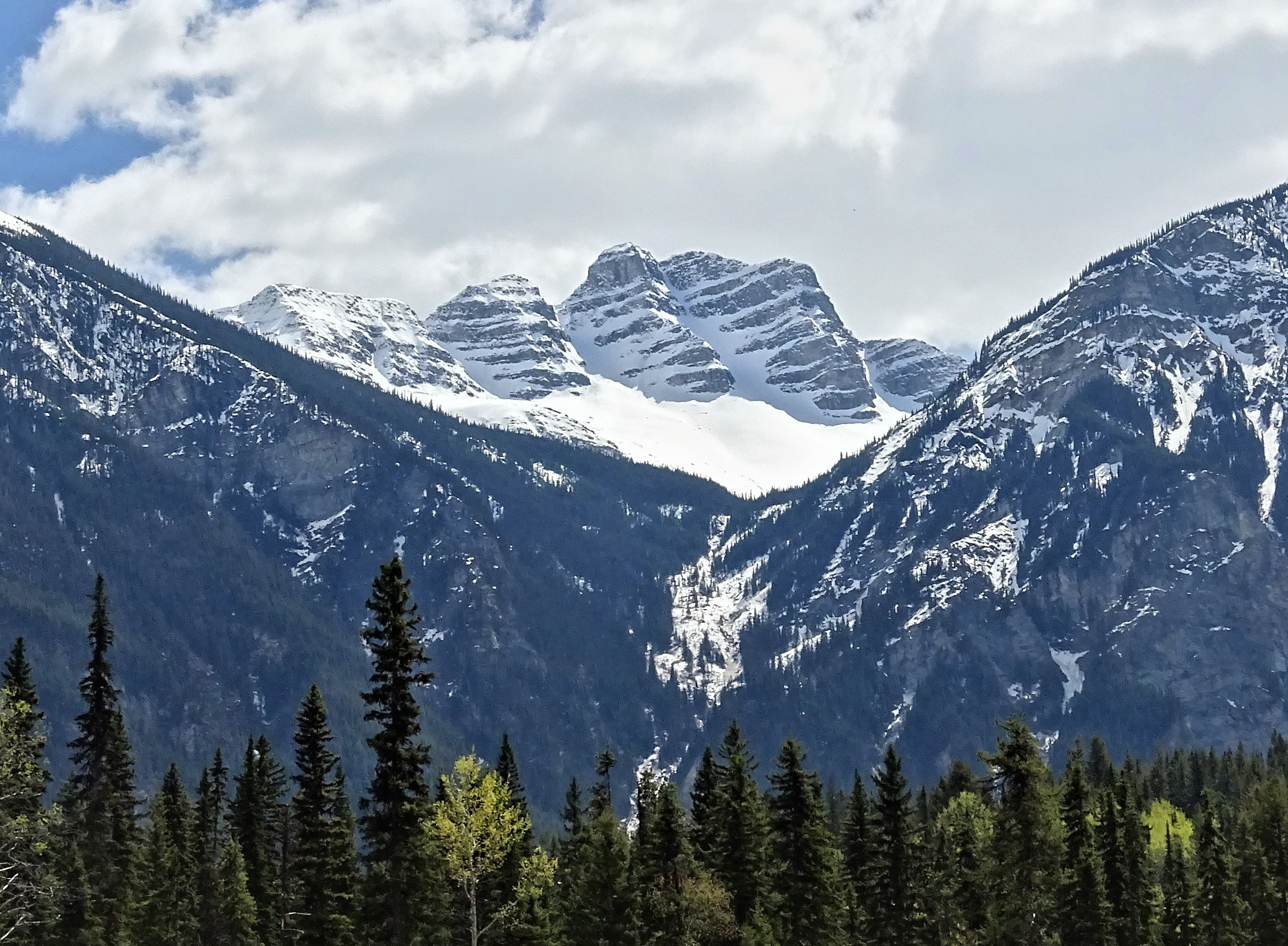
- North aspect

Highest point
- Elevation: 2,687 m (8,816 ft)
- Prominence: 875 m (2,871 ft)
- Parent peak: Siberia Peak (2,804 m)
- Listing: Mountains of British Columbia
- Coordinates: 52°59′29″N 119°11′41″W

Geography
- Location within British Columbia Location within Canada
- Interactive map of Overlander Mountain
- Country: Canada
- Province: British Columbia
- District: Cariboo Land District
- Protected area: Mount Robson Provincial Park
- Parent range: Selwyn Range; Canadian Rockies
- Topo map: NTS 83D14 Valemount

Geology
- Rock type: Sedimentary rock

Overlander Mountain is a summit in British Columbia, Canada.

== Description ==
Overlander Mountain, elevation 2,687-meters (8,816-feet), is located in Mount Robson Provincial Park, just south and within view of the park's visitor centre. It is the sixth-highest peak in the Selwyn Range, which is a subrange of the Canadian Rockies. Precipitation runoff from the peak drains into tributaries of the Fraser River. Topographic relief is significant as the summit rises 1,850 meters (6,070 ft) above the river in 4 km (2.5 mi). The Yellowhead Highway (Highway 16) and Canadian National Railway traverse around the northern base of the mountain. Views from the summit include Robson Valley, Cinnamon Peak, Whitehorn Mountain, Mount Robson, Resplendent Mountain, and many other peaks. The nearest neighbor is Klapperhorn Mountain, 2.0 km (1.2 mi) to the northwest.

== History ==
The mountain's toponym was adopted by British Columbia on March 13, 1972, and officially adopted January 30, 1980, by the Geographical Names Board of Canada. The mountain and nearby Overlander Falls are named for the Overlanders expedition of 1862 which made part of their perilous journey through the valley beneath this peak. "The Overlanders", a group of 175 men and one woman led by Thomas McMicking, travelled from Ontario across the prairies and through the Rocky Mountains, intending to reach the Cariboo goldfields.

== Climate ==
Based on the Köppen climate classification, Overlander Mountain is located in a subarctic climate zone with cold, snowy winters, and mild summers. Winter temperatures can drop below −20 °C with wind chill factors below −30 °C.

== Gallery ==
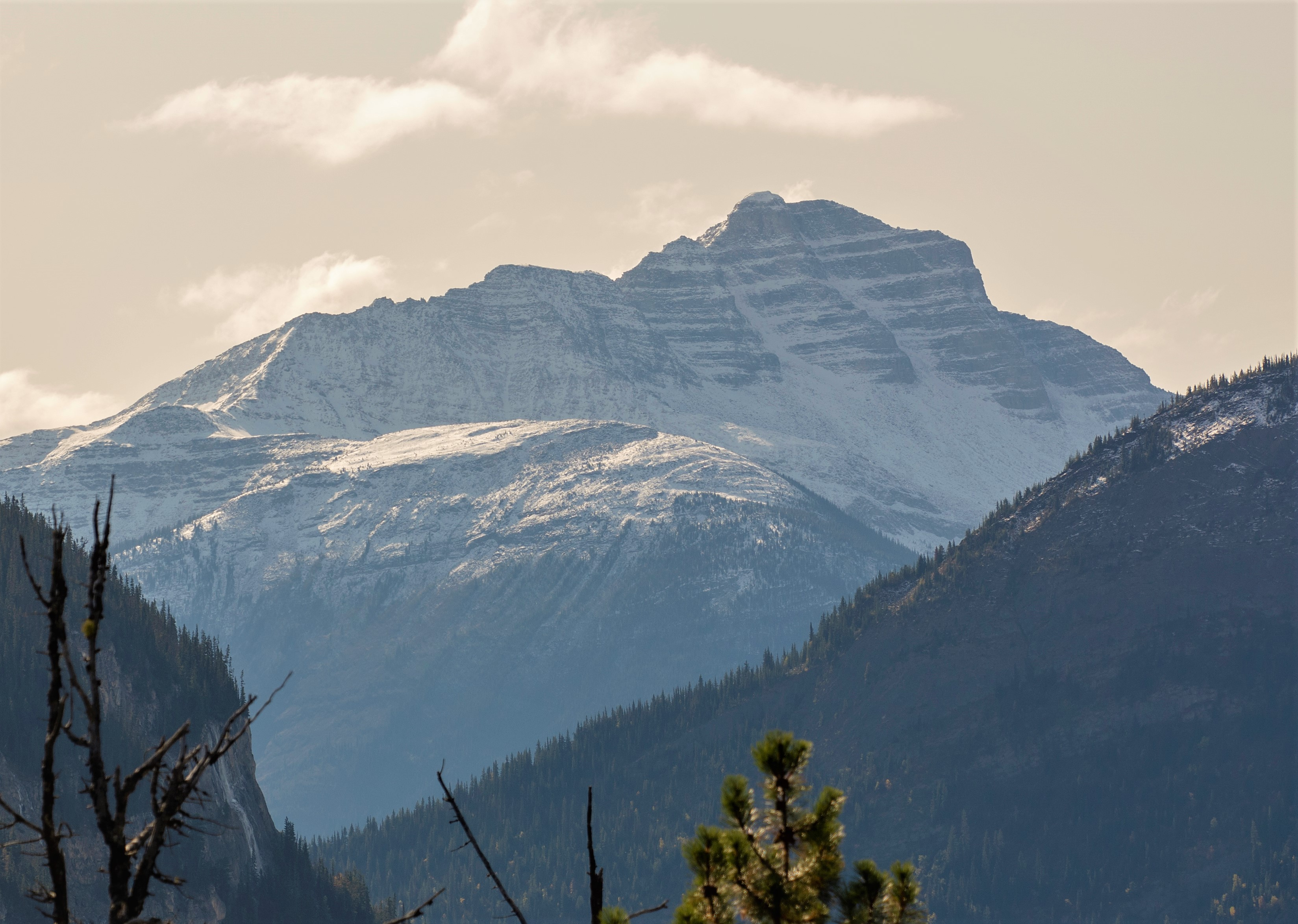
North aspect

== See also ==
- Geography of British Columbia
