= Thompson Falls =

Thompson Falls can refer to:

- Thompson Falls, Montana, a city in Sanders County, Montana, United States
- Nyahururu, a town in Kenya named by British colonists as Thompson Falls
- Thomson's Falls, waterfalls on the Ewaso Ng'iro River in Kenya
- Blaeberry Falls, a waterfall on the Blaeberry River, British Columbia, Canada
