= Basalt (disambiguation) =

Basalt is a common igneous rock.

Basalt may also refer to:

== Places ==
=== Australia ===
- Basalt, Queensland, a locality in the Charters Towers Region, Australia
- Basalt, Victoria, a locality in Shire of Hepburn, Australia
- Basalt River, Queensland, Australia

=== North America ===
- Basalt, Colorado, a city in the US
- Basalt, Idaho, a city in the US
- Basalt, Nevada, a populated place in the US
- Basalt Falls, British Columbia, Canada
- Basalt Headlands, Nova Scotia, Canada

=== Elsewhere ===
- Basalt Island, in Hong Kong
- Basalt Lake, in Antarctica

== Other uses ==
- Basalt, a type of black pottery pioneered by the 18th-century potter Josiah Wedgwood
- Citroën Basalt, a subcompact crossover SUV
- Operation Basalt, the World War II raid
- Operation Basalt, the Syrian civil war 2018 Southern Syria offensive

== See also ==
- Bazalt
