= List of waterfalls in British Columbia =

The following list of waterfalls of British Columbia include all waterfalls of superlative significance.

== Tallest waterfalls ==
=== By overall height ===
As of 2020, there are 36 confirmed waterfalls with an overall height of at least 300 m (980 ft).

Waterfall	Image	Height		Location	Coordinates
Waterfall	Image	m	ft	Location	Coordinates
James Bruce Falls		840	2,760	Princess Louisa Marine Provincial Park	50°13′08″N 123°46′57″W
Madden Falls		579	1,900	Tantalus Provincial Park	49°53′20″N 123°19′01″W
Swiftcurrent Falls		537	1,762	Mount Robson Provincial Park	53°07′49″N 119°19′03″W
Kingcome Valley Falls		520	1,710	Regional District of Mount Waddington	51°16′10″N 126°12′46″W
Francis Falls		518	1,699	qathet Regional District	50°39′33″N 124°11′47″W
Storey Peak Falls		480	1,570	Squamish-Lillooet Regional District	50°00′17″N 123°21′53″W
Cerberus Falls		475	1,558	Columbia-Shuswap Regional District	51°53′39″N 117°04′19″W
Kiwi Falls		475	1,558	Schoen Lake Provincial Park	50°09′18″N 126°12′44″W
Bush Mountain Falls		466	1,529	Columbia-Shuswap Regional District	51°49′22″N 117°08′01″W
Unnamed waterfall		460	1,510	Regional District of Mount Waddington	51°17′56″N 125°44′16″W
Bedard Falls		457	1,499	Squamish-Lillooet Regional District	49°58′53″N 123°20′49″W
Unnamed waterfall		457	1,499	qathet Regional District	50°18′45″N 123°56′09″W
Harmony Falls		444	1,457	qathet Regional District	49°51′23″N 123°59′55″W
Michael Falls		442	1,450	Yoho National Park	51°28′25″N 116°31′07″W
Della Falls		440	1,440	Strathcona Provincial Park	49°27′16″N 125°32′11″W
South Phillips Glacier Falls		427	1,401	Mount Robson Provincial Park	53°07′24″N 119°13′23″W
Bishop Falls		410	1,350	Taku River/T'aḵú Téiú' Conservancy	58°40′31″N 133°27′12″W
Potamoi Falls		399	1,309	Columbia-Shuswap Regional District	51°52′43″N 117°04′12″W
Hugh Neave Falls		396	1,299	Wells Gray Provincial Park	52°31′05″N 120°09′38″W
Qanadalais Falls		396	1,299	Kitlope Heritage Conservancy	53°03′40″N 127°31′24″W
Pétain Falls		375	1,230	Elk Lakes Provincial Park	50°32′20″N 115°08′57″W
Slollicum Creek Falls		366	1,201	Fraser Valley Regional District	49°24′00″N 121°44′27″W
Flood Falls		366	1,201	Fraser Valley Regional District	49°21′18″N 121°31′16″W
Rostrum Falls		366	1,201	Columbia-Shuswap Regional District	51°50′14″N 117°08′19″W
Cinnamon Peak Falls		366	1,201	Mount Robson Provincial Park	53°05′09″N 119°13′13″W
Lyalli Lake Falls		365	1,198	St. Mary's Alpine Provincial Park	49°54′06″N 116°19′57″W
Helmet Falls		352	1,155	Kootenay National Park	51°11′13″N 116°19′23″W
Mallory Glacier Falls		350	1,150	Columbia-Shuswap Regional District	52°18′14″N 117°57′42″W
Illecillewaet Glacier Falls		320	1,050	Glacier National Park	51°14′45″N 117°27′12″W
Angel's Staircase Falls		305	1,001	Yoho National Park	51°31′06″N 116°29′10″W
Blowing Box Falls		305	1,001	Upper Rogers Kólii7 Conservancy	50°05′38″N 122°15′56″W
Miliget Creek Falls		305	1,001	Regional District of Kitimat-Stikine	54°36′34″N 127°51′26″W
Mount Moe Falls		305	1,001	Squamish-Lillooet Regional District	50°11′23″N 122°51′13″W
North Phillips Glacier Falls		305	1,001	Mount Robson Provincial Park	53°08′03″N 119°13′21″W
Takakkaw Falls		302	991	Yoho National Park	51°30′00″N 116°28′23″W
Wedgemount Creek Falls		300	980	Garibaldi Provincial Park	50°09′48″N 122°49′48″W

=== By tallest single drop ===
As of 2020, there are 26 confirmed waterfalls have a single unbroken drop with a height of at least 100 m (330 ft).

Waterfall	Image	Height		Location	Coordinates
Waterfall	Image	m	ft	Location	Coordinates
Cerberus Falls		475	1,558	Columbia-Shuswap Regional District	51°53′39″N 117°04′19″W
Odegaard Falls		271	889	Central Coast Regional District	52°14′29″N 126°17′33″W
Hunlen Falls		260	850	Tweedsmuir South Provincial Park	52°16′36″N 125°46′21″W
Takakkaw Falls		260	850	Yoho National Park	51°30′00″N 116°28′23″W
Hamill Creek Falls		255	837	Purcell Wilderness Conservancy Provincial Park	50°14′24″N 116°35′06″W
Francis Falls		244	801	qathet Regional District	50°39′33″N 124°11′47″W
South Phillips Glacier Falls		244	801	Mount Robson Provincial Park	53°07′24″N 119°13′23″W
Middle Cummins Falls		220	720	Cummins Lakes Provincial Park	52°10′00″N 117°59′25″W
Michael Falls		158	518	Yoho National Park	51°28′25″N 116°31′07″W
Madden Falls		152	499	Tantalus Provincial Park	49°53′20″N 123°19′01″W
Cummins Falls		143	469	Cummins Lakes Provincial Park	52°09′50″N 118°00′30″W
Helmcken Falls		141	463	Wells Gray Provincial Park	51°57′14″N 120°10′40″W
Omega Mountain Falls		137	449	Tantalus Provincial Park	49°46′31″N 123°12′27″W
Shannon Falls		134	440	Shannon Falls Provincial Park	49°40′08″N 123°09′18″W
Harmony Falls		122	400	Sunshine Coast Regional District	49°51′23″N 123°59′55″W
Hermit Falls		122	400	Glacier National Park	51°19′44″N 117°31′06″W
Silvertip Falls		122	400	Wells Gray Provincial Park	51°45′46″N 119°55′09″W
Snag Canyon Falls		122	400	Squamish-Lillooet Regional District	50°10′52″N 123°30′07″W
Twin Falls		122	400	Yoho National Park	51°32′36″N 116°32′19″W
High Falls		115	377	Squamish-Lillooet Regional District	49°56′39″N 123°17′45″W
Pétain Falls		114	374	Elk Lakes Provincial Park	50°32′20″N 115°08′57″W
Naiad Falls		111	364	Columbia-Shuswap Regional District	51°52′52″N 117°04′32″W
Bedard Falls		107	351	Squamish-Lillooet Regional District	49°58′53″N 123°20′49″W
Mystery Falls		101	331	Garibaldi Provincial Park	50°13′01″N 122°50′11″W
Phantom Falls		101	331	Sunshine Coast Regional District	49°50′44″N 123°28′50″W
Potamoi Falls		100	330	Columbia-Shuswap Regional District	51°52′43″N 117°04′12″W

== Waterfalls by average flow rate ==
As of 2020, there are 10 confirmed waterfalls with an average flow rate or discharge of at least 50 m^{3}/s (1,800 cu ft/s).

Waterfall	Image	Discharge		Location	Coordinates
Waterfall	Image	m^{3}/s	ft^{3}/s	Location	Coordinates
Rearguard Falls		171	6,000	Rearguard Falls Provincial Park	52°58′24″N 119°21′51″W
Baileys Chute		122	4,300	Wells Gray Provincial Park	52°04′19″N 120°11′33″W
Marcus Falls		122	4,300	Wells Gray Provincial Park	52°04′28″N 120°12′00″W
Osprey Falls		113	4,000	Wells Gray Provincial Park	52°08′24″N 120°11′36″W
Dawson Falls		107	3,800	Wells Gray Provincial Park	51°57′55″N 120°07′25″W
Helmcken Falls		107	3,800	Wells Gray Provincial Park	51°57′14″N 120°10′40″W
The Mushbowl		107	3,800	Wells Gray Provincial Park	51°57′51″N 120°07′48″W
Wapta Falls		96	3,400	Yoho National Park	51°11′14″N 116°34′31″W
Overlander Falls		79	2,800	Mount Robson Provincial Park	53°01′51″N 119°12′16″W
Nairn Falls		57	2,000	Nairn Falls Provincial Park	50°17′23″N 122°50′02″W

== Other noteworthy waterfalls ==
Waterfall	Image	Height	Width	Type	Coordinates	Ref
Alexander Falls		53 m (174 ft)	20 m (66 ft)	Tiered Plunges	50°08′08″N 123°07′42″W	
Alfred Creek Falls		61 m (200 ft)		Steep Cascade	50°11′55″N 124°07′02″W	
Grizzly Falls	Grizzly Falls – Nahatlatch Provincial Park	276-foot (84 m)		Tiered	49°56′16″N 121°54′22″W	
Ashlu Falls		11 m (36 ft)		Tiered	49°56′02″N 123°21′32″W	
Basalt Falls		3.7 m (12 ft)			52°48′N 125°33′W	
Bergeron Falls		99 m (325 ft)	9 m (30 ft)	Horsetail		
Blaeberry Falls (Thompson Falls)					51°31′N 116°57′W	
Brandywine Falls		70 m (230 ft)		Plunge	50°02′07″N 123°07′07″W	
Bridal Veil Falls		122 m (400 ft)	23 m (75 ft)		49°11′N 121°44′W	
Canim Falls		18 m (59 ft)			51°52′00″N 120°35′35″W	
Cascade Falls		12.2 m (40 ft)		Tiered cascade	57°28′25″N 130°15′48″W	
Cascade Falls					49°01′03″N 118°13′11″W	
Chatterbox Falls		37 m (121 ft)		Fan	50°12′20″N 123°46′14″W	
Cliff Lake Falls		215 m (705 ft)	23 m (75 ft)	Horsetail		
Crooked Falls		198 m (650 ft)	15 m (49 ft)	Tiered		
Englishman River Falls		24 m (79 ft)			49°14′51″N 124°21′7″W	
Gold Creek Falls (Note: Unconfirmed)		610 m (2,000 ft)		Tiered Horsetails	49°47′22″N 121°55′36″W	
Keyhole Falls		23 m (75 ft)		Punchbowl	50°40′34″N 123°28′18″W	
Kinuseo Falls					54°47′02″N 121°11′29″W	
Moresby Falls (Note: Unconfirmed)		420 m (1,380 ft)		Tiered	53°00′44″N 132°06′07″W	
Nymph Falls		15 m (49 ft)	46 m (151 ft)	Cascade	49°40′14″N 125°4′38″W	
Peach Creek Falls		183 m (600 ft)		Tiered		
Place Creek Falls		122 m (400 ft)	24 m (79 ft)	Tiered	50°27′48″N 122°38′12″W	
Pyramid Falls		91 m (299 ft)		Tiered		
Smith River Falls		35 m (115 ft)	10 m (33 ft)	Tiered	59°34′10″N 126°27′36″W	
Snowshoe Creek Falls		240 m (790 ft)		Horsetail		
Spahats Creek Falls		73 m (240 ft)	7.5 m (25 ft)	Plunge	51°44′00″N 120°01′00″W	
Thunder Falls; Rockingham Falls; Rainbow Falls		183 m (600 ft)		Cascade		
Upper Little Qualicum Falls					49°19′00″N 124°33′00″W	
Whispering Falls		152 m (499 ft)	15 m (49 ft)	Tiered		

== See also ==
- List of waterfalls
- List of waterfalls of Canada
