= Blaeberry Falls =

Waterfall in Canada

- Interactive map of Blaeberry Falls
- Location: Near Golden
- Coordinates: 51°31′00″N 116°57′00″W
- Type: Punchbowl
- Total height: 30 feet (9.1 m)
- Number of drops: 1
- Longest drop: 30 feet (9.1 m)
- Watercourse: Blaeberry River

Blaeberry Falls is a waterfall on the lower Blaeberry River in the Columbia Country area of the Canadian Rockies in British Columbia, Canada. It is more usually known locally as Thompson Falls, after the explorer David Thompson. It is located approximately 7 km from the river's confluence with the Columbia River at the locality of Blaeberry, British Columbia, just northwest of the town of Golden.

== See also ==
- List of waterfalls
- List of waterfalls in British Columbia
