= Mount McKirdy =

Mountain in British Columbia, Canada

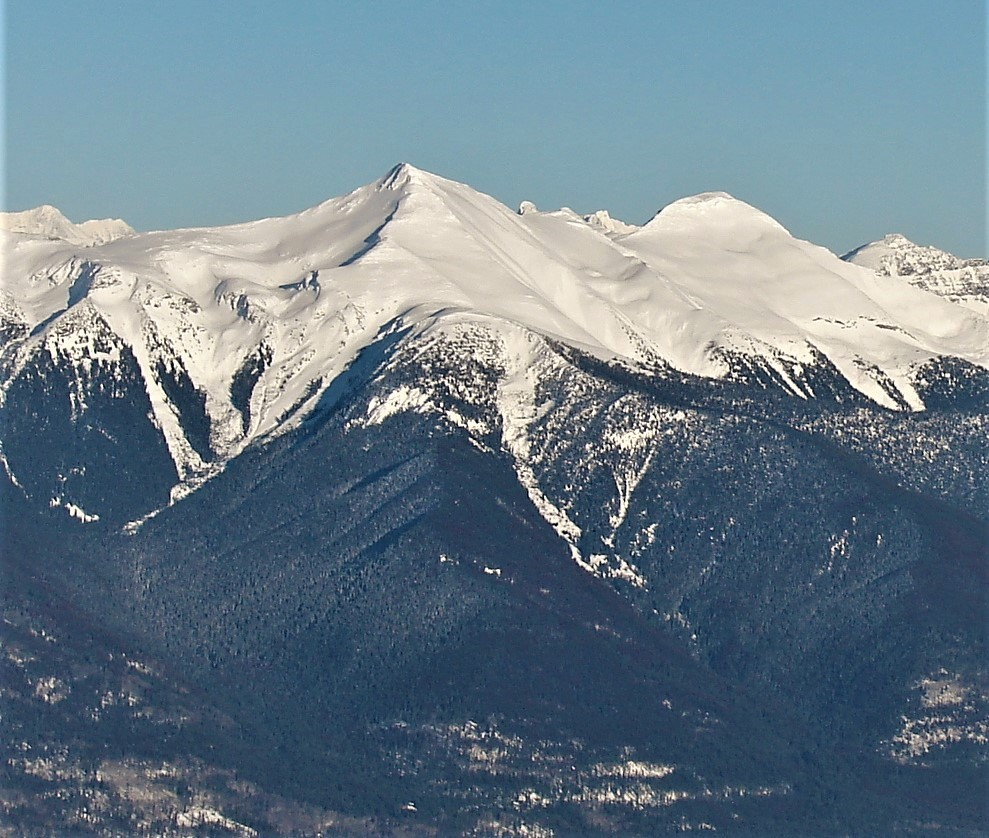
- West aspect

Highest point
- Elevation: 2,586 m (8,484 ft)
- Prominence: 416 m (1,365 ft)
- Parent peak: Paddlesack Peak (2,630 m)
- Listing: Mountains of British Columbia
- Coordinates: 52°50′37″N 119°08′00″W

Naming
- Etymology: Fulton Alexander McKirdy

Geography
- Location within British Columbia Location within Canada
- Interactive map of Mount McKirdy
- Country: Canada
- Province: British Columbia
- District: Cariboo Land District
- Parent range: Selwyn Range; Canadian Rockies
- Topo map: NTS 83D14 Valemount

Mount McKirdy is a mountain summit in British Columbia, Canada.

== Description ==
Mount McKirdy, elevation 2,586 metres (8,484 ft), is located in the Selwyn Range, which is a subrange of the Canadian Rockies. It is situated immediately east of the community of Valemount, along the Rocky Mountain Trench. Precipitation runoff from the north side of the peak drains into Swift Creek → McLennan River → Fraser River, whereas the other slopes drain to tributaries of Canoe River → Kinbasket Lake → Columbia River. Topographic relief is significant as the summit rises approximately 1,800 m (5,900 ft) above the Canoe River in 6 km (3.7 mi). Highway 5 and Canadian National Railway traverse the western base of the mountain. Cranberry Marsh also lies at the western foot of the mountain.

== Etymology ==
The mountain's toponym was officially adopted on September 8, 1975, by the Geographical Names Board of Canada, to honor Fulton Alexander McKirdy (1874–1960), an early settler in the Valemount area who staked the first homestead at the western base of the mountain along McKirdy Creek in 1906.

== Climate ==
Based on the Köppen climate classification, Mount McKirdy is located in a subarctic climate zone with cold, snowy winters, and mild summers. Winter temperatures can drop below −20 °C with wind chill factors below −30 °C.

== Gallery ==
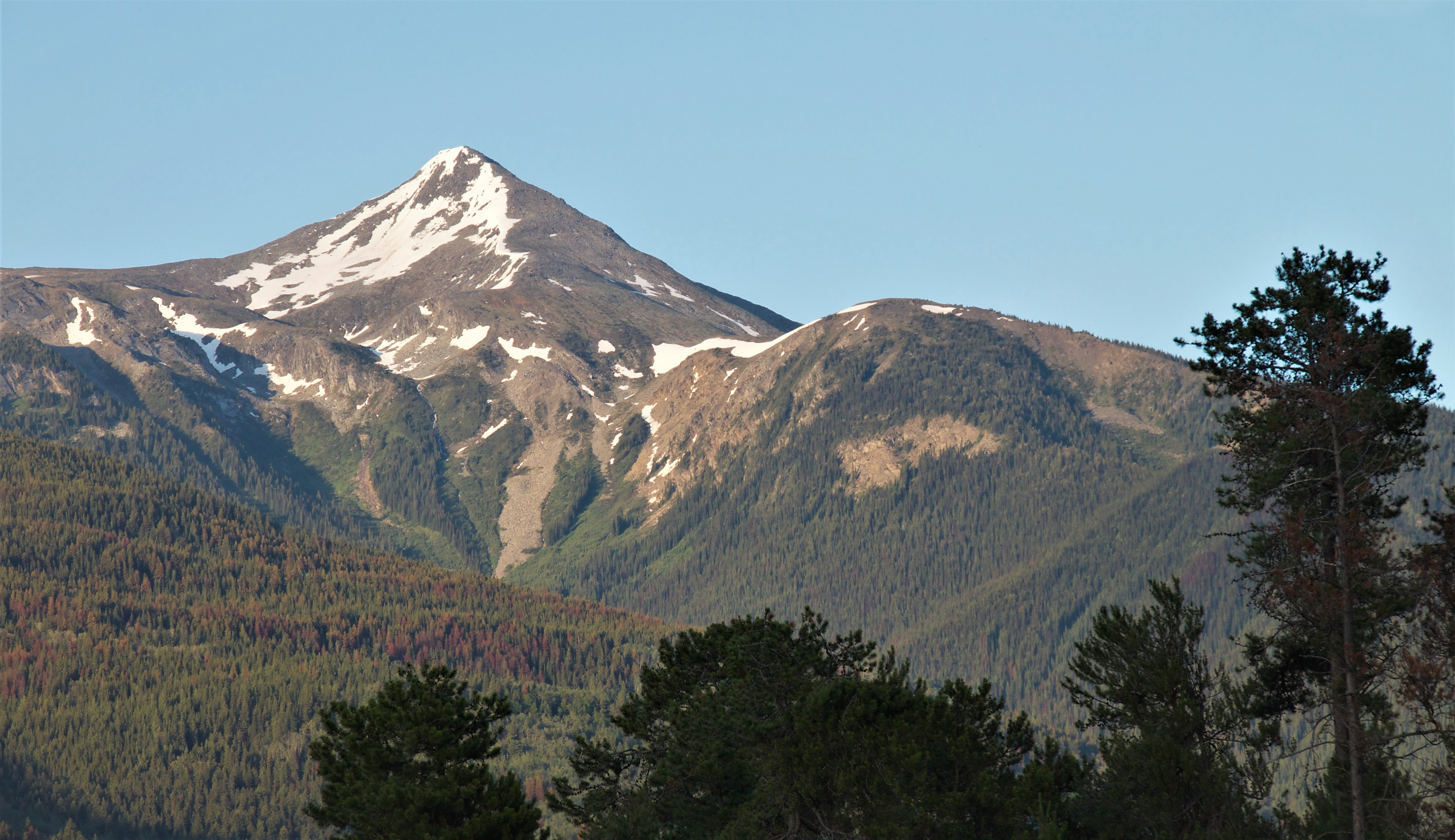
Mount McKirdy from Valemount

== See also ==
- Geography of British Columbia
