= Selwyn Range (British Columbia) =

Mountain range in British Columbia, Canada

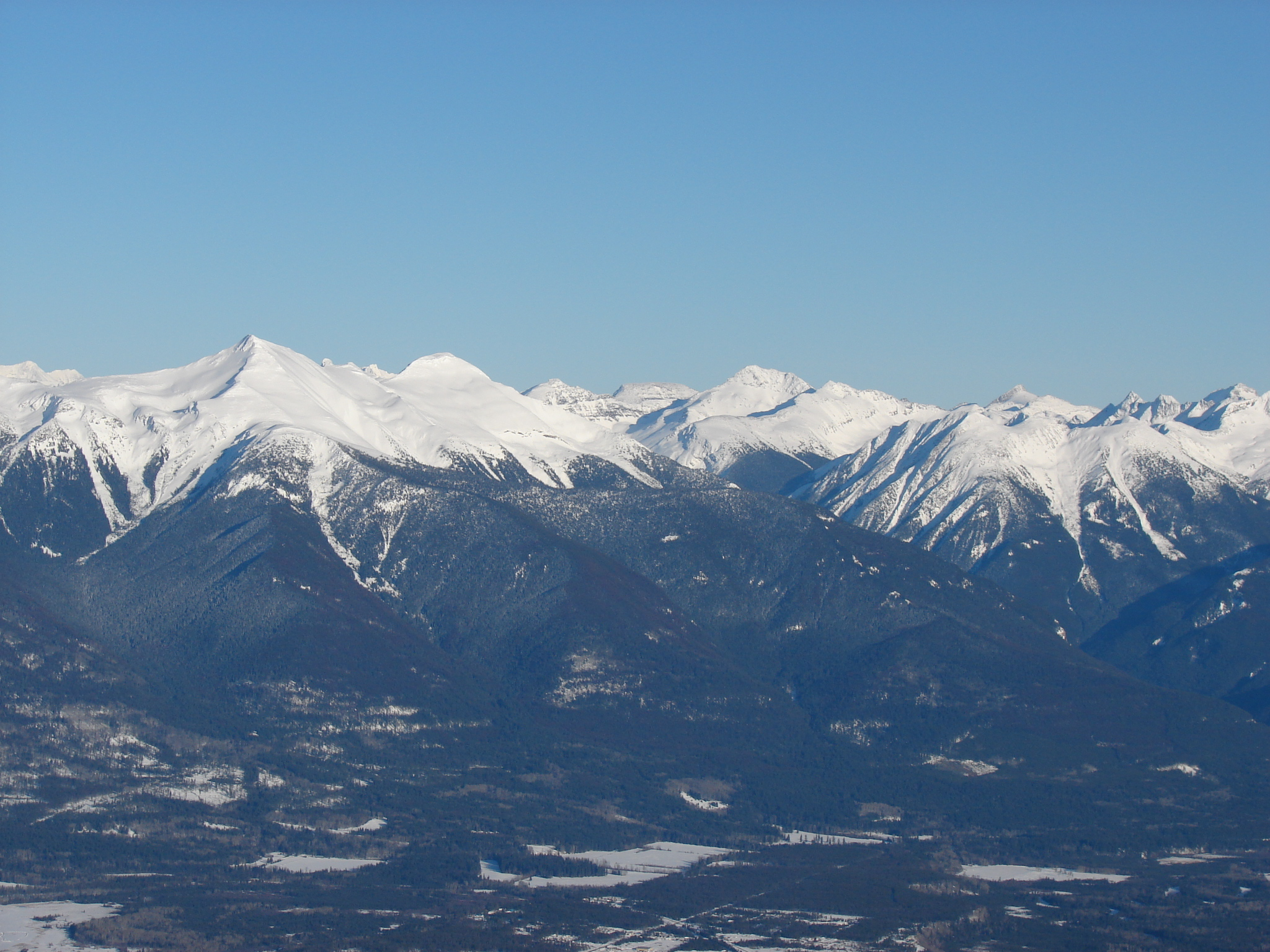
- Selwyn Range, with Mount McKirdy to left

Highest point
- Listing: Ranges of the Canadian Rockies

Dimensions
- Area: 1,318 km^{2} (509 mi^{2})

Geography
- Location within British Columbia
- Country: Canada
- Province: British Columbia
- District: Cariboo
- Range coordinates: 52°54′59″N 119°10′04″W
- Parent range: Park Ranges, Continental Ranges, Canadian Rockies
- Topo map: NTS 83D14 Valemount

The Selwyn Range is a mountain range in the Canadian Rockies in British Columbia. A subrange of the Park Ranges of the Continental Ranges, it is located west of Jasper National Park, east of Valemount and south of Mount Robson Provincial Park.

It was named after Alfred Selwyn, the first director of the Geological Survey of Canada.

The Fraser River originates in this mountain range, near Fraser Pass.

== List of Mountains ==
Rank	Mountain / Peak	Elevation		Prominence		Coordinates
Rank	Mountain / Peak	m	ft	m	ft	Coordinates
1	Overlander Mountain	2,687	8,816	875	2,871	52°59′29″N 119°11′41″W
2	Mount McKirdy	2,586	8,484	416	1,365	52°50′37″N 119°8′0″W
3	Klapperhorn Mountain	2,301	7,549	124	407	53°0′5″N 119°13′6″W
