= Twin Falls (British Columbia) =

Waterfall in British Columbia

Coordinates: 51.5435°N 116.5380°W

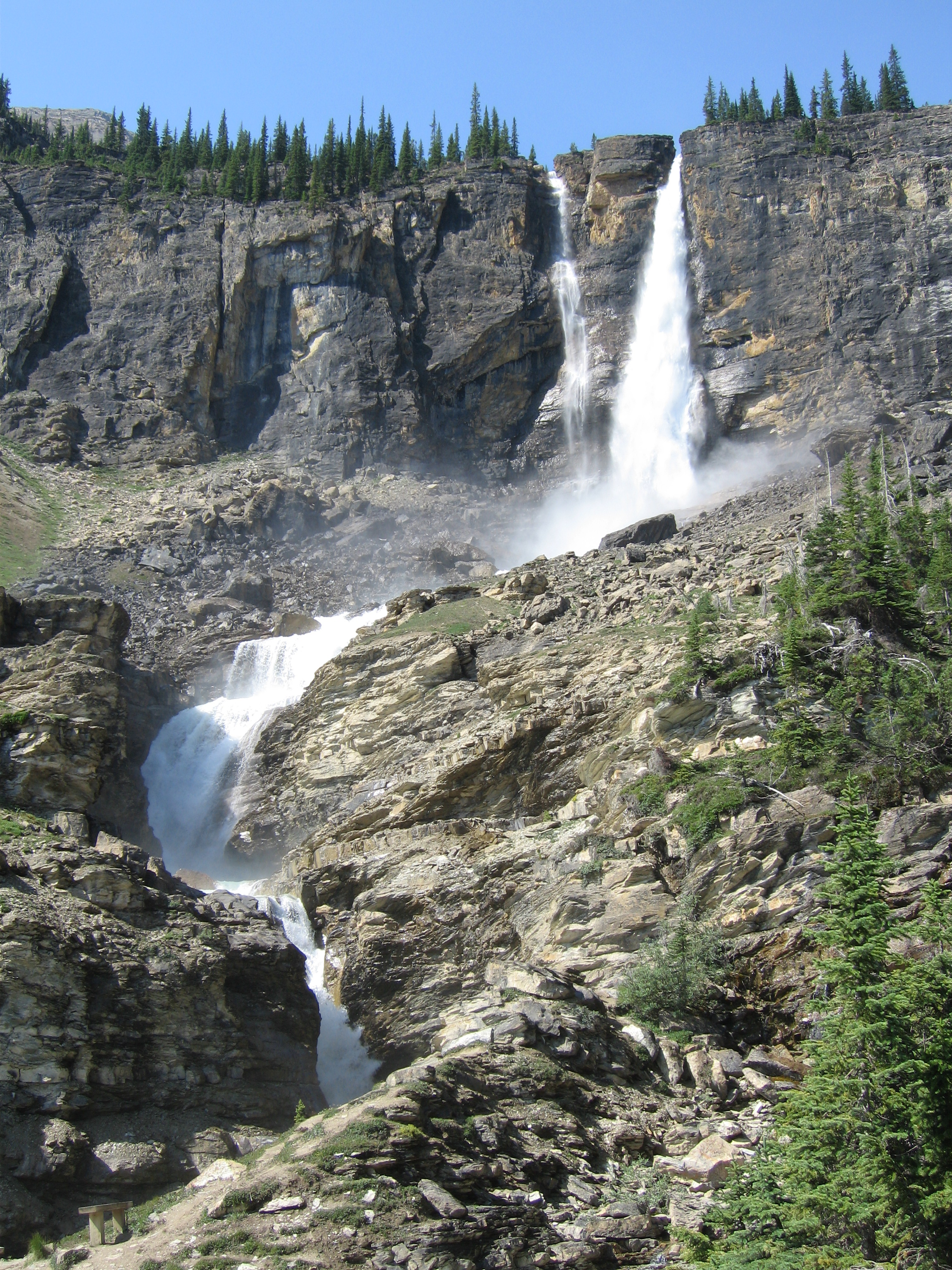
The Twin Falls

Twin Falls is a waterfall in British Columbia, Canada. It is 590 feet high. It is found in Yoho National Park.

== See also ==
- List of waterfalls
- List of waterfalls in British Columbia
