= Angel's Staircase Falls =

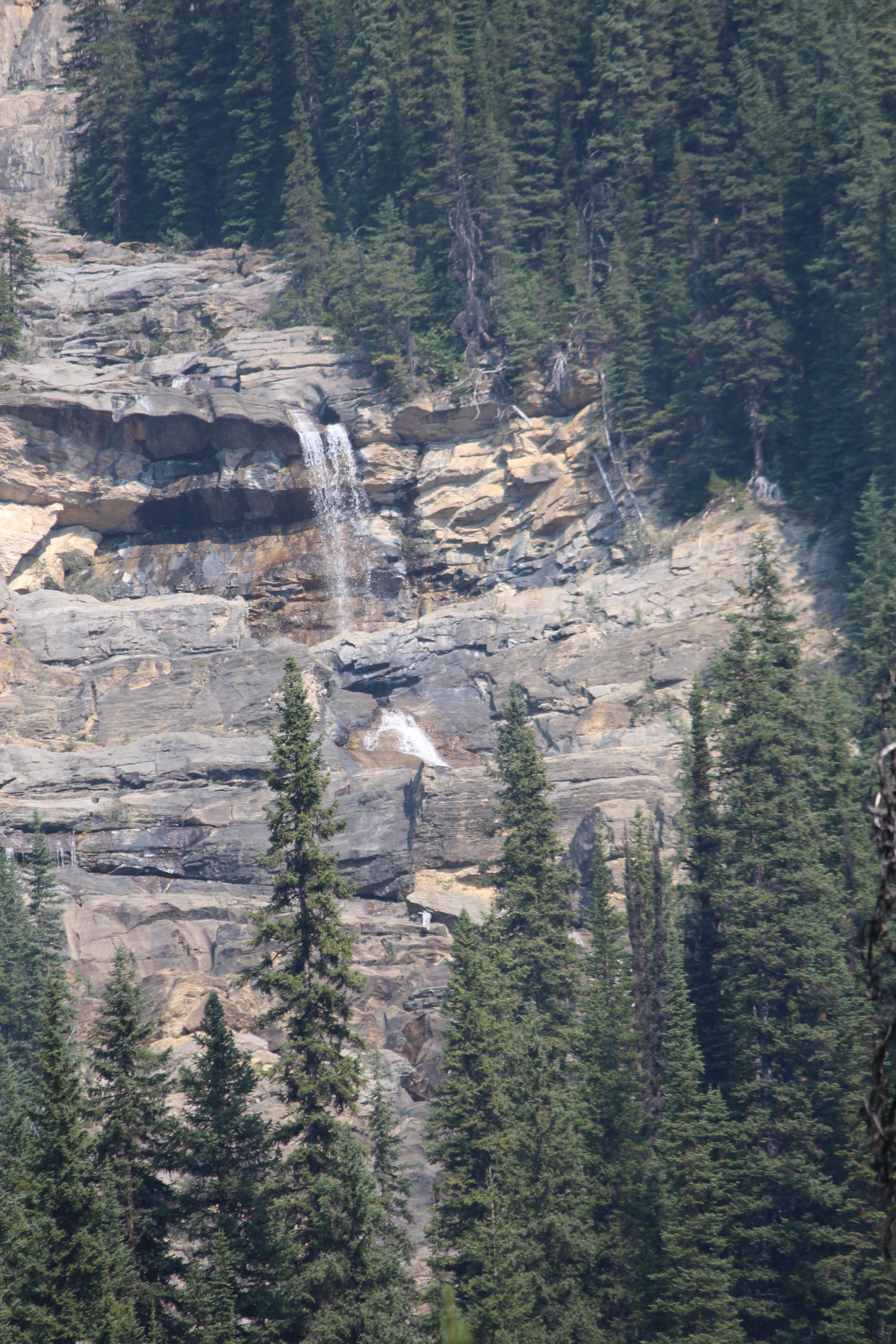
- Interactive map of Angel's Staircase Falls
- Location: Yoho National Park
- Coordinates: 51°31′00″N 116°30′00″W
- Type: Tiered
- Total height: 1,000 feet (300 m)
- Total width: 20 feet (6.1 m)
- Watercourse: An unnamed tributary of the Yoho River

Angel's Staircase Falls is a tall cascade on an unnamed tributary of the Yoho River in British Columbia's Yoho National Park. It drops approximately 1000 feet down to its confluence with the river. A short spur off the Yoho Valley Trail leads to a viewpoint of the views situated at the banks of the Yoho River. The view is distant, and the entire falls can not be seen because of the twisting nature of the falls themselves.

== See also ==
- List of waterfalls
- List of waterfalls in British Columbia
