= Sinnamon (disambiguation) =

Sinnamon was an American female R&B vocal trio from 1982 to 1994.

Sinnamon may also refer to:

== Places ==
- Sinnamon Park, Queensland, suburb of Brisbane, Queensland, Australia
  - Sinnamon Farm, heritage-listed farm in Sinnamon Park

== People ==
- Ryan Sinnamon (born 1996), Scottish football (soccer) player
- Shandi Sinnamon (born 1952), American singer and songwriter

== See also ==
- Cinnamon (disambiguation)
