= Rearguard Falls Provincial Park =

Provincial park in Fraser-Fort George Regional District, British Columbia, Canada

- IUCN category III (natural monument or feature)
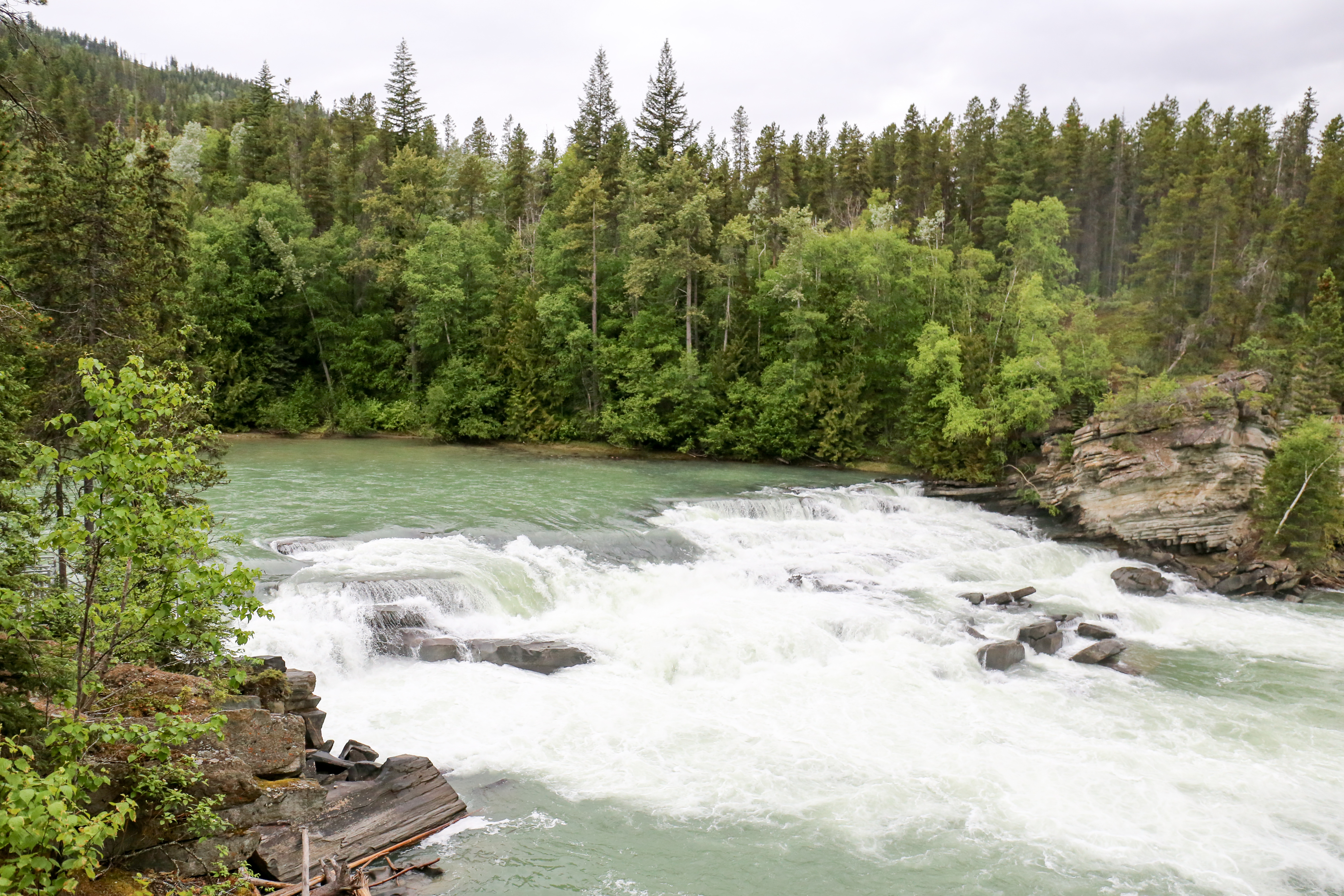

- Location within British Columbia
- Interactive map of Rearguard Falls Provincial Park
- Nearest city: Valemount
- Coordinates: 52°58′25″N 119°21′25″W
- Governing body: BC Parks
- Website: bcparks.ca/rearguard-falls-park/

Rearguard Falls Provincial Park is a provincial park in British Columbia, Canada, protecting Rearguard Falls on the Fraser River. It is located just above its emergence into the Rocky Mountain Trench near the community of Tete Jaune Cache. The park is easily accessed via BC Highway 16. Rearguard Falls is one of only two waterfalls on the 1,375 km-long (854 mi) Fraser River; the other is a few kilometres upstream at Overlander Falls. Rearguard Falls offers a view of the return of Chinook salmon for spawning.
