= Klapperhorn Mountain =

Mountain in British Columbia, Canada

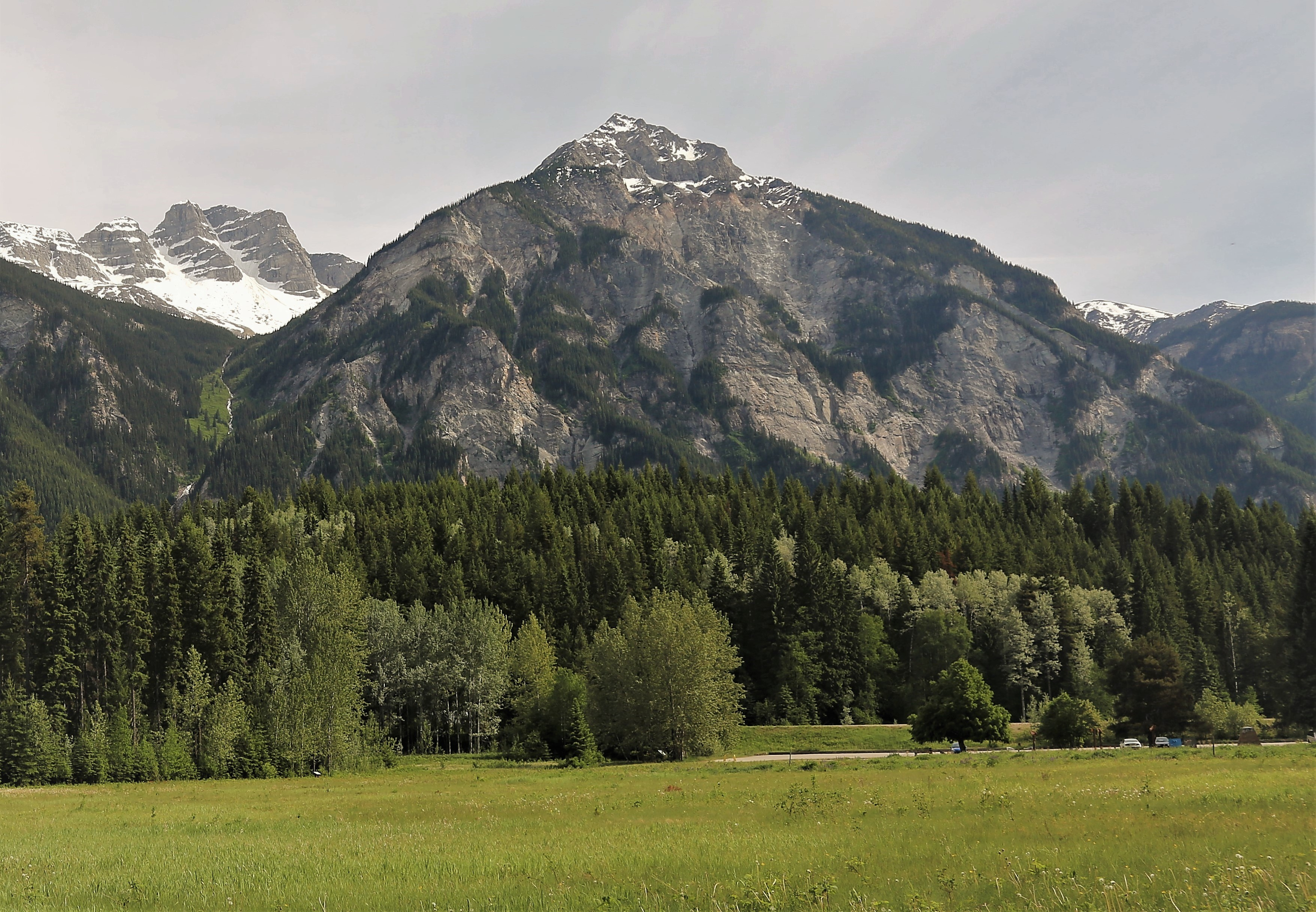
- North aspect, centered

Highest point
- Elevation: 2,301 m (7,549 ft)
- Prominence: 124 m (407 ft)
- Parent peak: Overlander Mountain (2,687 m)
- Listing: Mountains of British Columbia
- Coordinates: 53°00′05″N 119°13′06″W

Geography
- Location within British Columbia Location within Canada
- Interactive map of Klapperhorn Mountain
- Country: Canada
- Province: British Columbia
- District: Cariboo Land District
- Protected area: Mount Robson Provincial Park
- Parent range: Selwyn Range; Canadian Rockies
- Topo map: NTS 83E3 Mount Robson

Klapperhorn Mountain is a summit in British Columbia, Canada.

== Description ==
Klapperhorn Mountain, elevation 2,301-meters (7,549-feet), is located in Mount Robson Provincial Park, just south and within view of the park's visitor centre. It is the northernmost peak of the Selwyn Range, which is a subrange of the Canadian Rockies. Precipitation runoff from the peak drains north into the Fraser River. Topographic relief is significant as the summit rises 1,400 meters (4,600 ft) above the Robson Valley in 2 km (1.2 mi). The Yellowhead Highway (Highway 16) and Canadian National Railway traverse the northern base of the mountain. The nearest neighbor is line parent Overlander Mountain, 2.0 km (1.2 mi) to the southeast.

== Etymology ==
The mountain was named by BC Parks on March 13, 1972, and the toponym was officially adopted December 19, 1978, by the Geographical Names Board of Canada. The mountain is a classic horn-shaped summit, which is notable for the frequency of its rockslides which are audible to campers and are a source of much curiosity and interest.

== Climate ==
Based on the Köppen climate classification, Klapperhorn Mountain is located in a subarctic climate zone with cold, snowy winters, and mild summers. Winter temperatures can drop below −20 °C with wind chill factors below −30 °C.

== Gallery ==
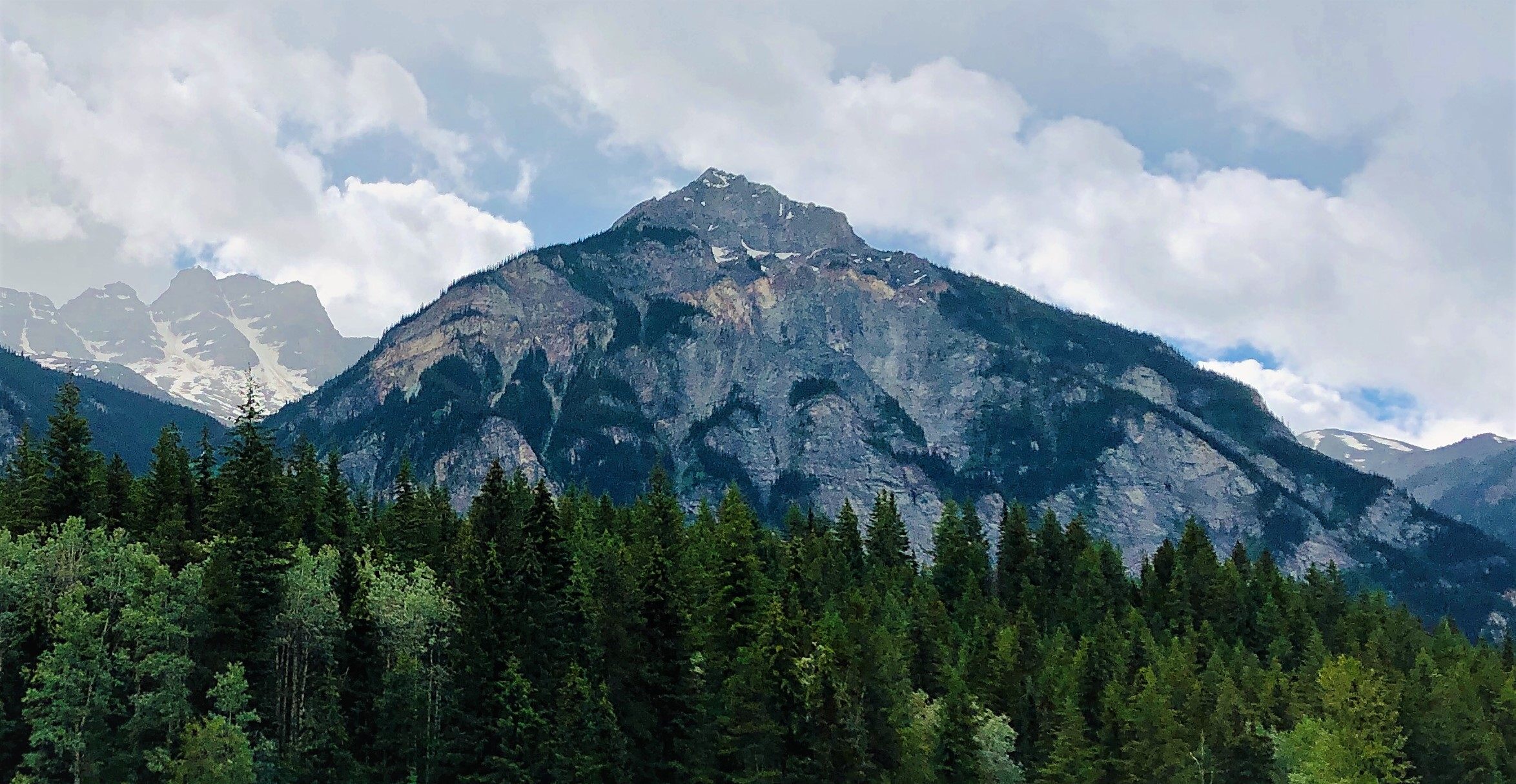
Klapperhorn Mountain from north

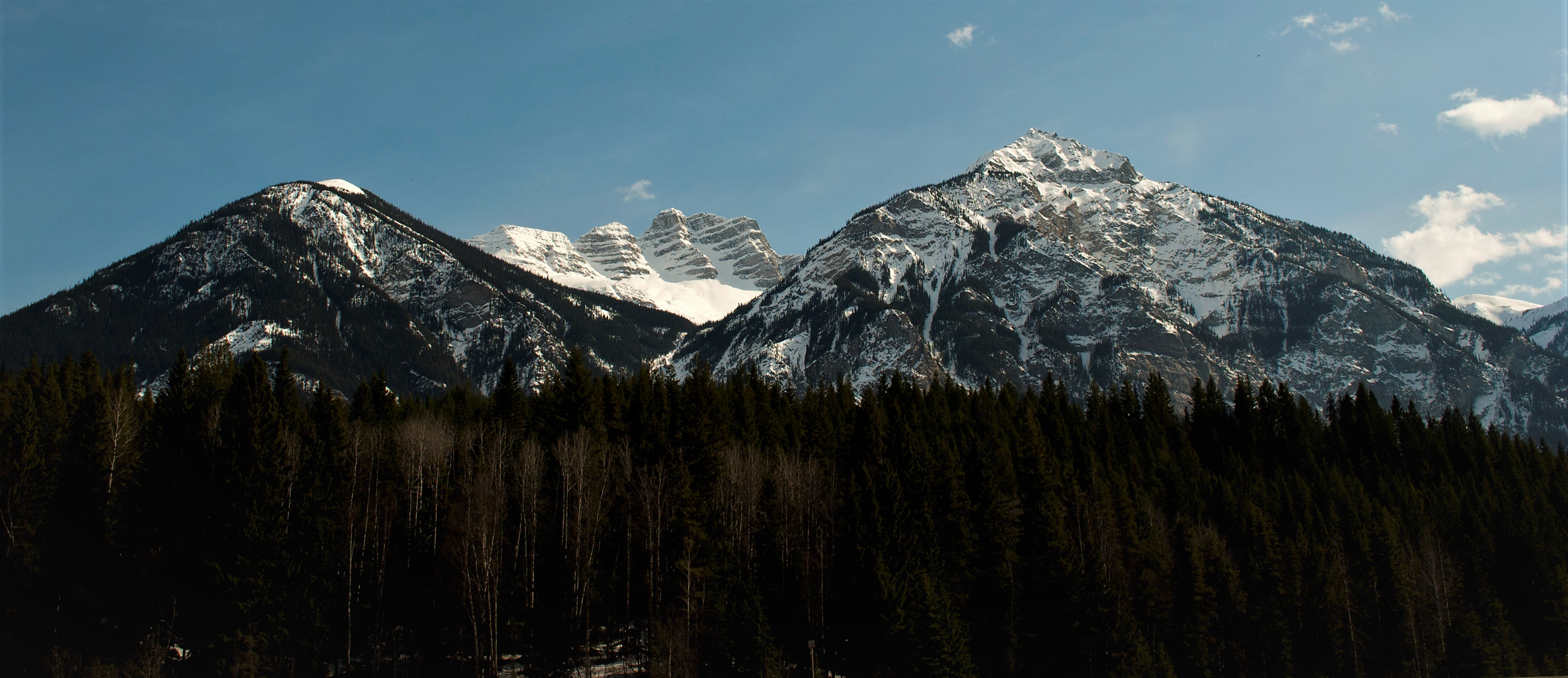
Overlander and Klapperhorn mountains

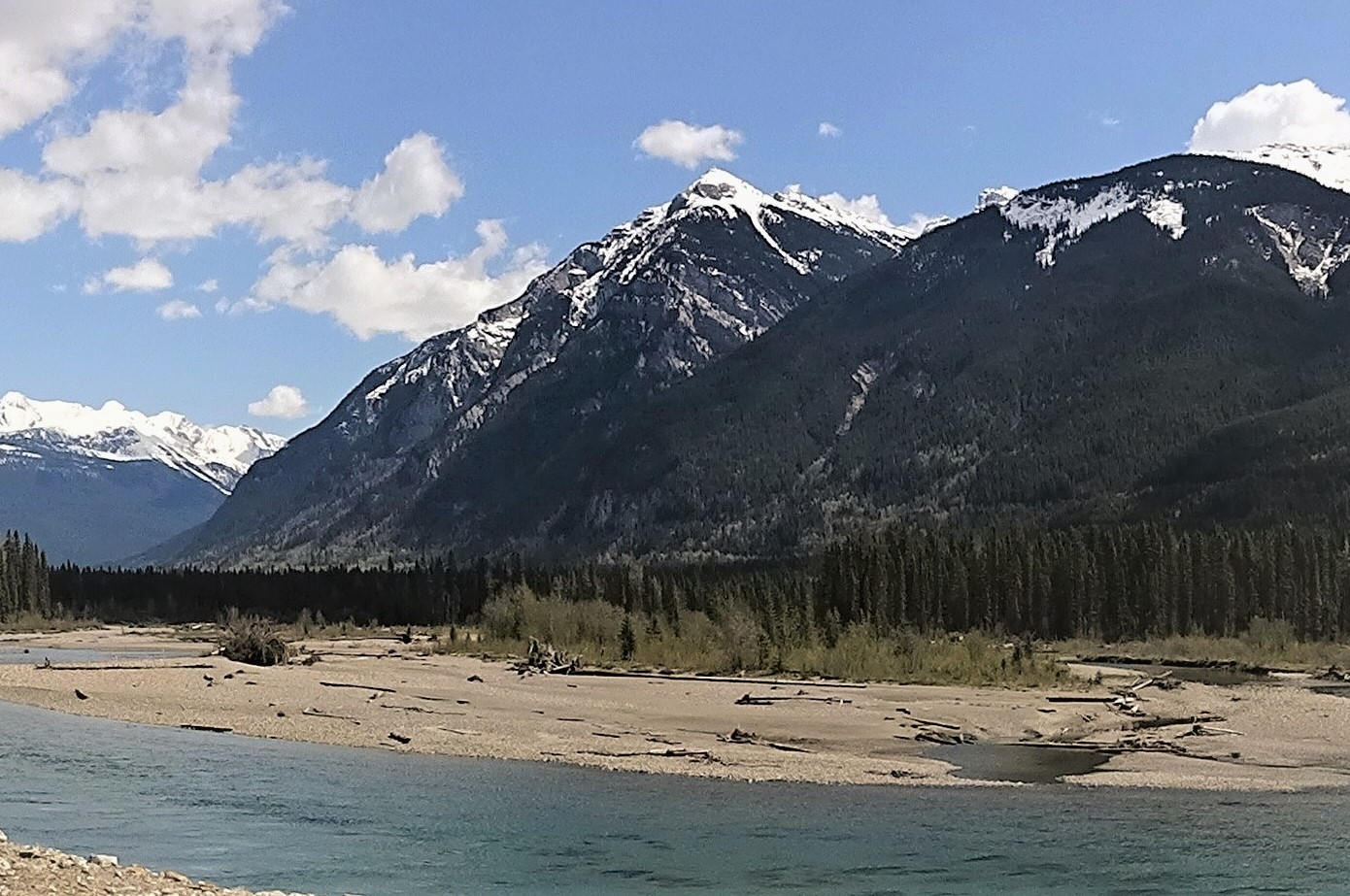
Klapperhorn Mountain viewed from the west along Highway 16

== See also ==
- Geography of British Columbia
