= Rearguard Falls =

Waterfall on the Fraser River in British Columbia, Canada

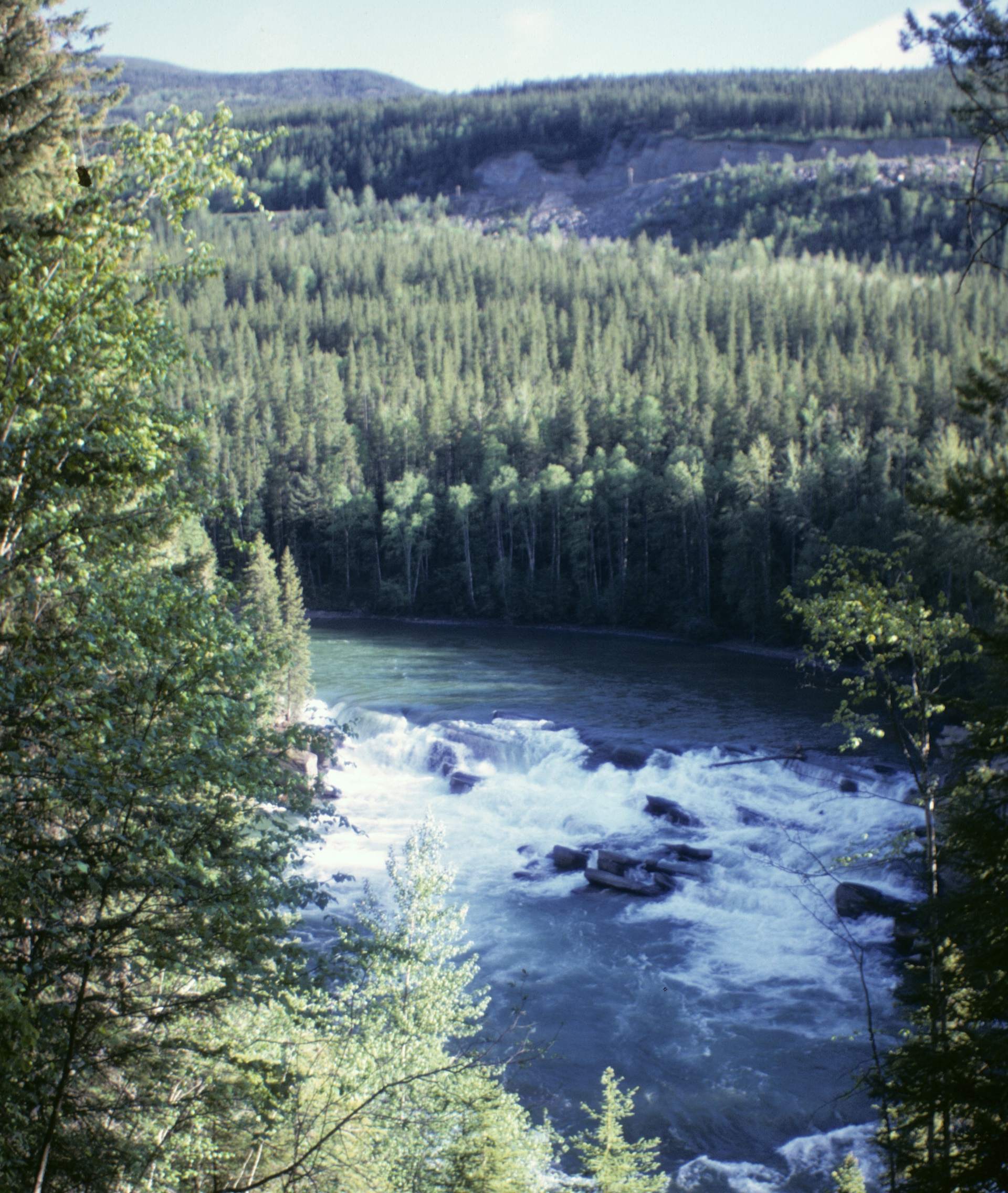
- Rearguard Falls
- Interactive map of Rearguard Falls
- Location: Rearguard Falls Provincial Park, British Columbia, Canada
- Coordinates: 52°58′25″N 119°21′25″W
- Type: Gradual Cascade
- Total height: 6 m (20 ft)
- Number of drops: 1
- Total width: 73 m (240 ft)
- Average width: 61 m (200 ft)
- Watercourse: Fraser River
- Average flow rate: 171 m^{3}/s (6,000 cu ft/s)

Rearguard Falls is located in Rearguard Falls Provincial Park on the Fraser River in British Columbia. The falls are located 115 km (71 mi) downstream from the river's source at Fraser Pass. This is the farthest point that salmon migrate up the Fraser River to spawn, about 1,260 km (783 mi) from the ocean. A boardwalk is installed on the trail leading from the rest area on Yellowhead Highway to the falls, allowing travellers to get a close-up view.

== See also ==
- List of waterfalls
- List of waterfalls in British Columbia
- Overlander Falls, another waterfall on the Fraser just upstream from Rearguard Falls.
