= Della Falls =

Waterfall in Strathcona Provincial Park, British Columbia, Canada

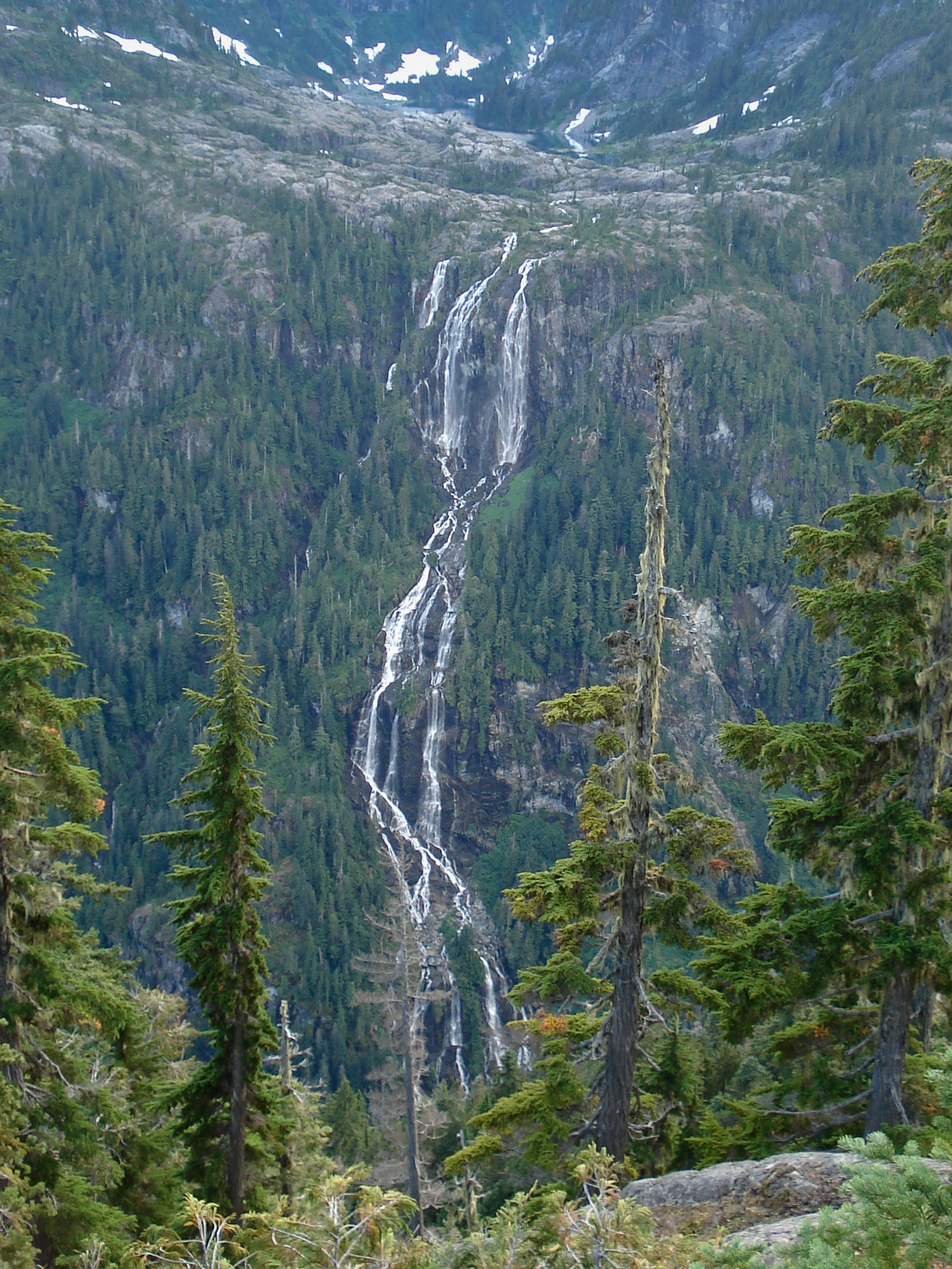
- Della Falls as viewed from Love Lake Trail
- Interactive map of Della Falls
- Location: Strathcona Provincial Park, British Columbia
- Coordinates: 49°27′16″N 125°32′11″W
- Type: Segmented horsetails
- Total height: 440 m (1,440 ft)
- Number of drops: 3
- Total width: 107 m (351 ft)
- Average width: 30 m (98 ft)
- Run: 411 m (1,348 ft)
- Watercourse: Della Creek
- Average flow rate: 1.5 m^{3}/s (53 cu ft/s)
- World height ranking: 172nd

Della Falls is a waterfall located within Strathcona Provincial Park on Vancouver Island in British Columbia, Canada. With a total height of 440 m (1,440 ft), it ranks as the 16th tallest confirmed waterfall in Canada and the second tallest on Vancouver Island after Kiwi Falls in Schoen Lake Provincial Park.

== Discovery ==
In 1899, prospector and trapper Joe Drinkwater discovered Della Falls and named them after his wife. Drinkwater also built a 16 km (10 mi) hiking trail to the falls via Drinkwater Creek. Evidence of his gold mining operation, including an aerial tramway he built, can still be seen near the falls.

== Access ==
The only way to reach Della Falls, other than by helicopter, is by crossing the entire Great Central Lake by boat; the only road access to the lake is at the opposite side from Strathcona Park. After the 35 km (21 mi) crossing, there is a dock that marks the beginning of Strathcona Park, and a camping area which can be used as a base camp before trying the next 15 km (9 mi) ascent to the base of Della Falls. More campsites are available along the trail and near the base of the falls. The hike, part of which follows an old logging railway, takes about seven hours one way and is suitable for intermediate level hikers.

== See also ==
- List of waterfalls
- List of waterfalls of Canada
- List of waterfalls in British Columbia
