= Cinnamon Mountain =

Mountain in Colorado, United States

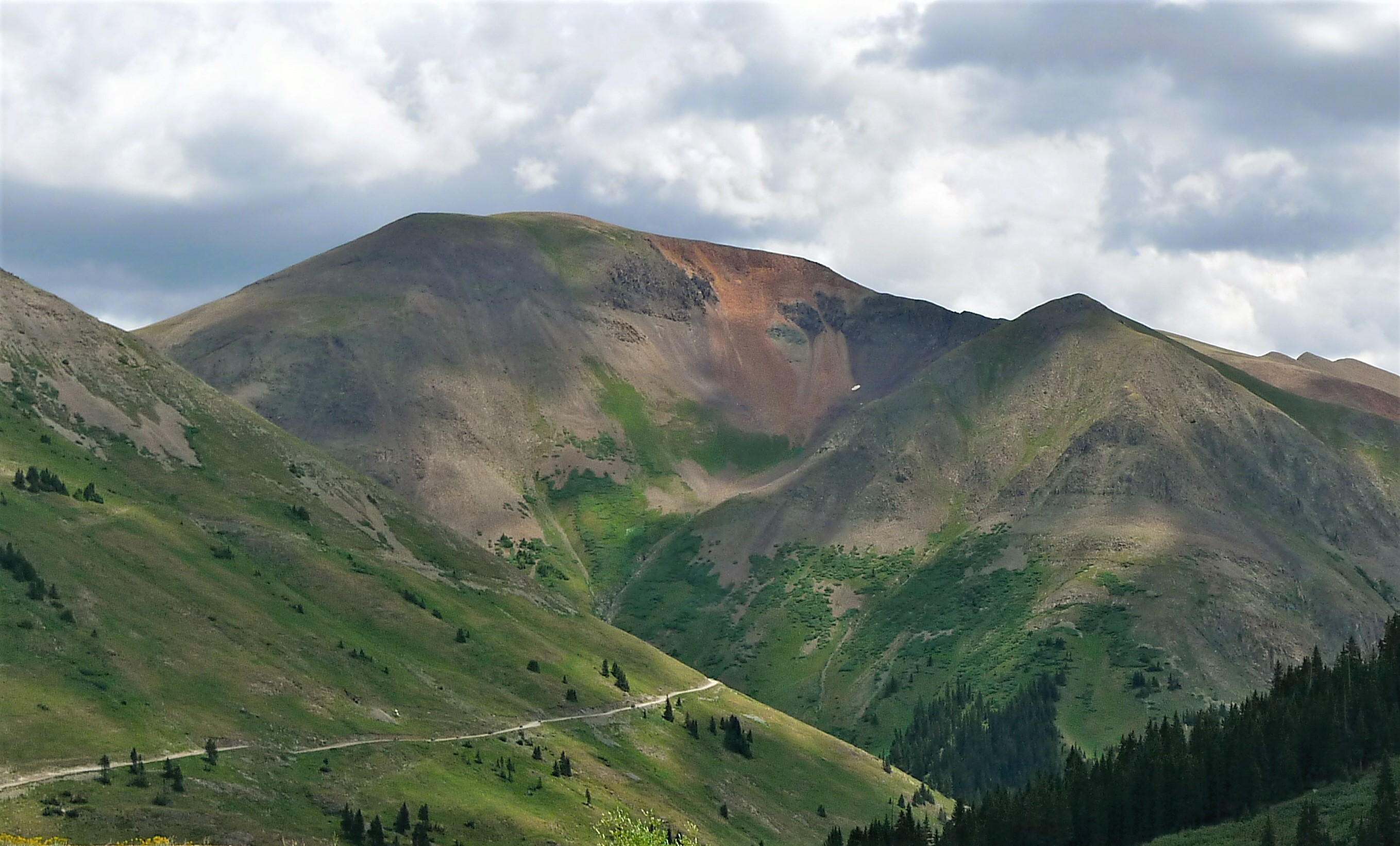
- West aspect

Highest point
- Elevation: 13,336 ft (4,065 m)
- Prominence: 293 ft (89 m)
- Parent peak: Handies Peak (14,048 ft)
- Isolation: 1.08 mi (1.74 km)
- Coordinates: 37°55′47″N 107°32′45″W

Geography
- Location within Colorado Location within the United States
- Country: United States
- State: Colorado
- County: San Juan
- Parent range: Rocky Mountains; San Juan Mountains
- Topo map: USGS Handies Peak

Climbing
- Easiest route: class 2

Cinnamon Mountain is a 13,336-foot-elevation (4,065-meter) summit in San Juan County, Colorado, United States.

== Description ==
Cinnamon Mountain is located 10.5 miles (16.9 km) northeast of the community of Silverton and 1.5 miles (2.4 km) east of Animas Forks, on land administered by the Bureau of Land Management. Cinnamon is situated seven miles (11 km) west of the Continental Divide in the San Juan Mountains which are a subrange of the Rocky Mountains. Precipitation runoff from the mountain drains into the Animas River and topographic relief is significant as the summit rises over 2,400 feet (730 meters) above the river in one mile (1.6 km). Access to the mountain is via the Alpine Loop Back Country Byway at Cinnamon Pass. The mountain's toponym has been officially adopted by the United States Board on Geographic Names.

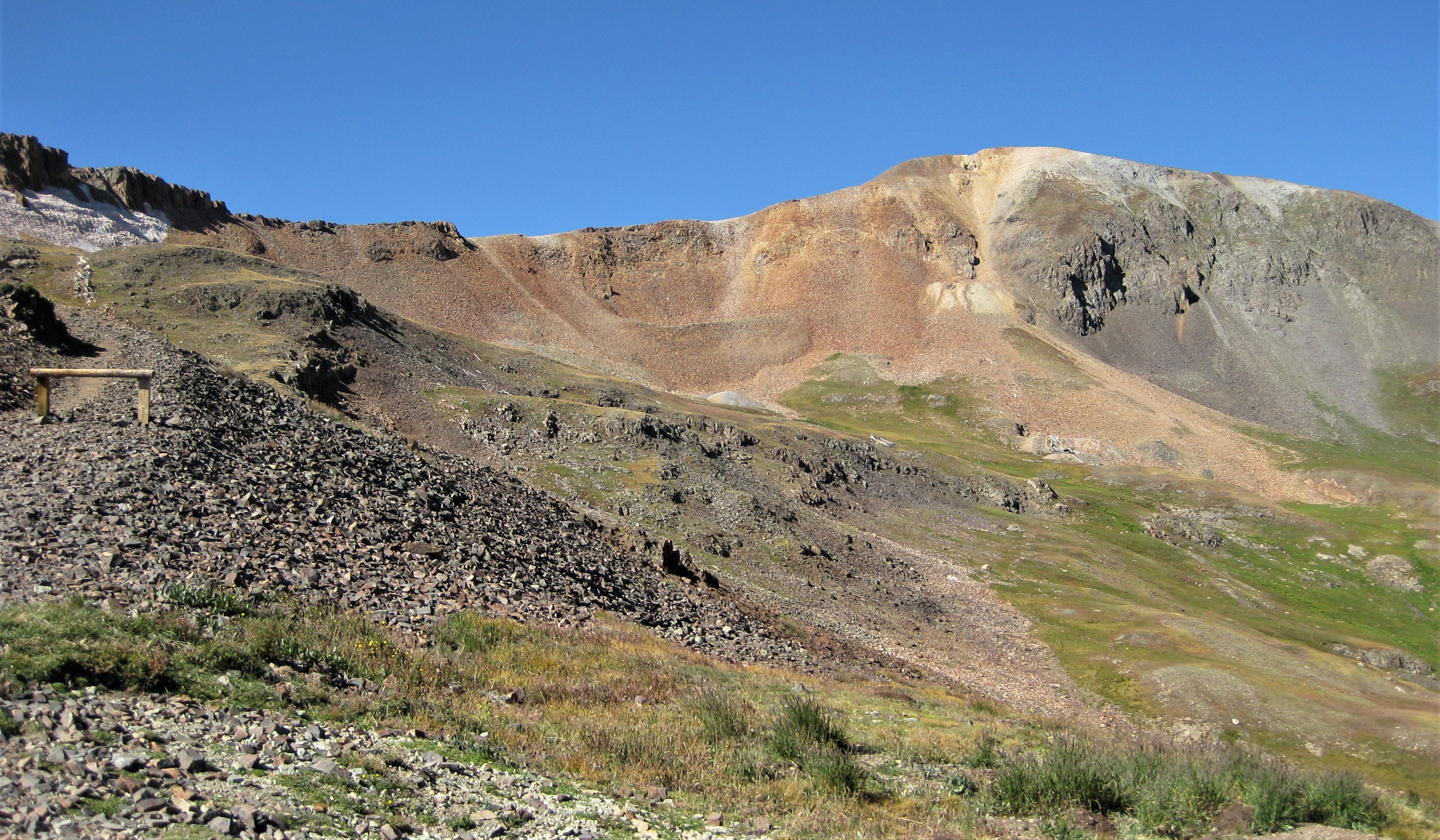
Northeast aspect of Cinnamon Mountain viewed from Cinnamon Pass

== Climate ==
According to the Köppen climate classification system, Cinnamon Mountain is located in an alpine subarctic climate zone with cold, snowy winters, and cool to warm summers. Due to its altitude, it receives precipitation all year, as snow in winter and as thunderstorms in summer, with a dry period in late spring. Hikers can expect afternoon rain, hail, and lightning from the seasonal monsoon in late July and August.

== See also ==
- Mountains of San Juan County, Colorado
- Thirteener
