= Schoen Lake Provincial Park =

Provincial park in northeastern Vancouver Island, British Columbia, Canada

- IUCN category II (national park)
- Location within Vancouver Island Location within British Columbia
- Interactive map of Schoen Lake Provincial Park
- Location: Mount Waddington RD, British Columbia, Canada
- Nearest town: Woss
- Coordinates: 50°11′00″N 126°14′00″W
- Area: 8,775 ha (33.88 sq mi)
- Established: October 28, 1977
- Governing body: BC Parks

Schoen Lake Provincial Park is a provincial park in northeastern Vancouver Island, British Columbia, Canada, located east of the community of Woss Lake and southwest of Sayward. The park lies inside the Nimpkish Valley watershed. On October 28, 1977, the "Class A" park was officially created to protect, exhibit and interpret an example of the natural features and processes of the Insular Mountains Natural Region. The park covers a total area of 8,775 hectares (21,684 acres). Within those hectares of park land is a number of lakes, creeks and mountain ranges.

== Geography ==
The largest lake is Schoen Lake which is 5 km (3.1 mi) long and has a mean depth of 252 ft (77 m).

Kiwi Falls is a prominent horsetail waterfall that cascades down from the mountains southeast of Schoen Lake. With a total height of 475 m (1,558 ft), it ranks as the 8th tallest confirmed waterfall in British Columbia and the tallest on Vancouver Island.

== Ecology ==
The higher elevations of the park surrounding Schoen Lake also consist of mountain hemlock, Pacific Silver Fir and Yellow Cedar with the majority residing in old growth forests around the upper portions of the lake. Wildlife in the area consists primarily of black bears, Columbian black-tailed deer, cougars, Roosevelt elk and wolves. The Adams River herd of Roosevelt Elk use the valley bottoms, wetland areas and avalanche chutes for their summer ranges in Schoen Lake Provincial Park. Roosevelt Elk rut in the fall season and can usually be observed frequently in the Nisnak Meadows area of the park.

Columbian black-tailed deer use the old growth forests that make up Schoen Lake Provincial Park as their summer and winter ranges. Because deer require at least 65% covered canopy within old growth forests to be able to survive the winter months, Schoen Lake Provincial Park plays a vital role in their survival. The numbers of Columbian black-tailed deer within the park during the mid-1970s was high but because of the increasing wolf predation, their numbers have decreased substantially since.

Waterfowl in Schoen Lake Provincial Park is limited to loons and mergansers but the Nisnak Meadows and upper meadows in the Nisnak Lake area are very important for migrating waterfowl as reported in the Canada Land Inventory classification on land capability for waterfowl.

== Facilities ==
At the west end of Schoen Lake is a 9 site campground with a natural boat launch. Nestled in old growth forest consisting of coastal Western Hemlock, Douglas Fir, Red Alder and Western Red Cedar, the campgrounds offer prime access to recreation activities that lead to a true remote wilderness experience.

The campgrounds offer picnic tables, pit toilets, fire pits and a camp host during the months of May to September. The road into the campground from highway 19 is narrow and rough and not maintained. Campers, motor homes, rv's and vehicles towing trailers use the road access regularly despite the challenges associated with the poor condition of the gravel road.
