= Columbia Country =

Geographic region of British Columbia, Canada

Coordinates: 50°N 117°W

Columbia Country refers to the upper basin of the Columbia River in the Canadian province of British Columbia. It includes a smaller region known as the Columbia Valley, near the river's headwaters at Columbia Lake in the Rocky Mountain Trench, as well as the Big Bend of that river, now mostly inundated by Kinbasket Lake and Revelstoke Lake.

The area has no precisely defined boundaries, but conventionally Columbia Country encompasses the region upstream of Revelstoke, as the Arrow Lakes are generally referred to as a region in their own right, or as part of the West Kootenay. The lower Columbia, around the cities of Castlegar and Trail, is generally considered part of the West Kootenay, not the Columbia Country.

== Usages ==
References to Columbia Country appears in the names of "twinned" region names like Columbia-Kootenay or Columbia-Shuswap. The former refers to the East Kootenay, the latter to the Revelstoke-Big Bend region, plus perhaps Golden.

== See also ==
- Columbia River Drainage Basin
