= Overlander Falls =

Waterfall in Mount Robson Provincial Park, British Columbia, Canada

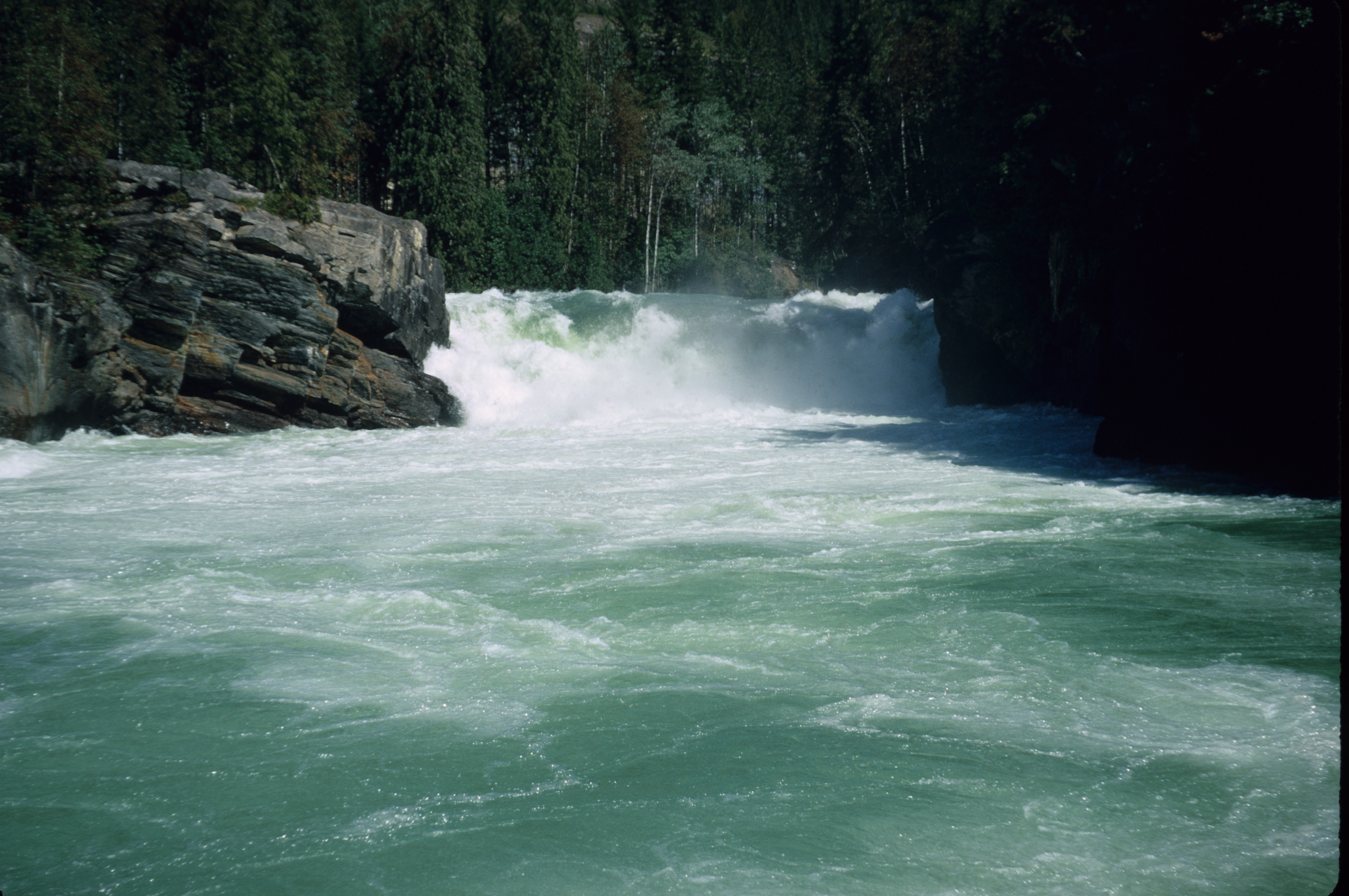
- Overlander Falls
- Interactive map of Overlander Falls
- Location: Mount Robson Provincial Park, British Columbia, Canada
- Coordinates: 53°02′00″N 119°12′00″W
- Type: Block
- Total height: 9 m (30 ft)
- Number of drops: 1
- Total width: 23 m (75 ft)
- Average width: 18 m (59 ft)
- Watercourse: Fraser River
- Average flow rate: 79 m^{3}/s (2,800 cu ft/s)

Overlander Falls is a waterfall on the Fraser River in Mount Robson Provincial Park, British Columbia, Canada. It is popular for kayakers. The falls are reached by a short walking trail which starts on the Yellowhead Highway 2 km (1.2 mi) east of the Mount Robson visitor centre. The waterfall is named for the Overlanders expedition of 1862. A group of 175 men and 1 woman from Ontario travelled across the prairies and through the Rocky Mountains, intending to reach the Barkerville or Cariboo goldfields. Just west of Overlander Falls, the group split. About half continued down the Fraser River, eventually reaching Barkerville in late fall of 1862, but over a year had elapsed since Billy Barker's gold strike and there were no claims left to stake. The other half abandoned their dreams of gold and rafted down the North Thompson River to Fort Kamloops.

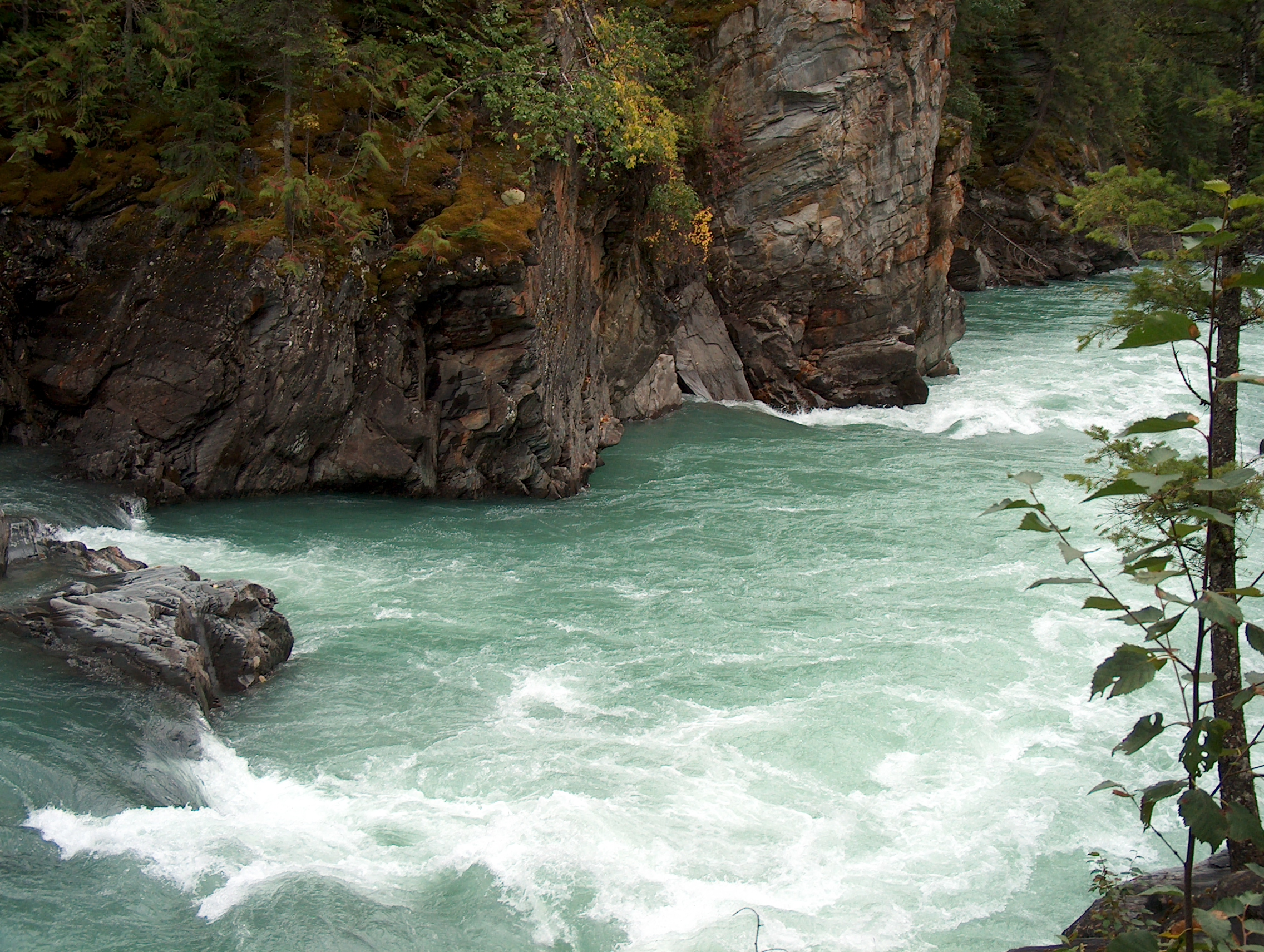
Rapids on Fraser River below Overlander Falls

== See also ==
- List of waterfalls
- List of waterfalls in British Columbia
- Rearguard Falls
- Overlander Mountain
