= Basalt Falls =

Waterfall in British Colombia, Canada

Coordinates: 52°47′54″N 125°32′45″W

Basalt Falls is a waterfall on the Dean River in the Chilcotin District of the Central Interior of British Columbia, located north of the community of Anahim Lake. It is approximately 12 feet (3.7 m) in height and is composed of columnar basalt of the Chilcotin Group.

== See also ==
- List of waterfalls
- List of waterfalls in British Columbia
- Anahim Volcanic Belt
- Anahim hotspot
