= Cinnamon Peak =

Mountain summit in British Columbia, Canada

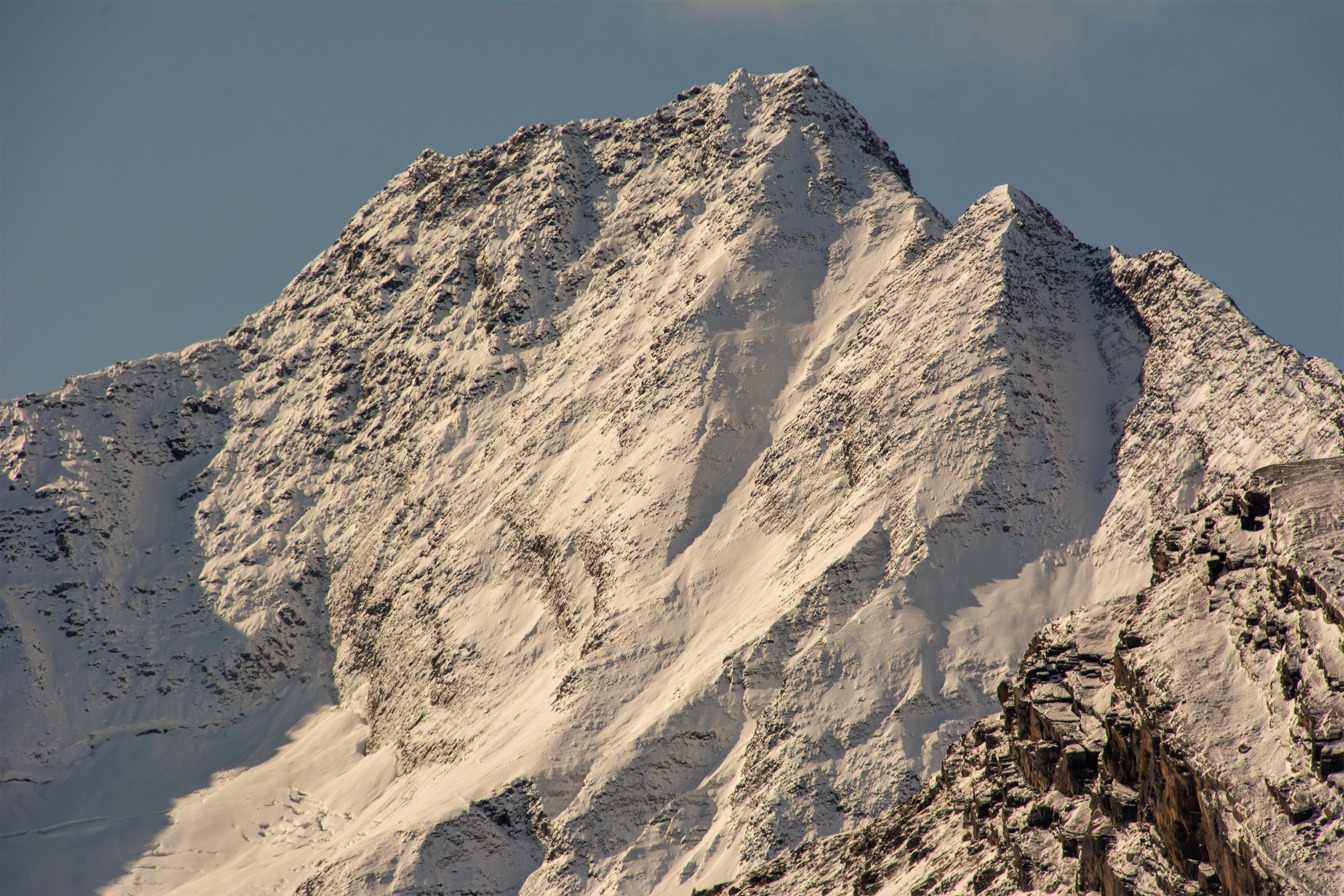
- Northeast face

Highest point
- Elevation: 2,727 m (8,947 ft)
- Prominence: 337 m (1,106 ft)
- Parent peak: Whitehorn Mountain (3399 m)
- Listing: Mountains of British Columbia
- Coordinates: 53°04′47″N 119°15′26″W

Geography
- Location within British Columbia Location within Canada
- Interactive map of Cinnamon Peak
- Country: Canada
- Province: British Columbia
- District: Cariboo Land District
- Protected area: Mount Robson Provincial Park
- Parent range: Park Ranges; Canadian Rockies
- Topo map: NTS 83E3 Mount Robson

Climbing
- Easiest route: Scrambling

Cinnamon Peak is a 2,727-metre (8,947-foot) mountain summit located in the northwestern part of Mount Robson Provincial Park, in the Canadian Rockies of British Columbia, Canada. It is situated immediately north of the confluence of the Robson River and the Fraser River, and is visible from the Yellowhead Highway near the park's visitor centre. The peak was labelled "Little Grizzly" on Arthur Oliver Wheeler's 1911 topographic map of Mount Robson. He thought it appeared similar to Mount Grizzly in the Selkirk Mountains, but the name was later changed to Cinnamon, which is the colour of the peak and the Cinnamon bear, which can be easily mistaken for a grizzly bear. "Little Grizzly" is a colloquial term for the black bear, Ursus americanus. Eastern populations are typically black in colour, however western populations can be cinnamon coloured. The mountain's toponym was officially adopted in 1951 by the Geographical Names Board of Canada. The nearest higher peak is Whitehorn Mountain, 6.0 km (3.7 mi) to the north.

== Climate ==
Based on the Köppen climate classification, Cinnamon Peak is located in a subarctic climate zone with cold, snowy winters, and mild summers. Temperatures in winter can drop below −20 °C with wind chill factors below −30 °C. This climate supports an unnamed glacier on the northeast slope of the mountain. The months June through September usually offer the most favorable weather to view or climb the peak. Precipitation runoff from Cinnamon Peak drains into Swiftcurrent Creek and the Robson River, both of which are tributaries of the Fraser River.

== Gallery ==
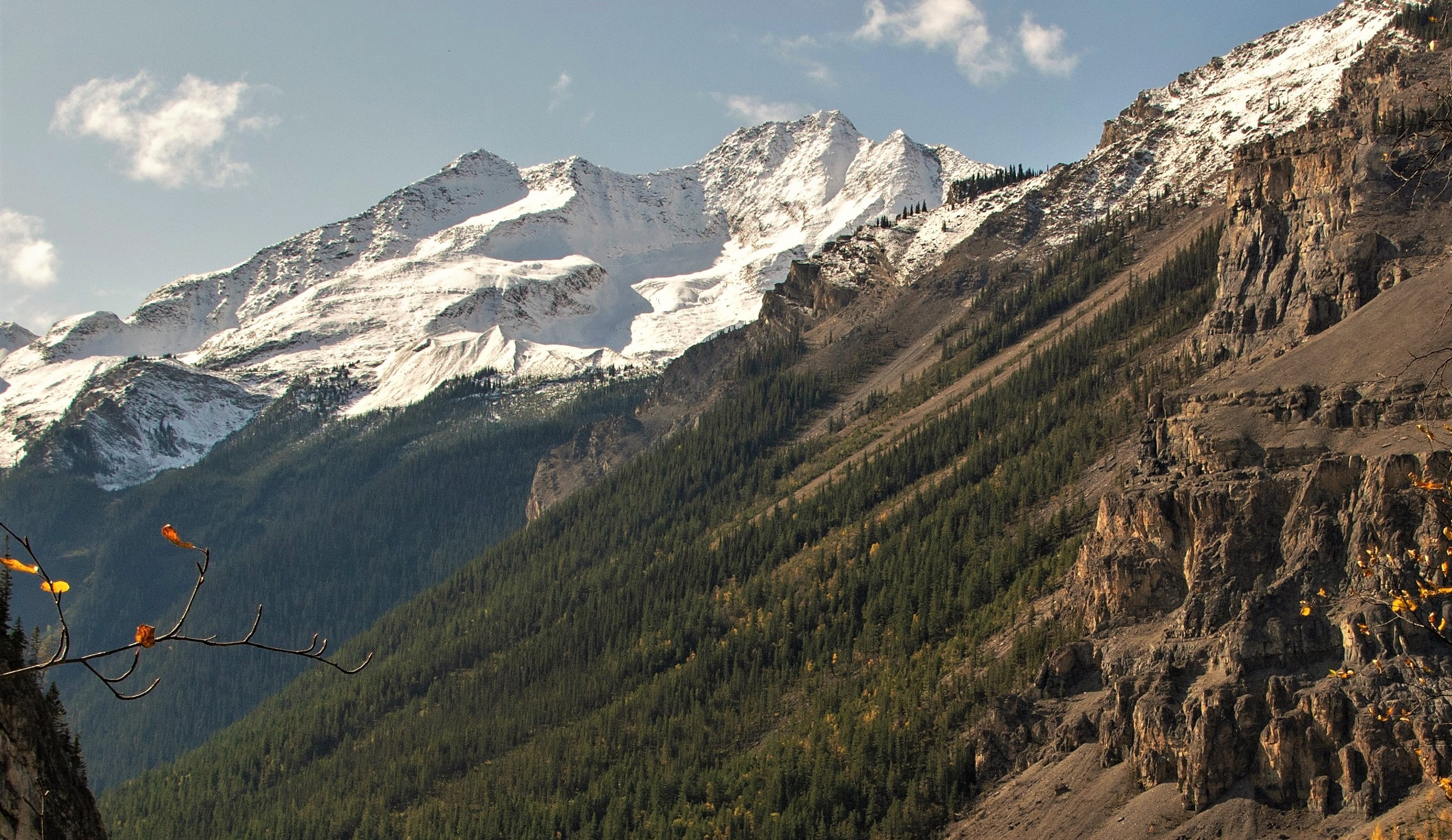
Cinnamon Peak in autumn

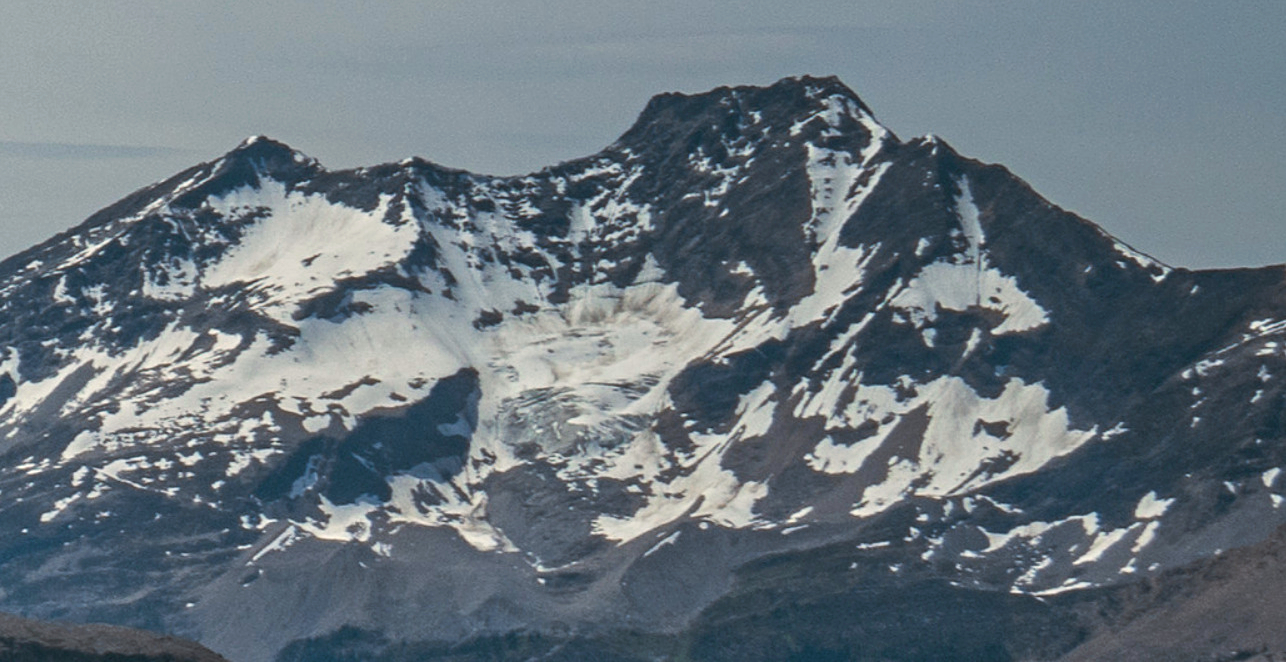
Cinnamon Peak, glacier centered

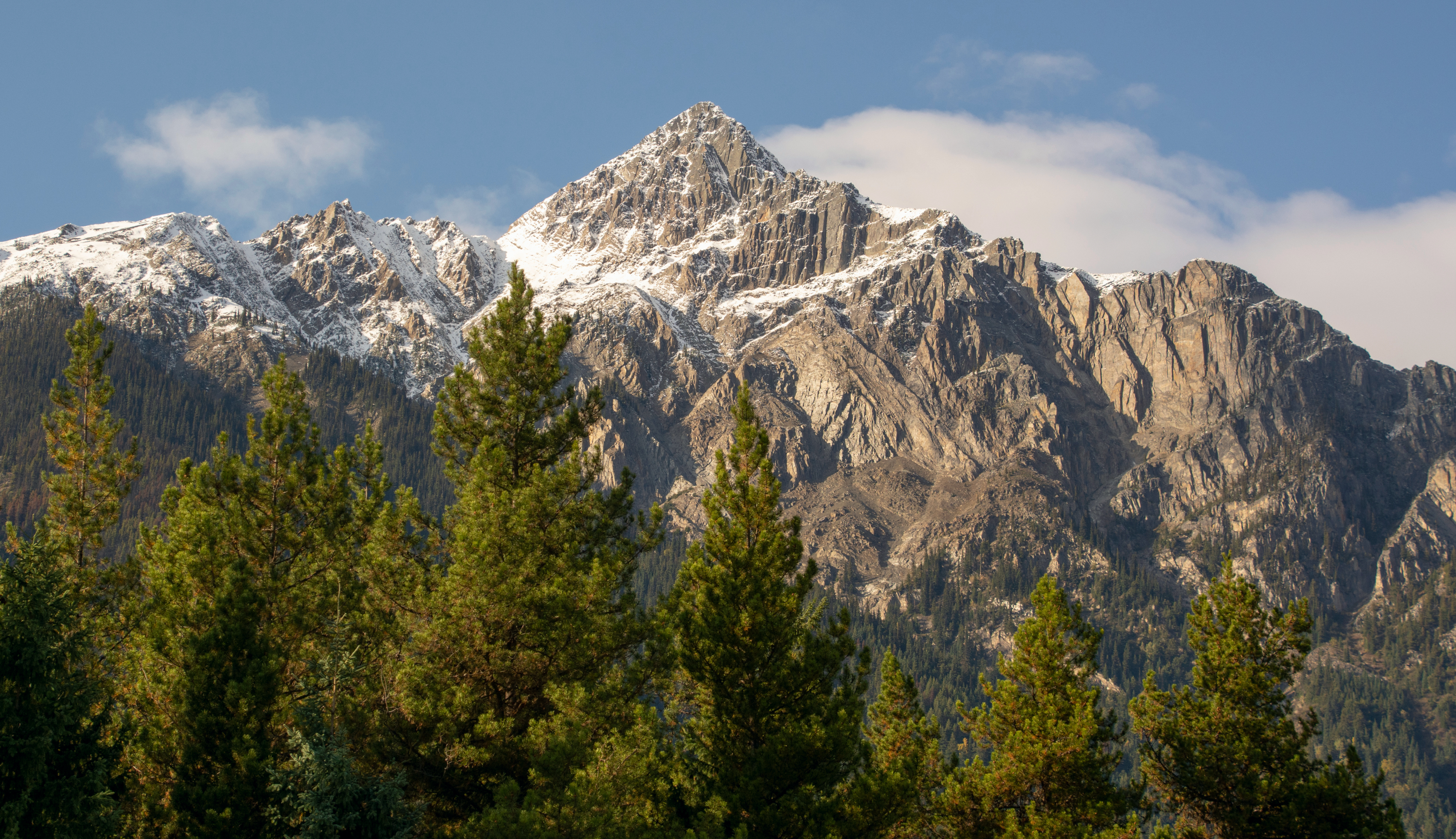
South aspect

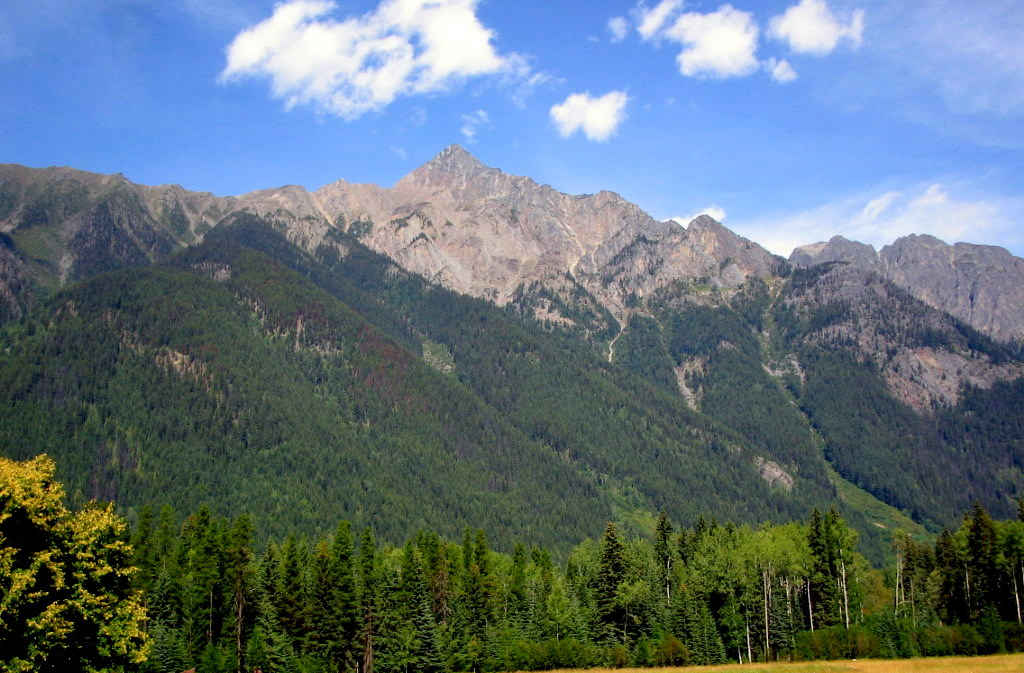
Cinnamon Peak, south aspect

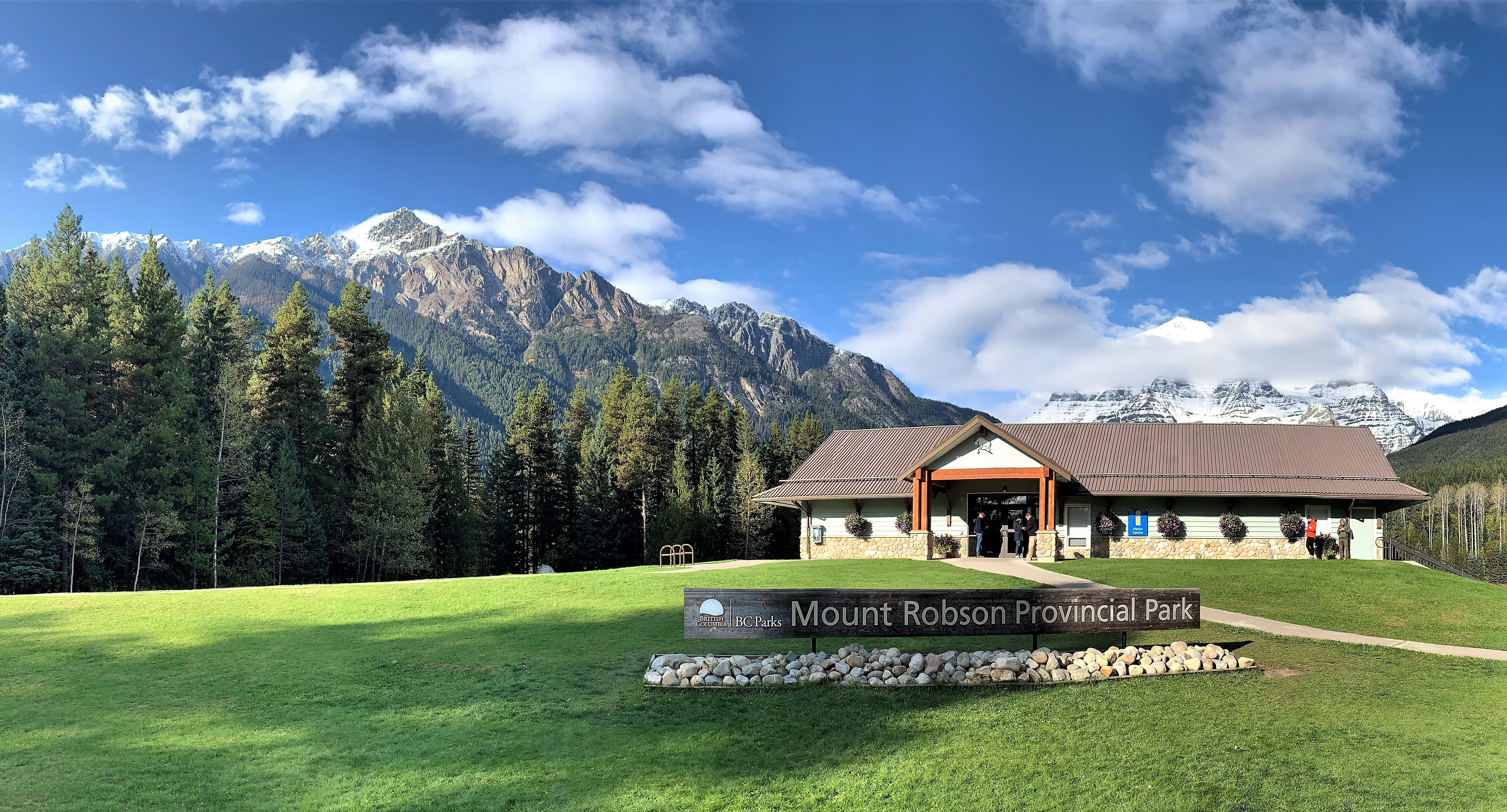
South aspect of Cinnamon Peak (left) and Mount Robson Provincial Park visitor centre.

== See also ==
- List of mountains in the Canadian Rockies
- Geography of British Columbia
