= List of waterfalls in Canada =

The following list of waterfalls of Canada include all waterfalls of superlative significance.

== Tallest waterfalls ==
=== By overall height ===
As of 2020, there are 18 confirmed waterfalls with an overall height of at least 400 m (1,300 ft).

| Waterfall | Image | Height | | Province | Coordinates |
| Waterfall | Image | m | ft | Province | Coordinates |
|---|---|---|---|---|---|
| James Bruce Falls | | 840 | 2,760 | British Columbia | 50°13′08″N 123°46′57″W |
| Madden Falls | | 579 | 1,900 | British Columbia | 49°53′20″N 123°19′01″W |
| Swiftcurrent Falls | | 537 | 1,762 | British Columbia | 53°07′49″N 119°19′03″W |
| Kingcome Valley Falls | | 520 | 1,710 | British Columbia | 51°16′10″N 126°12′46″W |
| Schwartzenbach Falls | | 520 | 1,710 | Nunavut | 66°30′30″N 65°31′30″W |
| Francis Falls | | 518 | 1,699 | British Columbia | 50°39′33″N 124°11′47″W |
| Storey Peak Falls | | 480 | 1,570 | British Columbia | 50°00′17″N 123°21′53″W |
| Cerberus Falls | | 475 | 1,558 | British Columbia | 51°53′39″N 117°04′19″W |
| Kiwi Falls | | 475 | 1,558 | British Columbia | 50°09′18″N 126°12′44″W |
| Bush Mountain Falls | | 466 | 1,529 | British Columbia | 51°49′22″N 117°08′01″W |
| Unnamed waterfall | | 460 | 1,510 | British Columbia | 51°17′56″N 125°44′16″W |
| Bedard Falls | | 457 | 1,499 | British Columbia | 49°58′53″N 123°20′49″W |
| Unnamed waterfall | | 457 | 1,499 | British Columbia | 50°18′45″N 123°56′09″W |
| Harmony Falls | | 444 | 1,457 | British Columbia | 49°51′23″N 123°59′55″W |
| Michael Falls | | 442 | 1,450 | British Columbia | 51°28′25″N 116°31′07″W |
| Della Falls | | 440 | 1,440 | British Columbia | 49°27′16″N 125°32′11″W |
| South Phillips Glacier Falls | | 427 | 1,401 | British Columbia | 53°07′24″N 119°13′23″W |
| Bishop Falls | | 410 | 1,350 | British Columbia | 58°40′31″N 133°27′12″W |

=== By tallest single drop ===
As of 2020, there are 14 confirmed waterfalls to have a single unbroken drop with a height of at least 150 m (490 ft).

| Waterfall | Image | Height | | Province | Coordinates |
| Waterfall | Image | m | ft | Province | Coordinates |
|---|---|---|---|---|---|
| Cerberus Falls | | 475 | 1,558 | British Columbia | 51°53′39″N 117°04′19″W |
| Odegaard Falls | | 271 | 889 | British Columbia | 52°14′29″N 126°17′33″W |
| Hunlen Falls | | 260 | 850 | British Columbia | 52°16′36″N 125°46′21″W |
| Takakkaw Falls | | 260 | 850 | British Columbia | 51°30′00″N 116°28′23″W |
| Hamill Creek Falls | | 255 | 837 | British Columbia | 50°14′24″N 116°35′06″W |
| Pissing Mare Falls | | 255 | 837 | Newfoundland and Labrador | 49°42′37″N 57°39′39″W |
| Francis Falls | | 244 | 801 | British Columbia | 50°39′33″N 124°11′47″W |
| South Phillips Glacier Falls | | 244 | 801 | British Columbia | 53°07′24″N 119°13′23″W |
| Middle Cummins Falls | | 220 | 720 | British Columbia | 52°10′00″N 117°59′25″W |
| Schwartzenbach Falls | | 200 | 660 | Nunavut | 66°30′30″N 65°31′30″W |
| Michael Falls | | 158 | 518 | British Columbia | 51°28′25″N 116°31′07″W |
| Bow Glacier Falls | | 154 | 505 | Alberta | 51°39′12″N 116°29′57″W |
| Lady Wilsons Falls | | 152 | 499 | Alberta | 52°01′37″N 116°49′00″W |
| Madden Falls | | 152 | 499 | British Columbia | 49°53′20″N 123°19′01″W |

== Waterfalls by average flow rate ==
As of 2021, there are 25 confirmed waterfalls with an average flow rate or discharge of at least 100 m^{3}/s (3,500 cu ft/s).

| Waterfall | Image | Discharge | | Province | Coordinates |
| Waterfall | Image | m^{3}/s | ft^{3}/s | Province | Coordinates |
|---|---|---|---|---|---|
| Niagara Falls | | 2,407 | 85,000 | Ontario / New York (U.S.) | 43°04′38″N 79°04′32″W |
| Vermilion Falls | | 1,812 | 64,000 | Alberta | 58°22′11″N 114°52′18″W |
| Limestone Falls | | 1,464 | 51,700 | Quebec | 57°28′45″N 69°18′36″W |
| Pyrite Falls | | 1,464 | 51,700 | Quebec | 57°26′00″N 69°14′32″W |
| Virginia Falls | | 1,000 | 35,000 | Northwest Territories | 61°36′26″N 125°44′12″W |
| Shale Falls | | 934 | 33,000 | Quebec | 56°44′39″N 69°01′04″W |
| Chaudière Falls | | 500 | 18,000 | Quebec | 46°42′53″N 71°16′57″W |
| Granite Falls | | 453 | 16,000 | Quebec | 55°50′42″N 68°25′25″W |
| Little Eaton Canyon Falls | | 317 | 11,200 | Quebec | 55°31′46″N 68°17′40″W |
| Lower Eaton Canyon Falls | | 317 | 11,200 | Quebec | 55°33′46″N 68°11′50″W |
| Nastapoca Falls | | 317 | 11,200 | Quebec | 56°54′54″N 76°31′46″W |
| Tuktu Falls | | 317 | 11,200 | Quebec | 55°32′36″N 68°14′44″W |
| Twin Falls | | 317 | 11,200 | Quebec | 56°53′54″N 76°24′12″W |
| Upper Eaton Canyon Falls | | 317 | 11,200 | Quebec | 55°33′29″N 68°12′57″W |
| Alexandra Falls | | 282 | 10,000 | Northwest Territories | 60°30′02″N 116°16′45″W |
| Louise Falls | | 282 | 10,000 | Northwest Territories | 60°30′12″N 116°14′29″W |
| Rearguard Falls | | 171 | 6,000 | British Columbia | 52°58′24″N 119°21′51″W |
| Montmorency Falls | | 130 | 4,600 | Quebec | 46°53′27″N 71°8′51″W |
| Baileys Chute | | 122 | 4,300 | British Columbia | 52°04′19″N 120°11′33″W |
| Marcus Falls | | 122 | 4,300 | British Columbia | 52°04′28″N 120°12′00″W |
| Athabasca Falls | | 113 | 4,000 | Alberta | 52°39′51″N 117°53′01″W |
| Osprey Falls | | 113 | 4,000 | British Columbia | 52°08′24″N 120°11′36″W |
| Dawson Falls | | 107 | 3,800 | British Columbia | 51°57′55″N 120°07′25″W |
| Helmcken Falls | | 107 | 3,800 | British Columbia | 51°57′14″N 120°10′40″W |
| The Mushbowl | | 107 | 3,800 | British Columbia | 51°57′51″N 120°07′48″W |

== Notable waterfalls by province ==
=== Alberta ===
| Waterfall | Image | Watercourse | Drop | Width | Type | Coordinates | Ref |
|---|---|---|---|---|---|---|---|
| Athabasca Falls | | Athabasca River | 24 m (79 ft) | 18 m (59 ft) | Segmented Horsetail | 52°39′51″N 117°53′01″W | |
| Bow Falls | | Bow River | 9 m (30 ft) | 37 m (121 ft) | Cascade | 51°9′57″N 115°33′35″W | |
| Bow Glacier Falls | | Bow River | 120 m (390 ft) | 57 m (187 ft) | Horsetail | 51°39′11″N 116°29′57″W | |
| Bridal Veil Falls (Banff) | | An unnamed stream | 86 m (282 ft) | 5 m (16 ft) | Tiered Plunges | 52°11′01″N 117°03′07″W | |
| Crescent Falls | | Bighorn River | | | Tiered | 52°23′14″N 116°21′15″W | |
| Crypt Falls | | Hellroaring Creek | 175 m (574 ft) | 15 m (49 ft) | Horsetail | 49°0′18″N 113°50′35″W | |
| Elbow Falls | | Elbow River | | | Cascade | 50°51′31″N 114°47′32″W | |
| Fossil Falls | | Foch Creek | 150 m (490 ft) | 23 m (75 ft) | Tiered Horsetails | 50°35′28″N 115°11′56″W | |
| Geraldine Falls | | Geraldine Creek | 152 m (499 ft) | 15 m (49 ft) | Tiered Horsetails | 52°36′01″N 117°56′20″W | |
| Kerkeslin Falls | | An unnamed stream | | | Tiered Horsetails | disputed (Note: The identity and location of this waterfall is uncertain; one location is given at worldwaterfalldatabase.com and the other is reported by ice climbers.) | |
| Kitchener Creek Falls | | Kitchener Creek | 122 m (400 ft) | 122 m (400 ft) | 5 m (16 ft) | 52°15′31″N 117°18′11″W | |
| Lineham Falls | | Lineham Creek | 125 m (410 ft) | | | 49°04′40″N 114°03′21″W | |
| Lower Sunwapta Falls | | Sunwapta River | 17 m (56 ft), 26 m (85 ft) | 8 m (26 ft), 8 m (26 ft) | Tiered Horsetails, Tiered Plunges | 52°31′57″N 117°38′42″W | , |
| Maligne Canyon Falls | | Maligne Canyon | | | | | |
| Murchison Falls | | An unnamed stream | 180 m (590 ft) | 30 m (98 ft) | Segmented Plunges | 51°55′09″N 116°41′15″W | |
| O'Shaughnessy Falls | | | | | | | |
| Panther Falls | | Nigel Creek | 66 m (217 ft) | 12 m (39 ft) | Plunge | 52°10′54″N 117°3′29″W | |
| Sideways Falls (Big Bend Falls) | | An unnamed stream | 106 m (348 ft) | 15 m (49 ft) | Tiered Horsetails | 52°09′46″N 117°04′01″W | |
| Siffleur Falls | | Siffleur River | | | | 52°1′14″N 116°21′58″W | |
| Snake Indian Falls | | Snake Indian River | | | | | |
| Tangle Falls | | | | | | | |

=== Manitoba ===
| Image | Waterfall | Watercourse | Drop | Width | Type | Coordinates | Ref |
|---|---|---|---|---|---|---|---|
| Kwasitchewan Falls | | Grass River | 14 m (46 ft) | | | 55°15′55″N 98°17′22″W | |
| McGillvray Falls | | | | | | | |
| Muhigan Falls | | Muhigan River | 19 m (62 ft) | | | 54°41′17″N 98°35′31″W | |
| Pisew Falls | | Grass River | 13 m (43 ft) | 47 m (154 ft) | | 55°11′50″N 98°23′51″W | |
| Rainbow Falls | | | | | | | |
| Sturgeon Falls | | | | | | | |
| Wekusko Falls | The Wekusko falls snakes its way down a drop in the river, around many large boulders, and underneath a pedestrian bridge. | Grass River | | | | 54°47′23″N 99°58′22″W | |
| Whitemouth Falls | | | | | | | |

=== New Brunswick ===
| Waterfall | Image | Watercourse | Drop | Width | Type | Coordinates | Ref |
|---|---|---|---|---|---|---|---|
| Grand Falls | | Saint Croix River | | | | 45°16′30″N 67°28′43″W | |
| Nepisiguit (Grand) Falls | "Grand Falls, Nepisiguit River, before 1874" | Nepisiguit River | 75 m (246 ft) | | Segmented Block | 47°24′19″N 65°47′29″W | |

=== Newfoundland and Labrador ===
| Waterfall | Image | Watercourse | Drop | Width | Type | Coordinates | Ref |
|---|---|---|---|---|---|---|---|
| Aviron Bay Falls | | | 213 m (699 ft) | 12 m (39 ft) | Tiered | | |
| Churchill Falls | | Churchill River | 75 m (246 ft) | | segmented Block | 53°36′00″N 64°18′57″W | |
| Grand Falls | | Exploits River | 43 m (141 ft) | | | | |
| Grand Falls | | Hamilton River | 92 m (302 ft) | 46 m (151 ft) | Slide, Plunge | | |
| Muskrat Falls | | Churchill River | 15 m (49 ft) | | | 53°14′44″N 60°46′17″W | |
| Pissing Mare Falls | | Burnt Woods Brook | 350 m (1,150 ft) | | Plunge, Cascade | | |
| Rattling Brook Falls | | Rattling Brook | 140 m (460 ft) | | Tiered | | |
| Sandy Pond Falls | | | 220 m (720 ft) | | Plunge, Cascades | | |
| Scott Falls | | Unknown River | 27 m (89 ft) | | | | |
| Thomas Falls | | Unknown River | 31 m (102 ft) | | | | |
| Twin Falls | | Unknown River | 53 m (174 ft) | | | | |

=== Northwest Territories ===
| Waterfall | Image | Watercourse | Drop | Width | Type | Coordinates | Ref |
|---|---|---|---|---|---|---|---|
| Alexandra Falls | | Hay River | 33 m (108 ft) | 117 m (384 ft) | Vertical Block | 60°30′02″N 116°16′48″W | |
| Cameron Falls | | Cameron River | 17 m (56 ft) | | Steep cascade | 62°31′14″N 113°41′16″W | |
| Lady Evelyn Falls | | Kakisa River | 17 m (56 ft) | 116 m (381 ft) | Vertical Block | 60°57′53″N 117°19′46″W | |
| Louise Falls | | Hay River | 15 m (49 ft) | 183 m (600 ft) | Vertical Block | 60°30′10″N 116°14′34″W | |
| Marengo Falls | | Marengo Creek | 30 m (98 ft) | ? | Veiling Horsetail | 61°35′39″N 125°48′08″W | |
| Virginia Falls | | South Nahanni River | 90 m (300 ft) | 305 m (1,001 ft) | Segmented Horsetails | 61°36′27″N 125°44′20″W | |

=== Nunavut ===
| Waterfall | Image | Watercourse | Drop | Width | Type | Coordinates | Ref |
|---|---|---|---|---|---|---|---|
| Barrow Falls | | Barrow River | 27 m (89 ft) | | | 67°19′17″N 81°22′30″W | |
| Kattimannap Qurlua | | Hood River | 49 m (161 ft) | ? | Segmented Plunges | 67°05′43″N 108°47′51″W | |
| Kazan Falls | | Kazan River | 25 m (82 ft) | | | 63°42′51″N 95°50′48″W | |
| Kingaunmiut Falls | | Hood River | 25 m (82 ft) | | Steep cascade | 66°51′26″N 110°44′30″W | |

=== Ontario ===
| Image | Waterfall | Watercourse | Drop | Width | Class | Type | Reference | Coordinates |
|---|---|---|---|---|---|---|---|---|
| | Niagara Falls | Niagara River | 53 m (174 ft) | 671 m (2,201 ft) | | Segmented Block | | 43.077305°N 79.07562°W |
| | Horseshoe Falls | Niagara River | 52 m (171 ft) | | | Segmented Block | | 43.080°N 79.071°W |
| | Big Beaver Falls | Kapuskasing River | 18 m (59 ft) | | | | | |
| | Bridal Veil Falls | Kagawong River | 11 m (36 ft) | | | Plunge | | 45.90048°N 82.25651°W |
| | Bridal Veil Falls | Agawa River | 69 m (226 ft) | | | | | |
| | Chats Falls | Ottawa River | 16 m (52 ft) | | | | | 45°28′35″N 76°14′55″W |
| | Chaudière Falls | Ottawa River | 15 m (49 ft) | 60 m (200 ft) | | | | 45°25′14″N 75°43′20″W |
| | Fenelon Falls, Ontario | Trent-Severn Waterway | 15 m (49 ft) | 7 m (23 ft) 30 m (98 ft) | | Plunge | | 44°32′08″N 78°44′13″W |
| | Fourth Falls | Larder River | | | | | | 47.885°N 79.7772222°W |
| | Helen Falls | Lady Evelyn River | 25 m (82 ft) | | | Cascade | | 47°17′31″N 80°20′02″W |
| | Hog's Back Falls | Rideau River | 18 m (59 ft) | | | artificially created | | 45.371021°N 75.697024°W |
| | Inglis Falls | Sydenham River | 18 m (59 ft) | | | cascade | | 44.525701°N 80.93482°W |
| | Kakabeka Falls | Kaministiquia River | 40 m (130 ft) | | | Plunge | | 48.4029°N 89.6256°W |
| | Onaping Falls | Onaping River | | | | Cascade | | |
| | Rideau Falls | Rideau River | | | | | | 45.441405°N 75.69623°W |
| | Rideau Chutes | Rideau River | | | | | | 47°27′N 75°42′W |
| | Albion Falls | Red Hill Creek | 19 m (62 ft) | 18 m (59 ft) | | classical/cascade | | 43.200472°N 79.819676°W |
| | Ancaster Heights Falls | Tiffany tributary | 13.4 m (44 ft) | 1.8 m (5.9 ft) | | high terraced ribbon cascade | | |
| | Betzner Falls | Spring tributary | 6.3 m (21 ft) | 9 m (30 ft) | | Twin Classic Cascade | | |
| | Billy Green Falls | Battlefield Creek | 17 m (56 ft) | 6 m (20 ft) | | Ribbon | | 43.207160°N 79.766355°W |
| | Borer's Falls | Borer's Creek | 15 m (49 ft) | | | high ribbon-style | | 43°16′52.33″N 79°55′51.71″W |
| | Dog Falls | Kaministiquia River | 47 m (154 ft) | | | | | |
| | Wawaitin Falls | Mattagami River | 38 m (125 ft) | | | | | |
| | White's Falls | Six Mile Lake | 38 m (125 ft) | | | | | |
| | Aubrey Falls | Mississagi River | 33 m (108 ft) | | | | | |
| | Pigeon Falls | Pigeon River | 27 m (89 ft) | | | | | |
| | High Falls | Onaping River | 24 m (79 ft) | | | | | |
| | Schist Falls | Pukaskwa River | 24 m (79 ft) | | | | | |
| | Smoky Falls | Mattagami River | 24 m (79 ft) | | | | | |
| | Christopher Falls | Opasatika River | 23 m (75 ft) | | | | | |
| | Partridge Falls | Pigeon River | 21 m (69 ft) | | | | | |
| | Steephill Falls | Magpie River | 21 m (69 ft) | | | | | |
| | Boundary Falls | Grindstone Tributaries | 6 m (20 ft) | 2 m (6.6 ft) | | high ribbon-style | | |
| | Webster's Falls | Spencer Creek | 22 m (72 ft) | 30 m (98 ft) | | Curtain/Plunge | | 43.276241°N 79.980898°W |

=== Quebec ===
| Waterfall | Image | Watercourse | Drop | Width | Type | Coordinates | Ref |
|---|---|---|---|---|---|---|---|
| Brador Falls | | Brador River | | | | 51°30′25″N 57°14′52″W | |
| Chats Falls | | Ottawa River | 11 m (36 ft) | | | 45°28′35″N 76°14′55″W | |
| Chaudière Falls | | Chaudière River | 35 m (115 ft) | 240 m (790 ft) | | 46°42′47″N 71°17′10″W | |
| Chaudière Falls | | Ottawa River | 15 m (49 ft) | 60 m (200 ft) | | 45°25′14″N 75°43′20″W | |
| Granite Falls | | Caniapiscau River | 21 m (69 ft) | | | 55°50′38″N 68°25′22″W | |
| Kabir Kouba | | Saint-Charles River | 28 m (92 ft) | | | 46°51′19″N 71°21′20″W | |
| Kempt Falls | | Kempt River | | | | 48°01′42″N 66°47′16″W | |
| Limestone Falls | | Caniapiscau River | 22 m (72 ft) | | 335 m (1,099 ft) | 57°28′53″N 69°18′35″W | |
| Monte-à-Peine Falls | Image | Assumption River | | | | 46°12′11″N 73°33′28″W | |
| Montmorency Falls | | Montmorency River | 84 m (276 ft) | | | 46°53′27″N 71°8′51″W | |
| Neigette Falls | | Neigette River | | | | 48°26′14″N 68°18′59″W | |
| Ouiatchouan Falls | | Ouiatchouan River | 79 m (259 ft) | | | 48°25′56″N 72°10′06″W | |
| Pico Falls | | Gilmour Creek | | | | 48°01′36″N 66°57′21″W | |
| Saint Anne Falls | | Sainte-Anne River | 70 m (230 ft) | | | 47°04′23″N 70°52′39″W | |
| Shale Falls | | Caniapiscau River | 18 m (59 ft) | | | 56°44′39″N 69°01′05″W | |
| Shawinigan Falls | | Saint-Maurice River | 46 m (151 ft) | | | 46°31′51″N 72°45′40″W | |
| Vauréal Falls | | Vauréal River | | | | 49°33′37″N 62°41′35″W | |

=== Saskatchewan ===
| Waterfall | Image | Watercourse | Height | Width | Type | Coordinates | Ref |
|---|---|---|---|---|---|---|---|
| Elizabeth Falls | | Fond du Lac River | 34 m (112 ft) | | | 59°10′48″N 105°33′24″W | |
| Coghlan Falls | | Johnson River | 28 m (92 ft) | | Cascading | 57°14′06″N 104°17′38″W | |
| Hunt Falls (Lefty's Falls) | | Grease River | 15 m (49 ft) | 60 m (200 ft) | | 59°28′40″N 106°25′35″W | |
| Kettle Falls | | Churchill River | 5 m (16 ft) | 134 m (440 ft) | | 55°32′54″N 103°14′26″W | |
| Nistowiak Falls | | Rapid River | 10 m (33 ft) | | Segmented | 55°23′46″N 104°21′59″W | |
| Spruce Falls | | Swan River | | | | 55°37′N 102°27′W | |

=== Yukon ===
| Waterfall | Image | Watercourse | Height | Width | Type | Coordinates | Ref |
|---|---|---|---|---|---|---|---|
| Otter Falls | | Aishihik River | | | | 61°04′54″N 136°59′42″W | |
| Rancheria Falls | | Rancheria River | 8 m (26 ft) | | Cascade | 60°04′40″N 130°49′43″W | |

== See also ==
- List of waterfalls
