= List of waterfalls by flow rate =

This list of waterfalls by flow rate includes all waterfalls which are known to have an average flow rate or discharge of at least 150 cubic metres per second (5,300 cu ft/s). The waterfalls in this list are those for which there is verifiable information, and the list should not be assumed to be a complete list of waterfalls which would otherwise qualify as globally significant based on this metric.

== Largest extant waterfalls ==
Waterfall	Image	Flow rate		Drop		Width		River	Countries	Coordinates	Notes
Waterfall	Image	m^{3}/s	cu ft/s	m	ft	m	ft	River	Countries	Coordinates	Notes
Inga Falls		25,768	910,000 (est.)	21	69	914	2,999	Congo	DRC	5°26′56″S 13°35′18″E	The Inga falls, whose status as a true waterfall is controversial, are currently incorporated into the Inga I and Inga II hydroelectric facilities. The volume of the river diverted is approximately 30% of the average discharge. The Grand Inga Dam, potentially the world's largest by generating capacity, is also proposed to be built on the falls.
Livingstone Falls		25,060	885,000	6	20	701	2,300	Congo	DRC; Congo	4°52′41″S 14°26′08″E	A set of rapids that drops 6 metres (20 ft). Located at the southern end of the Republic of the Congo's border with the Congo River.
Boyoma Falls		16,990	600,000	5	16	1,372	4,501	Lualaba, Congo	DRC	0°29′27″N 25°12′24″E	A series of seven cataracts, also referred to as the Stanley Falls. The last and most significant of these cataracts, at Kisangani, is known as Wagenia. The Boyoma Falls marks the transition to the Congo River from the Lualaba River.
Khone Phapheng Falls		11,610	410,000	21	69	10,783	35,377	Mekong	Laos	13°57′18″N 105°54′10″E	A series of falls and rapids that when measured end-to-end is over 10 kilometres in width, making it the world's widest waterfall. Largest waterfall in Asia by average flow rate.
Pará Falls		3,540	125,000	64	210	5,608	18,399	Caura	Venezuela	6°19′01″N 64°30′33″W	Largest extant waterfall in South America by average flow rate.
Paulo Afonso Falls		2,832	100,000	59	194	18	59	São Francisco	Brazil	9°23′21″S 38°11′45″W	Flow regulated by the Paulo Afonso Hydroelectric Complex.
Niagara Falls		2,407	85,000	51	167	1,204	3,950	Niagara	Canada; United States	43°04′48″N 79°04′16″W	Largest extant waterfall in North America by average flow rate. Flow regulated by the Robert Moses Niagara and Sir Adam Beck Hydroelectric Generating Stations.
Vermilion Falls		1,812	64,000	5	16	1,829	6,001	Peace	Canada	58°22′11″N 114°52′18″W	
Iguazú Falls		1,746	61,700	64	210	2,682	8,799	Iguazú	Argentina; Brazil	25°41′43″S 54°26′12″W	
Limestone Falls		1,464	51,700	22	72	335	1,099	Caniapiscau	Canada	57°28′45″N 69°18′36″W	Flow regulated by the KA-3 Dam of the Caniapiscau Reservoir.
Pyrite Falls		1,464	51,700	8	26	579	1,900	Caniapiscau	Canada	57°26′00″N 69°14′32″W	Flow regulated by the KA-3 Dam of the Caniapiscau Reservoir.
Victoria Falls		1,088	38,400	105	344	1,707	5,600	Zambezi	Zambia; Zimbabwe	17°55′27″S 25°51′22″E	Produces the largest sheet of falling water in the world.
Virginia Falls		1,000	35,000	90	300	259	850	South Nahanni	Canada	61°36′27″N 125°44′20″W	
Ngonye Falls		963	34,000	25	82	?	?	Zambezi	Zambia	16°39′08″S 23°34′17″E	Also known as Sioma Falls.
Shale Falls		934	33,000	18	59	610	2,000	Caniapiscau	Canada	56°44′39″N 69°01′04″W	Flow regulated by the KA-3 Dam of the Caniapiscau Reservoir.
Shivanasamudra Falls		934	33,000	98	322	305	1,001	Kaveri	India	12°17′33″N 77°10′03″E	This waterfall divides around Sivasamudram Island. One side is known as Gaganachukki and the other side is known as Barachukki.
Willamette Falls		928	32,800	13	43	457	1,499	Willamette	United States	45°21′05″N 122°37′09″W	Prior to the development of the Oregon City area, it is thought the falls may have spanned as much as 762 metres across. Flow regulated by the T. W. Sullivan Hydroelectric Plant.
Kongou Falls		900	32,000	56	184	3,200	10,500	Ivindo	Gabon	0°17′17″N 12°35′17″E	
Kootenai Falls		731	25,800	9	30	258	846	Kootenay	United States	48°27′20″N 115°45′48″W	
Laksforsen		700	25,000	17	56	?	?	Vefsna	Norway	65°37′25″N 13°17′26″E	
Oatmeal Rapids		697	24,600	?	?	?	?	Rupert River	Canada	51°21′24″N 77°25′11″W	Despite being nominally rapids, the falls are steep enough as to not meet the technical definition due to the final drop.
Kaieteur Falls		663	23,400	226	741	113	371	Potaro	Guyana	5°10′30″N 59°28′50″W	
Rheinfall		595	21,000	24	79	122	400	Rhine	Switzerland	47°40′40″N 8°36′56″E	Largest waterfall in Europe by average flow rate.
Sarp Falls		577	20,400	21	69	?	?	Glomma	Norway	59°16′34″N 11°07′51″E	Second-largest waterfall in Europe by average flow rate.
Kalandula Falls		566	20,000	105	344	411	1,348	Lucala	Angola	9°04′26″S 16°00′03″E	
Chutes de Shawinigan		513	18,100	50	160	?	?	Saint-Maurice	Canada	46.531360°N 72.761830°W	Flow regulated by the Shawinigan 2 and Shawinigan 3 dams.
Chaudière Falls		500	18,000	35	115	240	790	Chaudière	Canada	46°42′47″N 71°17′10″W	Flow regulated by the Sartigan Dam.
Great Falls		474	16,700 (est.)	?	?	107	351	Potomac	United States	38°59′51″N 77°15′09″W	Flow regulated by the Washington Aqueduct.
Kazan Falls		459	16,200	?	?	?	?	Kazan River	Canada	63°42′50″N 95°50′41″W	
Granite Falls		453	16,000	21	69	?	?	Caniapiscau	Canada	55°50′42″N 68°25′25″W	Flow regulated by the KA-3 Dam of the Caniapiscau Reservoir.
Chutes de la Lobé		390	14,000	?	?	?	?	Lobé River	Cameroon	2°52′56″N 9°53′49″E	
Hidden Falls		425	15,000	30	98	?	?	Yarlung Tsangpo	China	29°46′34″N 95°10′54″E	
Ulaan Tsutgalan Waterfall		380	13,000	10	33	24	79	Orkhon River	Mongolia	50°15′00″N 106°08′20″E	The flow rate heavily altered by mining operations.
Saint Anthony Falls		370	13,000	15	49	?	?	Mississippi River	US	44°58′54″N 93°15′31″W	Shape and flow rate severely altered by large hydroelectric developments.
Urriðafoss		360	13,000	4	13	229	751	Þjórsá	Iceland	63°55′30″N 20°40′22″W	
Little Eaton Canyon Falls		317	11,200	?	?	?	?	Caniapiscau	Canada	55°31′46″N 68°17′40″W	Flow regulated by the KA-3 Dam of the Caniapiscau Reservoir.
Lower Eaton Canyon Falls		317	11,200	?	?	?	?	Caniapiscau	Canada	55°33′46″N 68°11′50″W	Flow regulated by the KA-3 Dam of the Caniapiscau Reservoir.
Nastapoca Falls		317	11,200	35	115	35	115	Nastapoca	Canada	56°54′54″N 76°31′46″W	
Tuktu Falls		317	11,200	?	?	?	?	Caniapiscau	Canada	55°32′36″N 68°14′44″W	Flow regulated by the KA-3 Dam of the Caniapiscau Reservoir.
Twin Falls		317	11,200	48	157	61	200	Nastapoca	Canada	56°53′54″N 76°24′12″W	
Upper Eaton Canyon Falls		317	11,200	?	?	?	?	Caniapiscau	Canada	55°33′29″N 68°12′57″W	Flow regulated by the KA-3 Dam of the Caniapiscau Reservoir.
Augrabies Falls		313	11,100	56	184	24	79	Orange	South Africa	28°35′29″S 20°20′25″E	
Murchison Falls		300	11,000	43	141	15	49	White Nile	Uganda	2°16′43″N 31°41′09″E	Flow regulated by the Karuma Hydroelectric Power Station.
Dhuandhar Falls		294	10,400	30	98	?	?	Narmada River	India	23°07′30″N 79°48′53″E	
Alexandra Falls		282	10,000	32	105	117	384	Hay River	Canada	60°30′02″N 116°16′46″W	
Louise Falls		282	10,000	15	49	183	600	Hay River	Canada	60°30′12″N 116°14′29″W	
Dettifoss		269	9,500	51	167	171	561	Jökulsá á Fjöllum	Iceland	65°48′53″N 16°23′04″W	
Hafragilsfoss		269	9,500	27	89	85	279	Jökulsá á Fjöllum	Iceland	65°49′56″N 16°23′57″W	
Réttarfoss		269	9,500	?	?	?	?	Jökulsá á Fjöllum	Iceland	65°52′47″N 16°26′09″W	
Selfoss		269	9,500	13	43	387	1,270	Jökulsá á Fjöllum	Iceland	65°48′18″N 16°23′12″W	
Kanawha Falls		255	9,000	?	?	?	?	Kanawha River	United States	38.138°N 81.213°W	
Ristafallet		250	8,800	14	46	50	160	Indalsälven	Sweden	63.31256°N 13.350903°E	
Sandstone Falls		222	7,800	4	13	549	1,801	New River	United States	37°45′24″N 80°54′21″W	
Huka Falls		220	7,800	11	36	?	?	Waikato River	New Zealand	38°38′55″S 176°05′24″E	
Félou Falls		216	7,600	13	43	?	?	Senegal River	Mali	14°21′13″N 11°20′43″W	Flow regulated by the Félou Hydroelectric Plant.
Gouina Falls		216	7,600	16	52	500	1,600	Senegal River	Mali	14°00′54″N 11°06′09″W	Flow regulated by the Gouina Hydroelectric Plant.
Big Falls		213	7,500	27	89	183	600	Missouri River	United States	47°34′08″N 111°07′26″W	Flow regulated by the Ryan Dam.
Black Eagle Falls		213	7,500	8	26	183	600	Missouri River	United States	47°31′11″N 111°15′44″W	Flow regulated by the Black Eagle Dam.
Crooked Falls		213	7,500	6	20	457	1,499	Missouri River	United States	47°32′06″N 111°11′47″W	Flow regulated by the Rainbow Dam.
Rainbow Falls		213	7,500	13	43	305	1,001	Missouri River	United States	47°32′00″N 111°12′19″W	Flow regulated by the Rainbow Dam.
Rusumo Falls		210	7,400	15	49	40	130	Kagera River	Rwanda Tanzania	2°22′57″S 30°47′00″W	
Målselvfossen		196	6,900	22	72	600	2,000	Målselva	Norway	69°02′09″N 18°39′16″E	
Storforsen		187	6,600	35	115	76	249	Pite River	Sweden	65°50′59″N 20°24′16″E	
Kabwelume Falls		181	6,400	?	?	?	?	Kalungwishi River	Zambia	9°31′29″S 29°21′05″E	
Lumangwe Falls		181	6,400	?	?	?	?	Kalungwishi River	Zambia	9°32′32″S 29°23′11″E	
Zongo Falls		179	6,300	?	?	?	?	Inkisi River	DRC	4.777431°S 14.905735°E	Flow regulated by the Zongo II Hydroelectric Power Station.
Rearguard Falls		171	6,000	6	20	61	200	Fraser River	Canada	52°58′24″N 119°21′51″W	
Cohoes Falls		161	5,700	20	66	290	950	Mohawk River	United States	42°47′17″N 73°42′31″W	Flow regulated by the School Street Hydroelectric Generating Facility.
Epupa Falls		160	5,700	37	121	1,500	4,900	Cunene River	Angola Namibia	17°00′00″S 13°14′36″E	Flow regulated by the Ruacana Hydroelectric Power Station.
Ruacana Falls		160	5,700	120	390	700	2,300	Cunene River	Angola Namibia	17°23′38″S 14°13′04″E	Flow regulated by the Ruacana Hydroelectric Power Station.
Jog Falls		153	5,400	253	830	472	1,549	Sharavati River	India	14°13′45″N 74°48′45″E	Flow regulated by the Linganamakki Dam.

== Largest historic waterfalls ==
This list comprises the waterfalls which have ceased to exist due to the impoundment of their river(s) by a dam, or due to the diversion of the watercourse.

Waterfall	Image	Flow rate		Drop		Width		River	Countries	Coordinates	Notes
Waterfall	Image	m^{3}/s	cu ft/s	m	ft	m	ft	River	Countries	Coordinates	Notes
Guaíra Falls		13,309	470,000	40	130	4,828	15,840	Paraná	Brazil; Paraguay	24°04′03″S 54°17′00″W	Submerged beneath the Itaipu Reservoir following the completion of the Itaipu Dam in 1982.
Celilo Falls		5,366	189,500	6	20.1	1,768	5,801	Columbia	United States	45°39′05″N 120°58′10″W	Submerged beneath the Columbia River following the completion of The Dalles Dam in 1957. The rock formation responsible for the falls remains intact.
Kettle Falls		4,682	165,300	?	?	?	?	Columbia	United States	48°37′52″N 118°07′08″W	Submerged beneath Lake Roosevelt following the completion of the Grand Coulee Dam in 1940. The formation responsible for the falls remains intact.
Urubupunga Falls		2,747	97,000	13	43	2,012	6,601	Paraná	Brazil	20°36′S 51°33′W	Submerged beneath the Paraná River following completion of the Engineer Souza Dias Dam in 1982. The formation responsible for the falls remains intact.
Marimbondo Falls		1,501	53,000	24	79	2,012	6,601	Rio Grande	Brazil	20°18′35″S 49°12′06″W	The Marimbondo Dam was built atop the upper portion of the falls in 1971. The section further upstream was submerged beneath the Rio Grande, while the section below the dam was dewatered and are visible.
San Rafael Falls		400	14,000	94	308	23	75	Coca	Ecuador	0°06′15″S 77°34′51″W	On 2 February 2020, a large sinkhole formed just above the falls, diverting its flow beneath a large band of rock (the former brink of the falls) which survived the collapse and became a natural bridge until it too collapsed. Although the river initially still fell over 100 m (330 ft) into the sinkhole, very rapid headward erosion has since left no significant waterfall at this location.
La Chute Grande		400	14,000	19	62	?	?	Romaine	Canada	50°23′14″N 63°15′06″W	Destroyed by the construction of the Romaine-1 Generating Station at the top of the falls.

== Prehistoric waterfalls ==
Waterfall	Flow rate		Drop		Width		River	Countries
Waterfall	m^{3}/s	cu ft/s	m	ft	m	ft	River	Countries
Gibraltar (Zanclean deluge hypothesis)	100,000,000	3.5×10^{9}					Strait of Gibraltar	Spain; Morocco
Dry Falls	1,906,000	67,300,000	120	4,200	4,828	170,500	Columbia	United States
Bosphorus (Black Sea deluge hypothesis)	480,000	17,000,000	80	260			Bosphorus Strait	Turkey

== See also ==
- Waterfall
- List of rivers by discharge
- List of waterfalls
- List of waterfalls by height
- List of waterfalls by type
- Orders of magnitude (power)
