= Cerberus Falls =

Tiered waterfalls in Columbia-Shuswap Regional District, British Columbia, Canada

- Interactive map of Cerberus Falls
- Location: Columbia-Shuswap, British Columbia, Canada
- Coordinates: 51°53′39″N 117°04′19″W
- Type: Segmented horsetails
- Elevation: 1,814 m (5,951 ft)
- Total height: 475 m (1,558 ft)
- Number of drops: 1
- Longest drop: 475 m (1,558 ft)
- Total width: 198 m (650 ft)
- Average width: 122 m (400 ft)
- Run: 213 m (699 ft)
- Watercourse: Icefall Brook
- Average flow rate: 14 m^{3}/s (490 cu ft/s)
- World height ranking: 140th (overall); 26th (tallest single drop)

Cerberus Falls is a segmented horsetail waterfall located at the head of Icefall Canyon in the Continental Ranges of British Columbia, Canada. With a total height of 475 m (1,558 ft), the falls are tied with Kiwi Falls on Vancouver Island as the 8th tallest confirmed waterfall in Canada. It is also the tallest waterfall in Canada by tallest single drop and the 26th tallest waterfall in the world by tallest single drop.

== Structure ==
Cerberus Falls forms as Icefall Brook emerges from the Southwest Lyell Glaciers and cascade over the edge of a glacially scoured trough. The falls form two to four distinct segments depending on seasonal melt. During high flow, three of the four segments appear grouped close together while the fourth appears further to the southwest.

The southernmost segment plunges in three massive steps. The middle segment skips down the cliff in one long horsetail. The northernmost segment plunges down into a narrow slot canyon before reemerging as a veiling horsetail near the base of the cliff.

== See also ==
- List of waterfalls
- List of waterfalls in British Columbia
- James Bruce Falls
