= Madden Falls =

Waterfall on Madden Creek in Tantalus Provincial Park, British Columbia, Canada

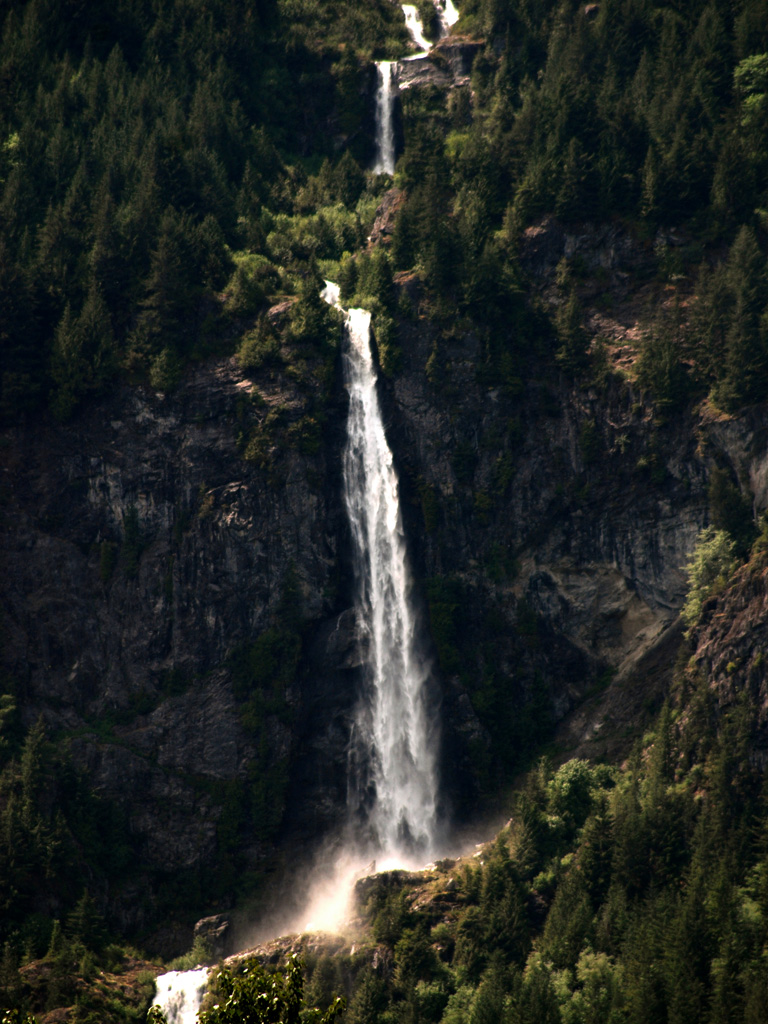
- The tallest single drop of Madden Falls
- Interactive map of Madden Falls
- Location: Tantalus Provincial Park, British Columbia, Canada
- Coordinates: 49°53′20″N 123°19′01″W
- Type: Tiered horsetails
- Total height: 579 m (1,900 ft)
- Number of drops: 9
- Longest drop: 152 m (499 ft)
- Total width: 15 m (49 ft)
- Average width: 8 m (26 ft)
- Run: 914 m (2,999 ft)
- Watercourse: Madden Creek
- Average flow rate: 1 m^{3}/s (35 cu ft/s)
- World height ranking: 82nd

Madden Falls is a tiered horsetail waterfall located in the Pacific Ranges of British Columbia, Canada. With a total height of 579 m (1,900 ft), the falls are the 2nd tallest waterfall in Canada.

== Structure ==
Madden Falls forms as Madden Creek emerges from the northeastern flank of Pelion Mountain and cascades down an especially steep section of the mountain in nine steps. The longest step, measuring 152 m (499 ft) tall, is the 13th tallest single drop of any confirmed waterfall in Canada.

Most of the falls are easily observable from across the Squamish Valley.

== See also ==
- James Bruce Falls
- List of waterfalls
- List of waterfalls in British Columbia
