= Panther Falls =

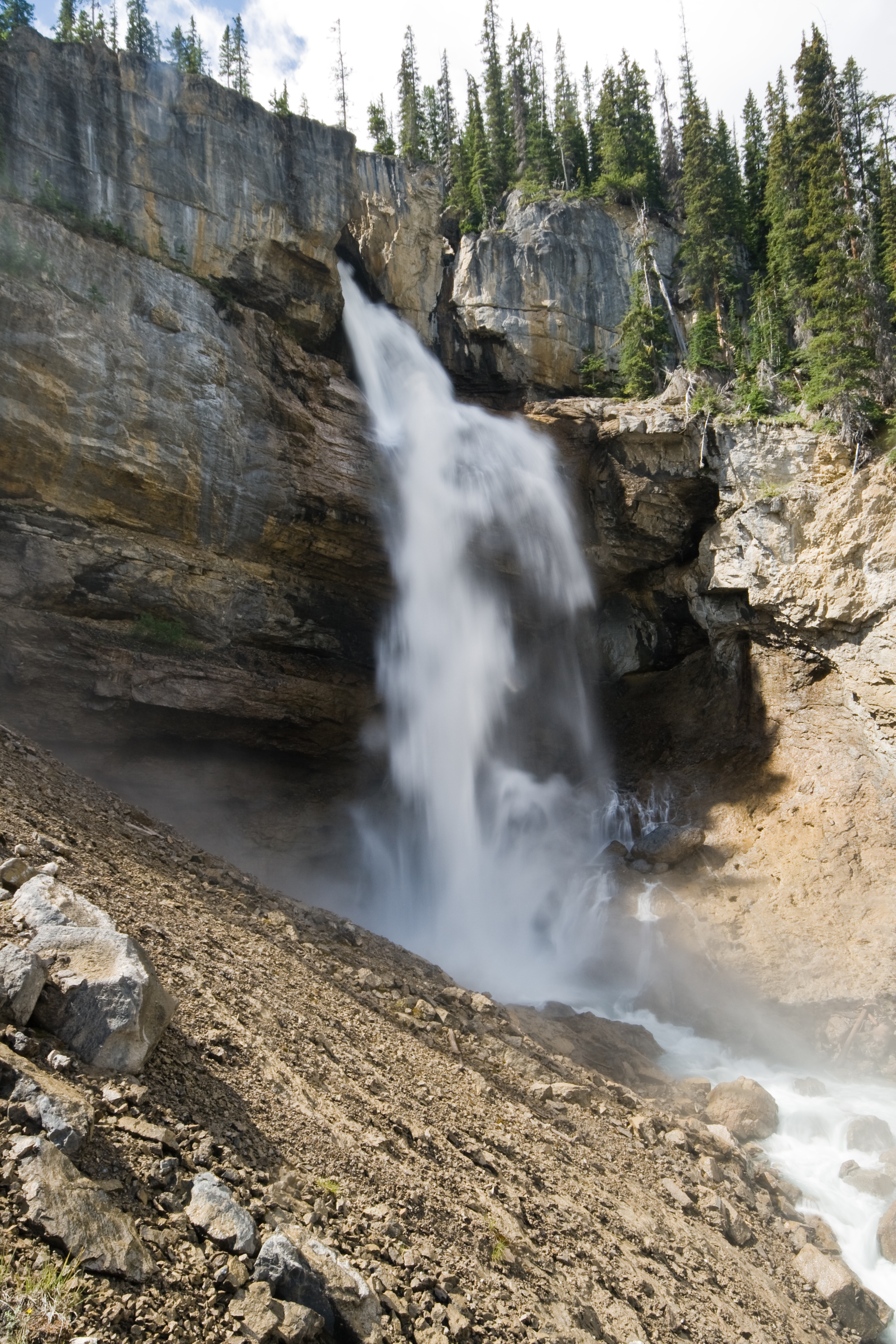
- Panther Falls, close to the Icefields Parkway

- Location within Alberta
- Location: Banff National Park, Alberta, Canada
- Coordinates: 52°10′54″N 117°03′23″W
- Type: Veiling Plunge
- Total height: 66 metres (217 ft)
- Number of drops: 1
- Total width: 20 metres (66 ft)
- Average width: 12 metres (39 ft)
- Run: 18 metres (59 ft)
- Watercourse: Nigel Creek
- Average flow rate: 2 m^{3}/s (71 cu ft/s)

Panther Falls are a series of waterfalls in Banff National Park, Alberta, Canada. It is developed on Nigel Creek and its waters originate in Nigel Pass, between the slopes of Cirrus Mountain and Nigel Peak in the Parker Ridge of the Canadian Rockies.

It is a class 3 waterfall, with a drop of 66 m (217 ft) and a width of 20 m (66 ft).

== See also ==
- List of waterfalls
- List of waterfalls of Canada
