= Ed Kea =

Netherlands-born Canadian ice hockey player (1948–1999)

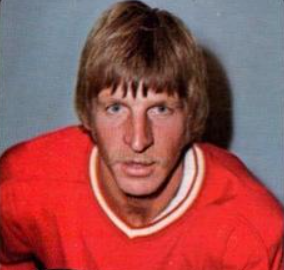
- Kea in 1975 card
- Born: January 19, 1948 Weesp, Netherlands
- Died: August 31, 1999 (aged 51) Six Mile Lake, Ontario, Canada
- Height: 6 ft 3 in (191 cm)
- Weight: 190 lb (86 kg; 13 st 8 lb)
- Position: Defence
- Shot: Left
- Played for: Atlanta Flames; St. Louis Blues
- Playing career: 1969–1983

Adriaan Jozef Kea (January 19, 1948 – August 31, 1999) was a Dutch-born Canadian ice hockey defenceman. He played in the National Hockey League (NHL) with the Atlanta Flames and St. Louis Blues from 1974 to 1983.

== Playing career ==
Born in Weesp, North Holland, Netherlands, but raised in Collingwood, Ontario (his family moved to Canada when he was four years old), Kea started his National Hockey League career with the Atlanta Flames. He also played with the St. Louis Blues. His career lasted from 1974 to 1983. Kea was the father of stand-up comedian Gabe Kea from Cincinnati, and uncle of Jeff Beukeboom and Joe Nieuwendyk.

=== Injury and retirement ===
Kea was playing for the Salt Lake Golden Eagles, the Blues' Central Hockey League affiliate in Salt Lake City in 1983 when he suffered severe head trauma as he fell and hit his head on the ice during a game. The injury left him physically and mentally disabled. Because he was playing in a minor league game, NHL benefits for catastrophic injuries did not apply to his case, and he and his family struggled financially for several years because he was unable to hold a job.

== Post-playing career and death ==
On September 1, 1999, Kea accidentally drowned at his family's summer home in Six Mile Lake in Ontario. He was 51 years old. In 2012, Dave Bidini claimed in an opinion article for the National Post that Kea committed suicide due to undiagnosed injuries and concussions from his playing career.

== Career statistics ==
=== Regular season and playoffs ===
			Regular season					Playoffs
Season	Team	League	GP	G	A	Pts	PIM	GP	G	A	Pts	PIM
1967–68	Collingwood Legionnaires	OHA-C	—	—	—	—	—	—	—	—	—	—
1967–68	Collingwood Kings	OHA Sr	2	0	1	1	0	—	—	—	—	—
1968–69	Collingwood Legionnaires	OHA-C	—	—	—	—	—	—	—	—	—	—
1968–69	Collingwood Kings	OHA Sr	8	0	1	1	4	—	—	—	—	—
1969–70	Jersey Devils	EHL	52	4	18	22	130	—	—	—	—	—
1970–71	Seattle Totems	WHL	5	0	0	0	2	—	—	—	—	—
1970–71	Jersey Devils	EHL	74	8	26	34	148	—	—	—	—	—
1971–72	St. Petersburg Suns	EHL	63	10	39	49	107	6	2	2	4	20
1972–73	Omaha Knights	CHL	68	10	22	32	145	11	3	3	6	10
1973–74	Atlanta Flames	NHL	3	0	2	2	0	—	—	—	—	—
1973–74	Tulsa Oilers	CHL	51	6	17	23	38	—	—	—	—	—
1974–75	Atlanta Flames	NHL	50	1	9	10	39	—	—	—	—	—
1974–75	Omaha Knights	CHL	21	6	6	12	26	—	—	—	—	—
1975–76	Atlanta Flames	NHL	78	8	19	27	101	2	0	0	0	7
1976–77	Atlanta Flames	NHL	72	4	21	25	63	3	0	1	1	2
1977–78	Atlanta Flames	NHL	60	3	23	26	40	1	0	0	0	0
1978–79	Atlanta Flames	NHL	53	6	18	24	40	2	0	0	0	0
1978–79	Tulsa Oilers	CHL	2	0	3	3	0	—	—	—	—	—
1979–80	St. Louis Blues	NHL	69	3	16	19	79	3	0	0	0	2
1980–81	St. Louis Blues	NHL	74	3	18	21	60	11	1	2	3	12
1981–82	St. Louis Blues	NHL	78	2	14	16	62	10	1	1	2	16
1982–83	St. Louis Blues	NHL	46	0	5	5	24	—	—	—	—	—
1982–83	Salt Lake Golden Eagles	CHL	9	1	4	5	10	—	—	—	—	—
NHL totals			583	30	145	175	508	32	2	4	6	39
