= Schwartzenbach Falls =

- Qulitasaniakvik
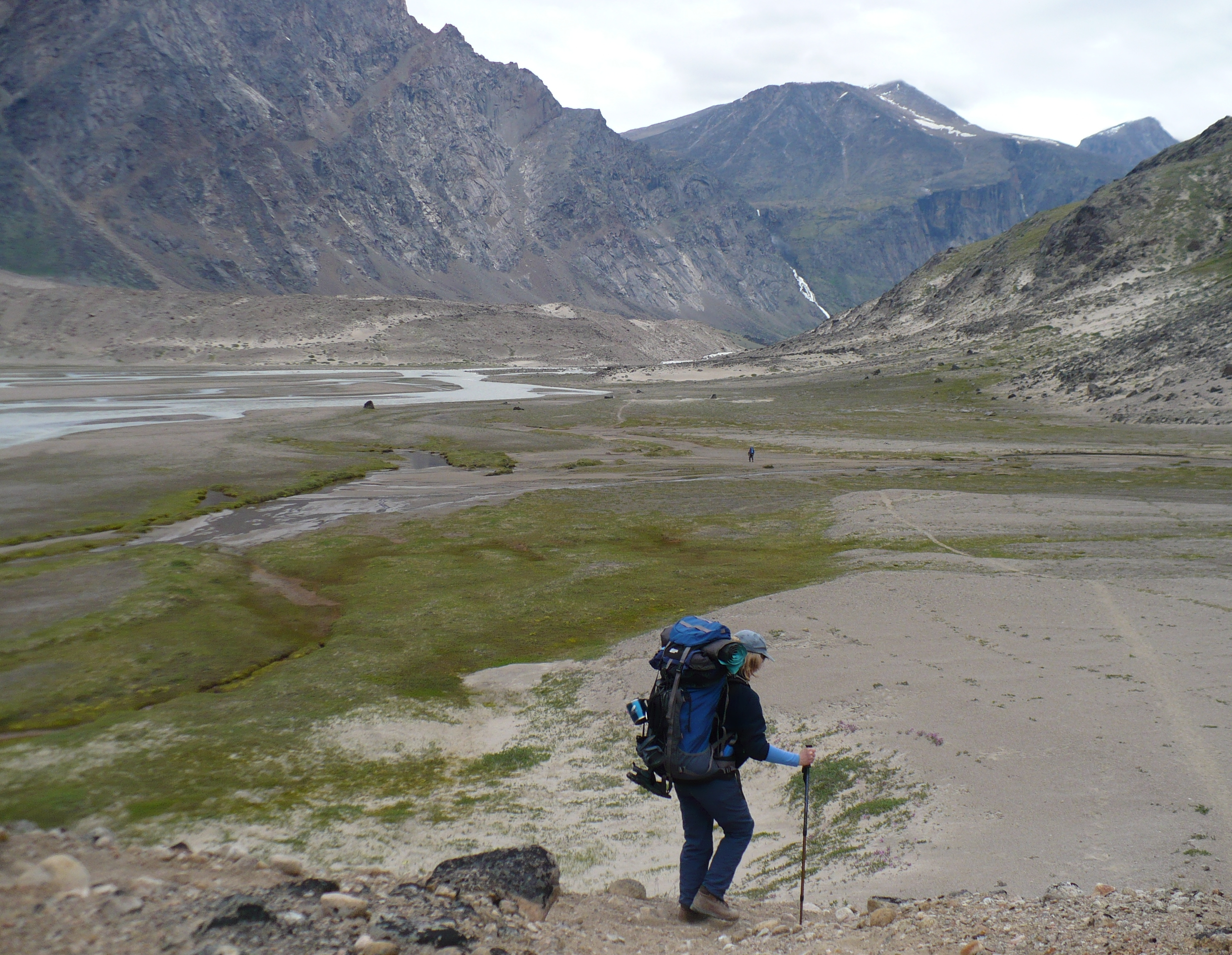
- Weasel River Valley with Schwartzenbach Falls in the distance
- Interactive map of Schwartzenbach Falls
- Location: Auyuittuq National Park, Nunavut, Canada
- Coordinates: 66°30′30″N 65°31′30″W
- Type: Tiered Horsetails
- Elevation: 640 m (2,100 ft)
- Total height: 520 m (1,710 ft)
- Number of drops: 5
- Longest drop: 200 m (660 ft)
- Total width: 30 m (98 ft)
- Average width: 30 m (98 ft)
- Run: 884 m (2,900 ft)
- Watercourse: Unnamed stream
- Average flow rate: 3 m^{3}/s (110 cu ft/s)
- World height ranking: 111th

Schwartzenbach Falls, also known as Qulitasaniakvik, is a tiered horsetail waterfall located in the Weasel River Valley of Baffin Island in Nunavut, Canada. With an overall height of 520 m (1,710 ft), it is the 4th tallest waterfall in Canada and the tallest in Canada outside of British Columbia.

== Name origin ==
The Inuktitut name for the waterfall is Qulitasaniakvik, which means "place to get caribou skins". The name refers to the valley above the falls being a good place to hunt for caribou.

== Structure ==
The falls form from an unnamed stream that plummets 520 m (1,710 ft) down the western wall of the Weasel River Valley. The initial drop leaps 200 m (660 ft) over the edge of an inclined cliff and takes the form of a horsetail. This is followed by a series of four smaller cascades that descend an additional 320 m (1,050 ft) before the cliff gives way to a collection of talus deposits.

== See also ==
- List of waterfalls
- List of waterfalls of Canada
