= White's Falls =

- Interactive map of White's Falls
- Location: Port Severn Ontario, Canada
- Coordinates: 44.8799°N 79.7221°W
- Type: Cataract
- Total height: 20 ft (6.1 m)
- Number of drops: 1
- Watercourse: Six Mile Lake (Ontario)

White's Falls is a waterfall in Gloucester Pool, Ontario. It is located near the town of Port Severn.

The upper portion of White's Falls has been modified by a dam to maintain water levels in Six Mile Lake (Ontario). As such, the flow through the falls is seasonally variable. It is located right off Muskoka Road 34, just a few minutes from Ontario Highway 400. The falls are located along the main road to the Big Chute Marine Railway. White's Falls is named after Joseph Arthur White Sr, who settled in the area in the mid-19th century.

The dam underwent construction in November of 2023, with plans to reopen in early 2025.

== See also ==
- List of waterfalls
- List of waterfalls in Canada
