= Limestone Falls =

Waterfall on the Caniapiscau River in Quebec, Canada

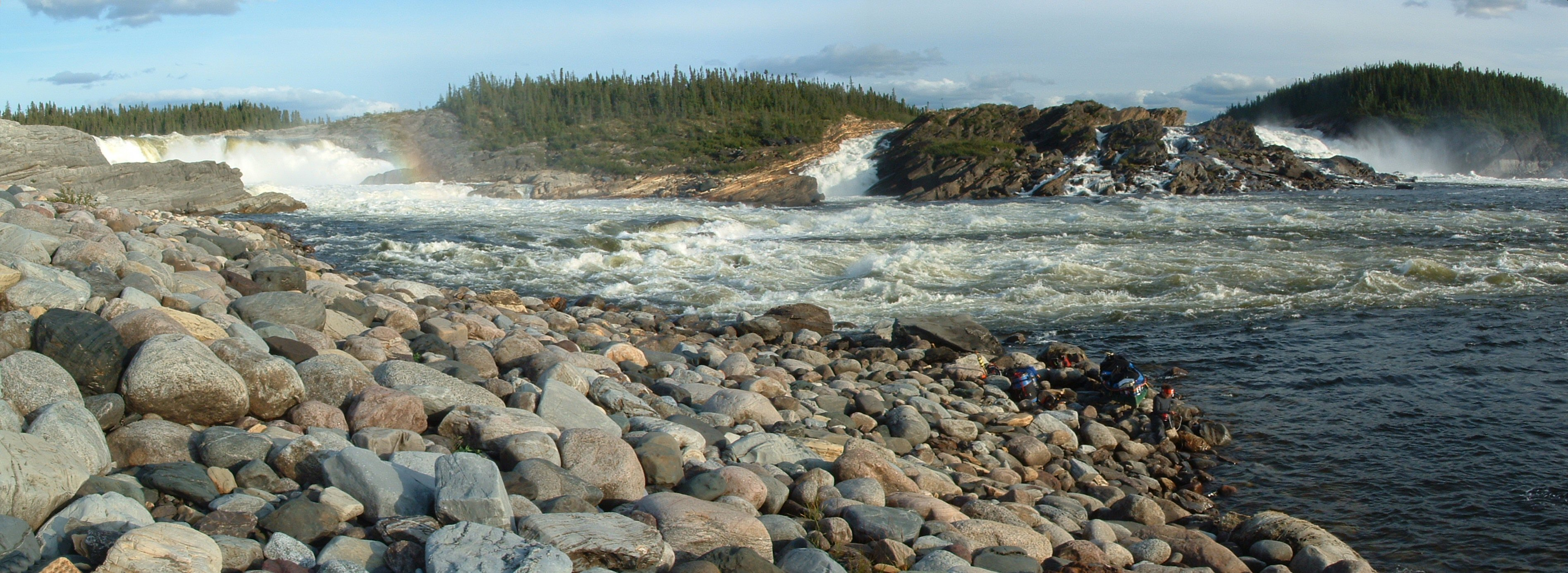
- Limestone Falls
- Interactive map of Limestone Falls
- Location: Nunavik, Quebec, Canada
- Coordinates: 57°28′45″N 69°18′36″W
- Type: Tiered cascades
- Total height: 22 m (72 ft)
- Average width: 335 m (1,099 ft)
- Run: 158 m (518 ft)
- Average flow rate: 1,464 m^{3}/s (51,700 cu ft/s)

Limestone Falls (French: Chute du Calcaire) is series of waterfalls on the Caniapiscau River in Nunavik, Quebec, Canada. The falls are both the largest and tallest of a series of waterfalls on the Caniapiscau River, which includes the smaller but equally powerful Pyrite Falls located about 7 km (4.3 mi) upstream.

The flow of the falls has been regulated by the KA-3 Dam of the Caniapiscau Reservoir since its completion in 1985.

== See also ==
- List of waterfalls
- List of waterfalls by flow rate
- List of waterfalls of Canada
