= Nigel (disambiguation) =

Nigel is an English masculine given name.

Nigel may also refer to:

- 3795 Nigel, an asteroid
- Nigel, a 1979 album by Nigel Olsson
- Nigel (bishop of Ely) (c. 1100–1169)
- Nigel (dog) (born 2008), a male Golden Retriever dog belonging to Monty Don, a British television gardening presenter
- Negel, Kurdistan, also known as Nigel, a village in Kurdistan Province, Iran
- Nigel, Gauteng, a South African town
  - Nigel (House of Assembly of South Africa constituency)
- Nigel Creek, Canada
