= Jordan Creek Falls =

Waterfall in Washington (state), United States

Jordan Creek Falls drops 588 feet (179 m) along Jordan Creek in Skagit County, Washington. The cascade has a run of 250 feet (76 m) and is fed by two large lakes and a large watershed. The falls' elevation is at 3,086 feet (941 m).

== Sources ==
- Waterfalls Northwest

48.4738°N 121.3859°W
