= Bridal Veil Falls (Banff) =

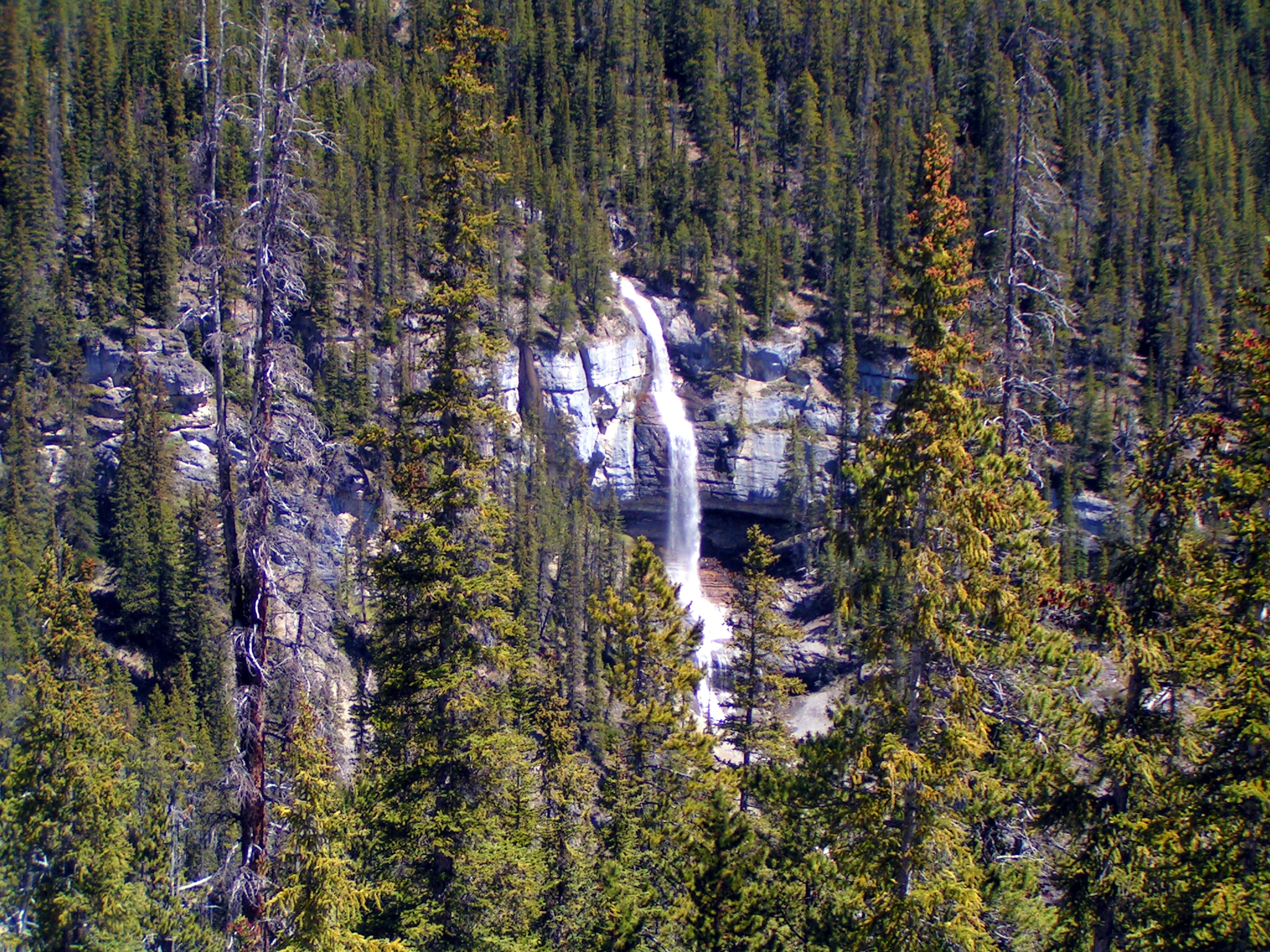
- Bridal Veil Fall seen from the Icefields Parkway

- Location within Alberta
- Location: Banff National Park, Alberta, Canada
- Coordinates: 52.18999°N 117.04685°W
- Type: Horsetail/Plunge
- Elevation: 2,200 m (7,200 ft)
- Total height: 1,200 ft (370 m)
- Longest drop: 400 ft (120 m)
- Total width: 20 ft (6.1 m)
- Watercourse: Nigel Creek

Bridal Veil Fall is a waterfall in Banff National Park, Alberta, Canada. It originates in the Huntington Glacier on the slopes of Cirrus Mountain. Its waters drain into Nigel Creek, then into the North Saskatchewan River at the Big Bend of the Icefields Parkway.

It is a class 4 waterfall, with a drop of 1,200 ft (370 m) and a width of 20 ft (6.1 m). The tallest single drop is 400 ft (120 m).

== See also ==
- List of waterfalls
- List of waterfalls in Canada
