= Ed Lucero =

Ed Lucero is a noted American whitewater kayaker.

He is known for making "first descents", including the former record 105 foot (32 M) Alexandra Falls in Canada's Northwest Territories, Guadalupe Falls in the Jemez Mountains of New Mexico, and Smith Falls in Idaho. In 1997, Lucero kayaked the Guadalupe River in Jemez Springs, New Mexico.

He suffered broken ribs at Casanova Falls in Ecuador, which led him to produce a specialized rescue vest for niche outfitter Stohlquist.
