= Alexandra Falls =

Waterfall on the Hay River in Northwest Territories, Canada

- Hatto deh Naili
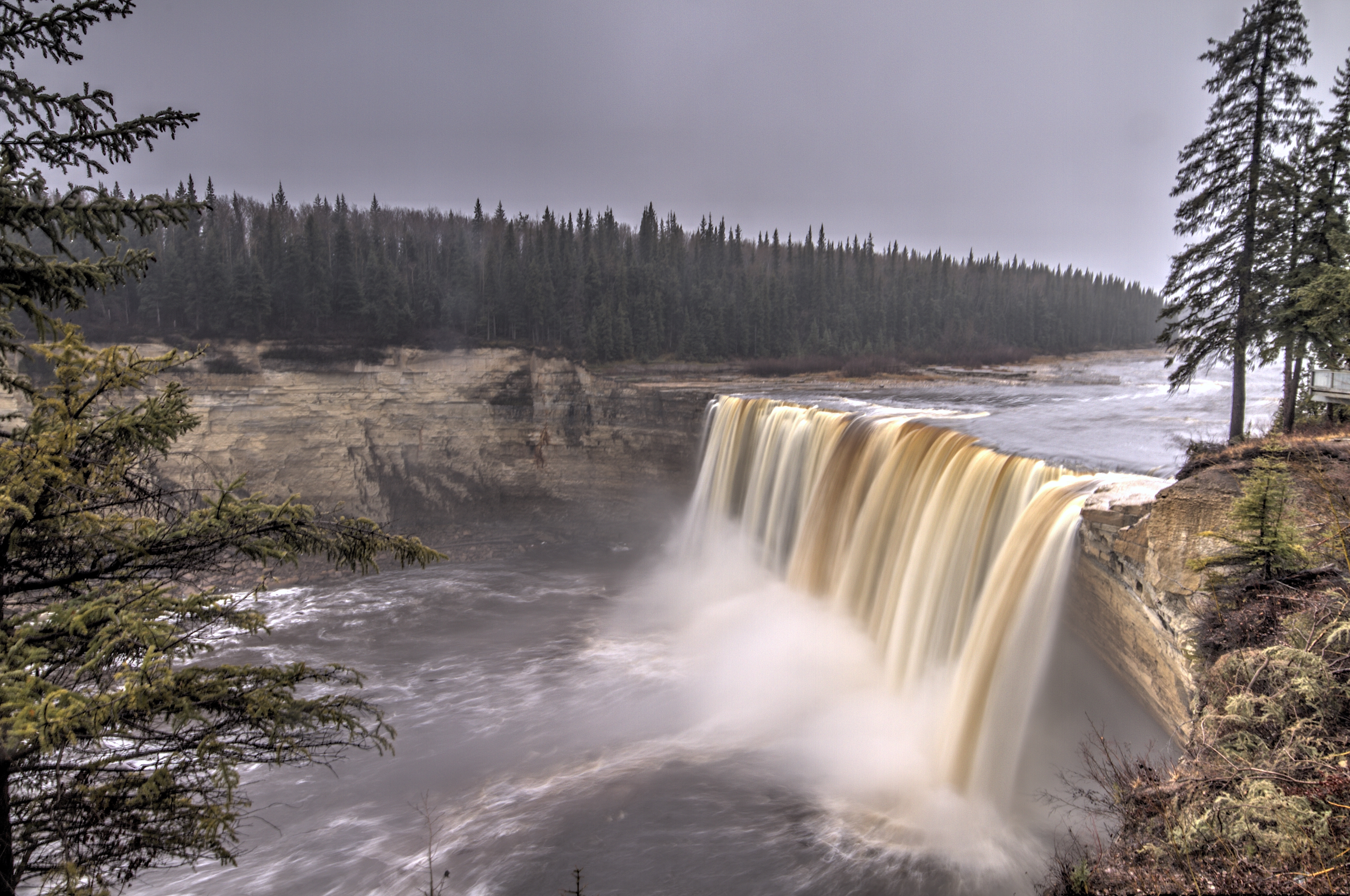
- The falls in January

- Location within Canada
- Location: On the Hay River, Northwest Territories, Canada
- Coordinates: 60°30′02″N 116°16′45″W
- Total height: 32 m (105 ft)

The Alexandra Falls (Slavey: Hatto deh Naili) is a 32 m (105 ft) waterfall located on the Hay River in the Northwest Territories. The falls, the third highest in the NWT, form part of the Twin Falls Gorge Territorial Park and has its own day use area with a 3 km (1.9 mi) trail to the main campsite at Louise Falls (15 m drop), the second of the Twin Falls. Situated on the Mackenzie Highway the falls are about 10 km (6.2 mi) southwest of Enterprise and 43 km (27 mi) southwest of Hay River.

Both Ed Lucero and Tyler Bradt, whitewater kayakers, have successfully gone over the falls in kayaks. Traditional Dene lore says that the two falls are two spirits, Grandmother and Grandfather, who protect the area.

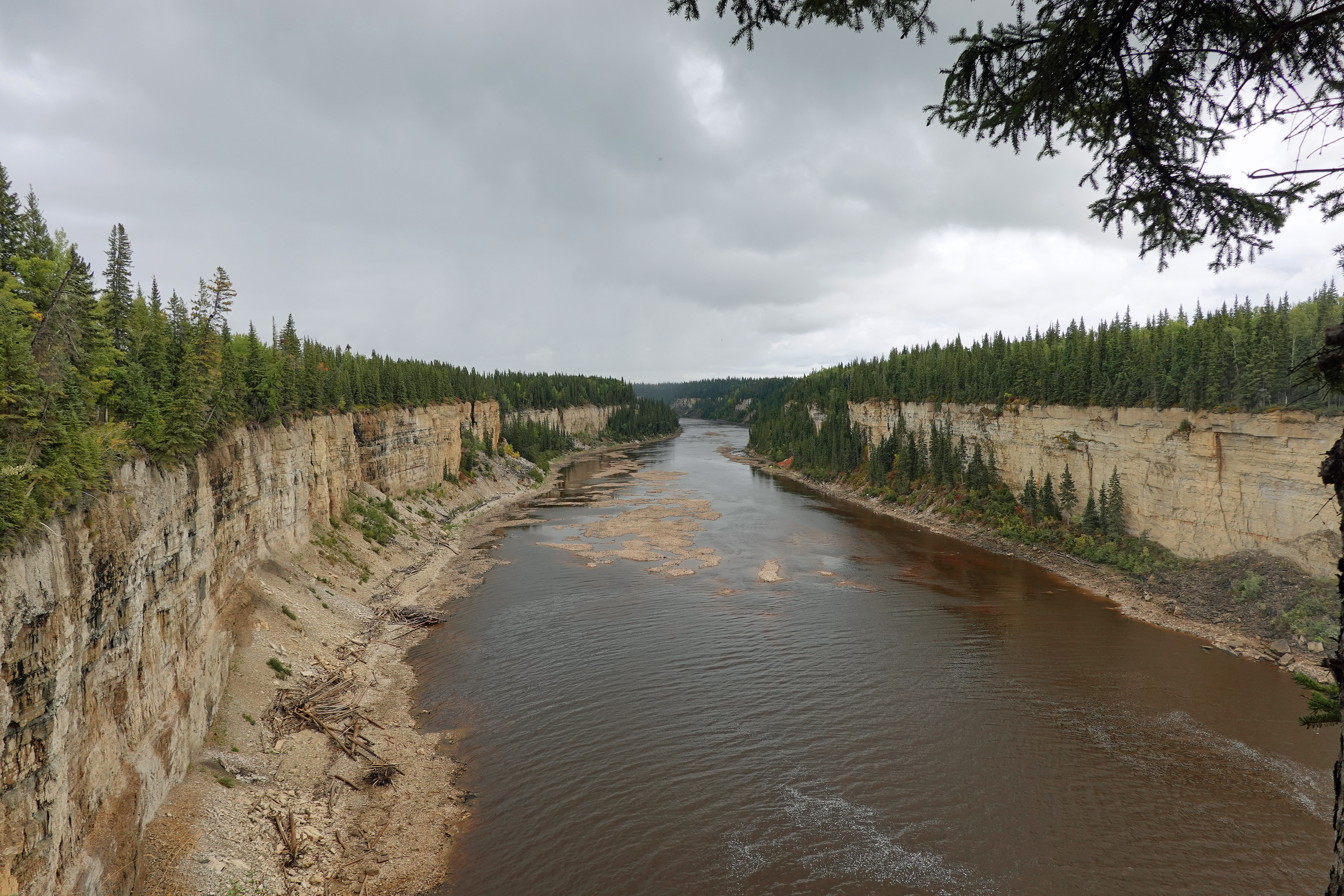
The Hay River immediately downstream of Alexandra Falls

== See also ==
- List of waterfalls
- List of waterfalls of Canada
- List of waterfalls by flow rate
