= Bow Glacier Falls =

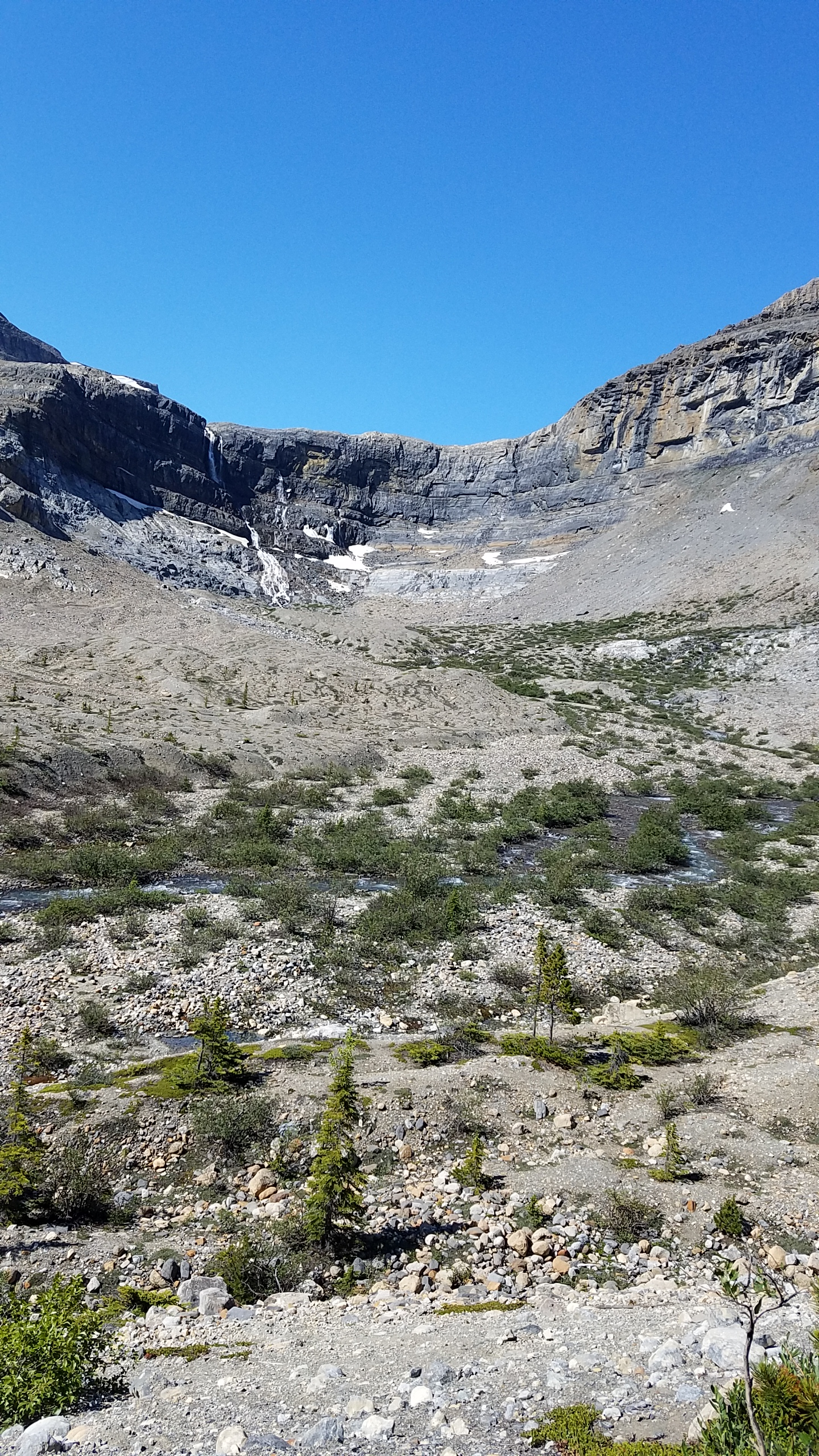
- Interactive map of Bow Glacier Falls
- Coordinates: 51°39′23″N 116°29′48″W
- Type: Tiered
- Total height: 410 feet (120 m)
- Total width: 75 feet (23 m)
- Watercourse: Bow River

Bow Glacier Falls is located near Banff, AB. The falls originates from meltwater from the Bow Glacier and flows into Bow Lake.

== 2025 Rockslide ==
On June 19th, 2025, a rock slide took place, striking a group of hikers. Two people were killed and a further thirteen injured, with two requiring evacuated by STARS air ambulance. The first fatality, Jutta Hinrichs of Calgary, was located shortly after the slide occurred. The second fatality, Hamza Benhilal of Surrey, British Columbia, was recovered from beneath the rubble the following day.

== See also ==
- List of waterfalls
- List of waterfalls of Canada
