= Amber River =

Stream in Alberta, Canada

Coordinates: 58.850°N 118.915°W

Amber River is a stream in Alberta, Canada.

Amber River was so named on account of its amber-coloured water.

== See also ==
- List of rivers of Alberta
