= Tangle Falls =

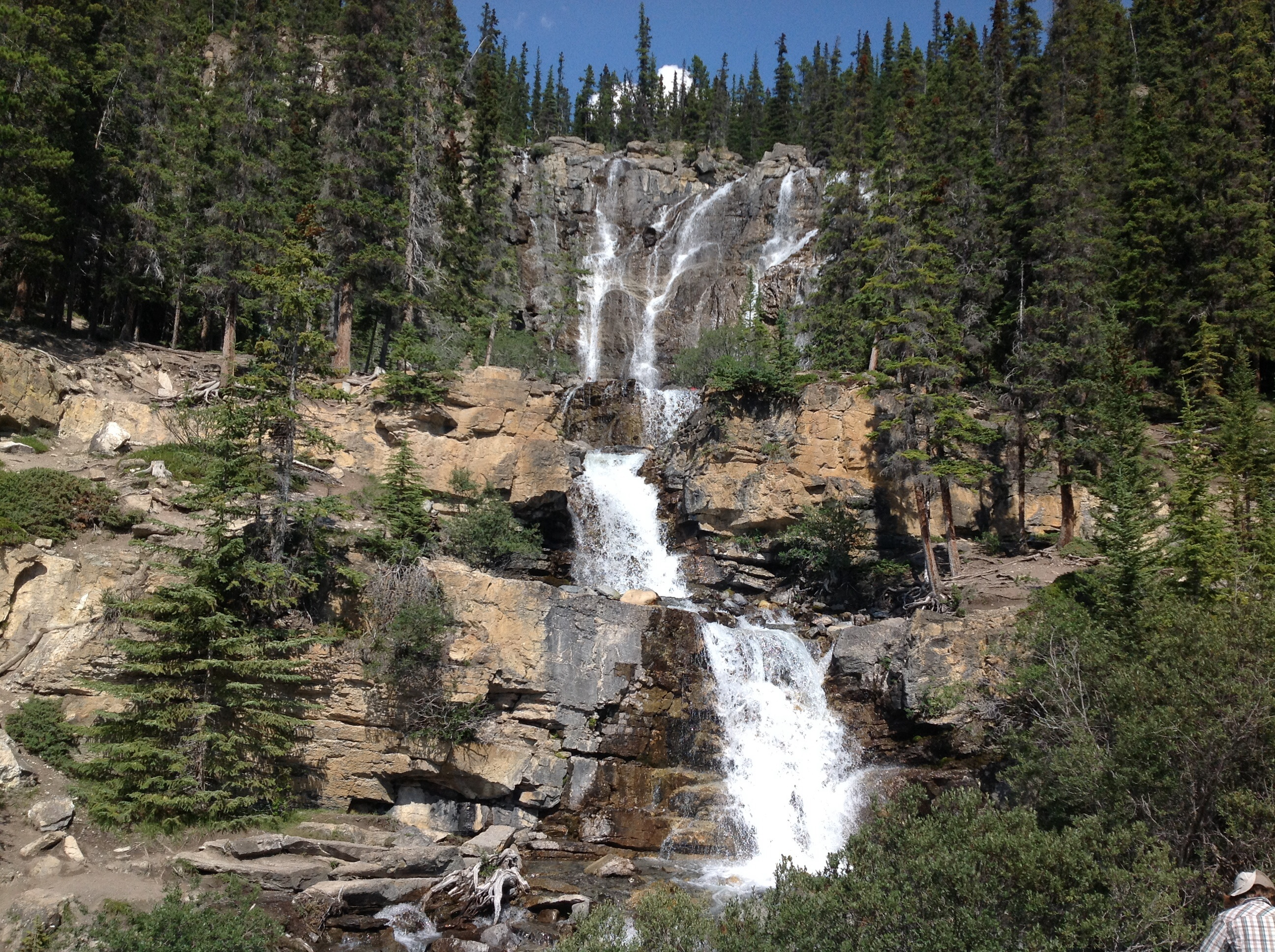
- Interactive map of Tangle Falls
- Coordinates: 52°16′04″N 117°17′08″W
- Type: Tiered Plunges
- Number of drops: 4
- Average width: 5 m (16 ft)

Tangle Falls is a multi-tiered waterfall located in Jasper National Park along Icefields Parkway. It has 4 drops, and is 48 meters tall. Tangle Falls is 30 meters at its widest.

== See also ==
- List of waterfalls
- List of waterfalls in Canada
