= Chaudière Falls (Chaudière River) =

Waterfall in Lévis, Quebec, Canada

- French: Chutes de la Chaudière
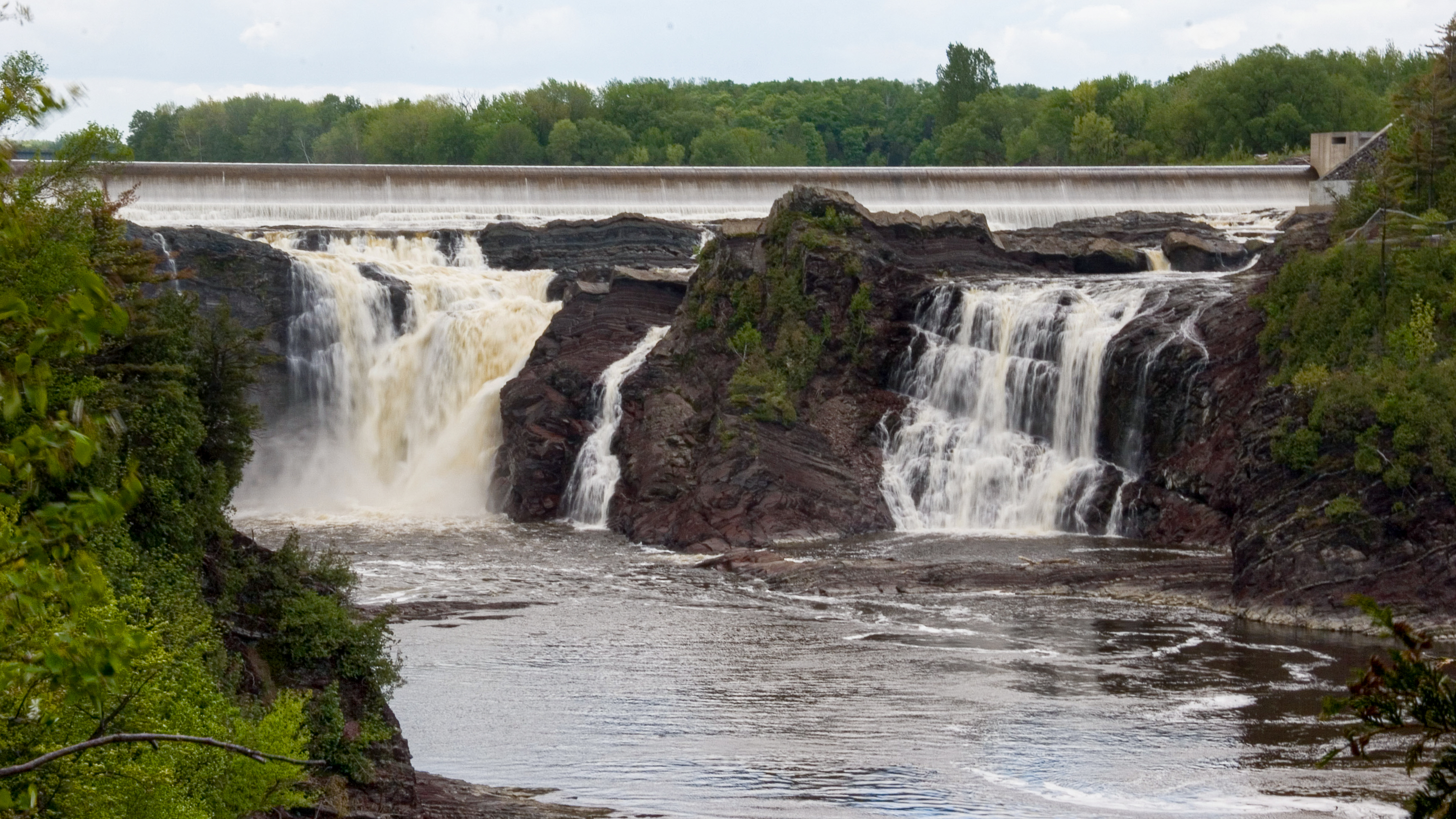
- Interactive map of Chaudière Falls
- Location: Lévis, Quebec
- Coordinates: 46°42′53″N 71°16′57″W
- Type: Segmented block
- Total height: 35 metres (115 ft)
- Total width: 240 m (790 ft)
- Watercourse: Chaudière River
- Average flow rate: 500 m^{3}/s (18,000 cu ft/s)

Chaudière Falls (French: Chutes de la Chaudière, pronounced [ʃyt də la ʃodjɛʁ]) is a 35-meter-high (115 ft) waterfall in Lévis, Quebec, along the Chaudière River. It is part of the regional Parc des Chutes-de-la-Chaudière, which features a 113-metre-long (371 ft) suspension footbridge standing 23 metres over the river. There are walking and bicycle trails along the river.

== Gallery ==
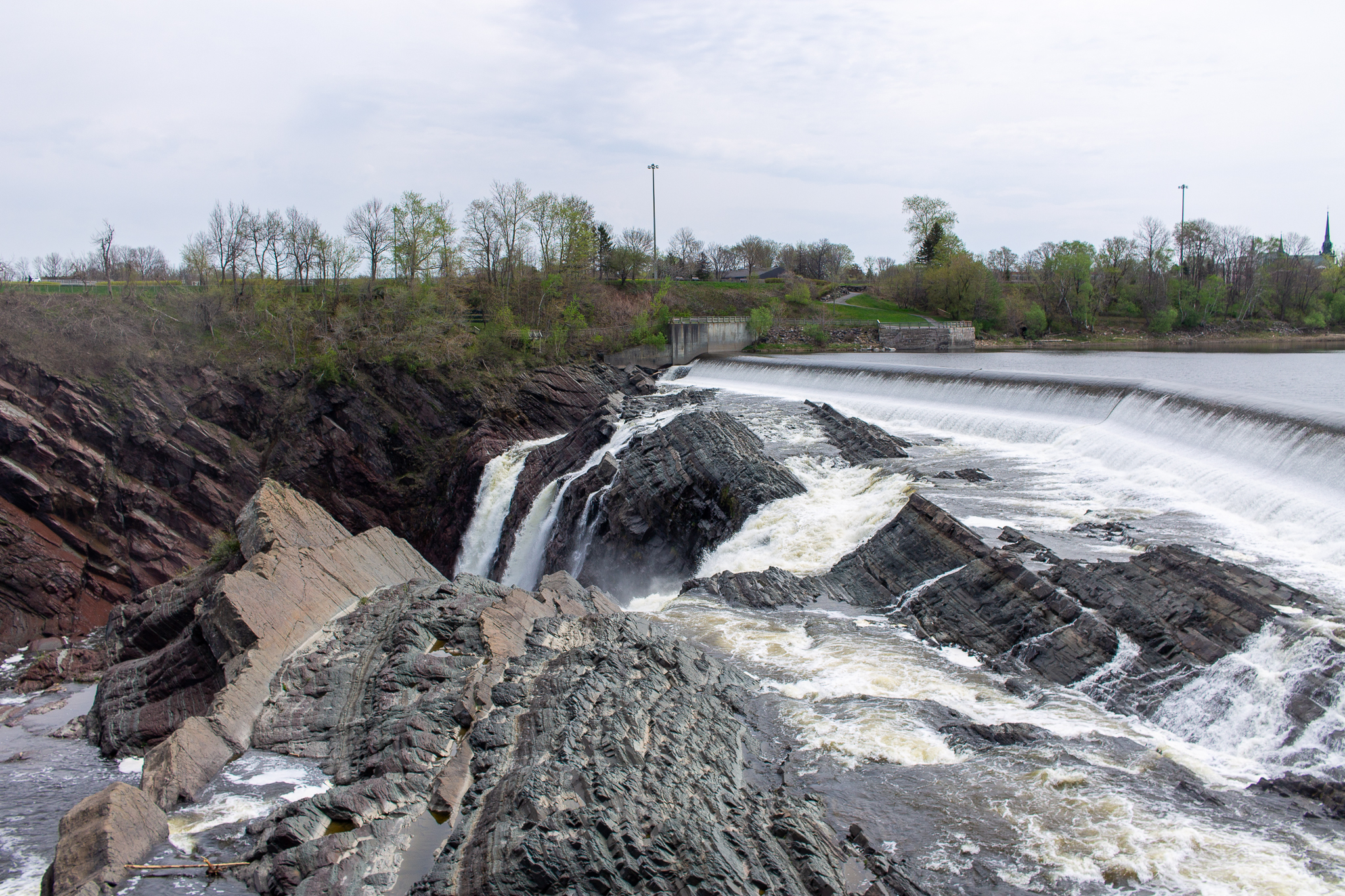
View from the top of the Chaudière Falls

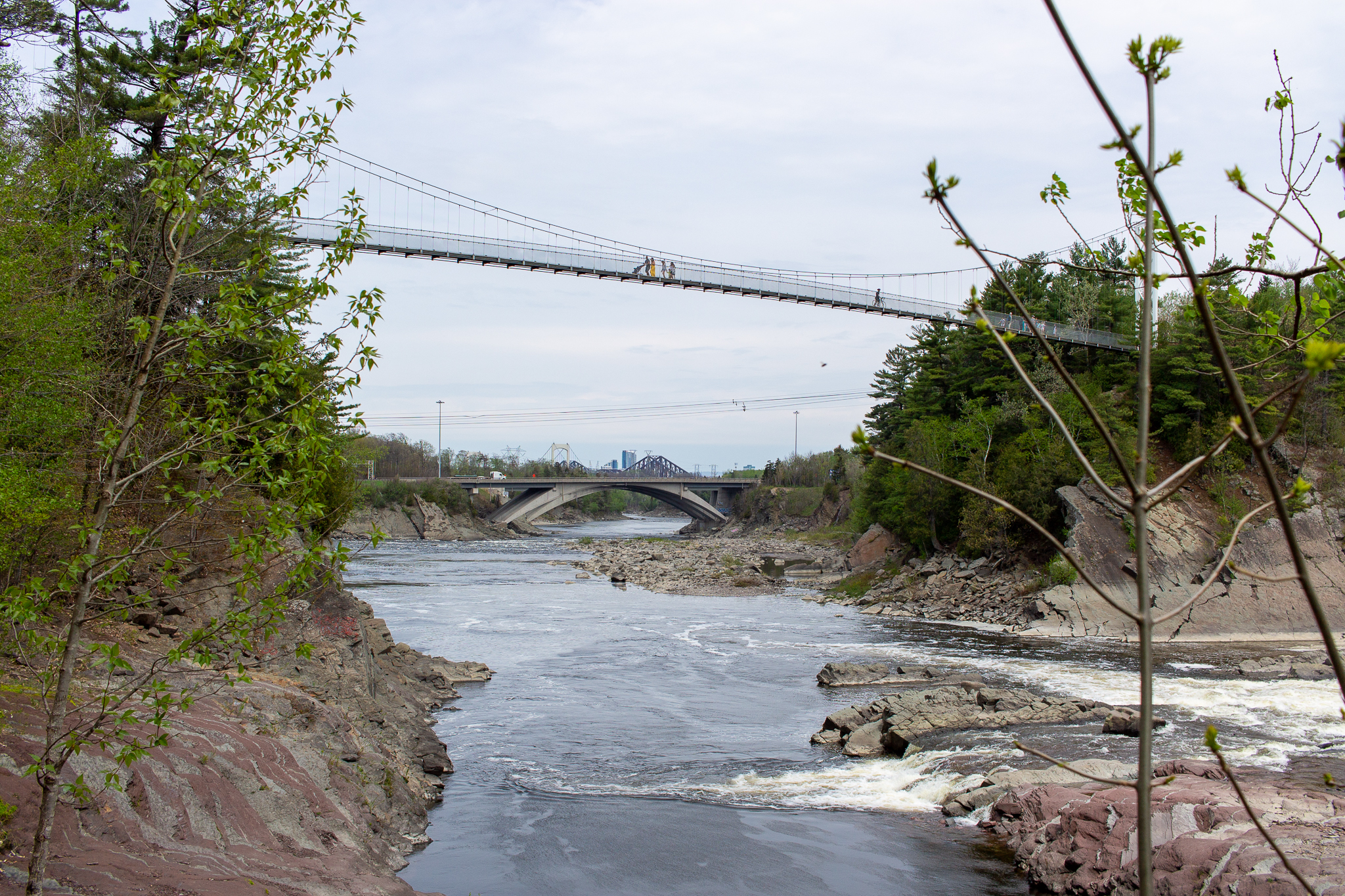
Footbridge on the Chaudière River

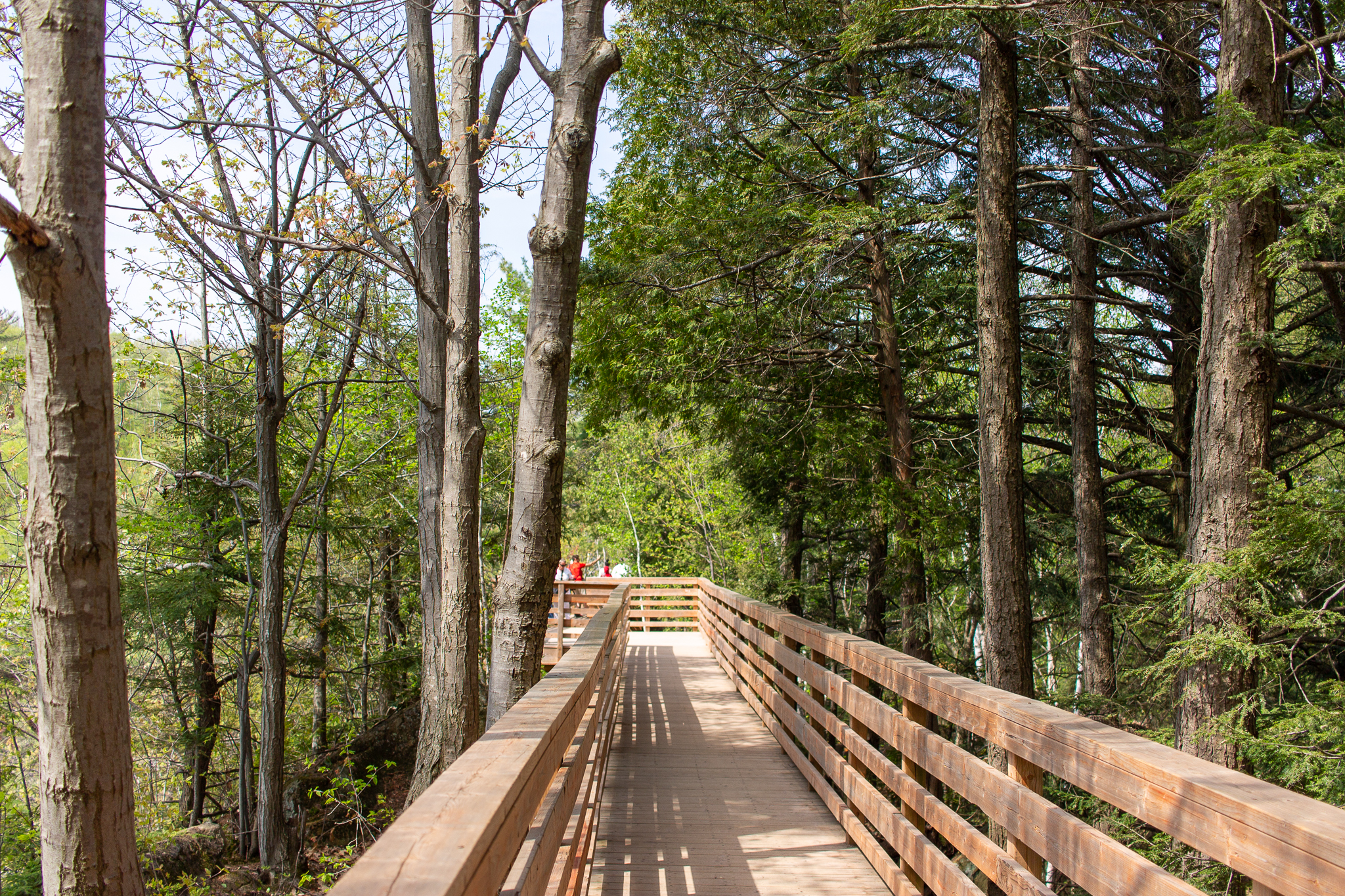
Walking trail in the park

== See also ==
- List of waterfalls
- List of waterfalls of Canada
