= Louise Falls =

Waterfall on the Hay River in the Northwest Territories, Canada

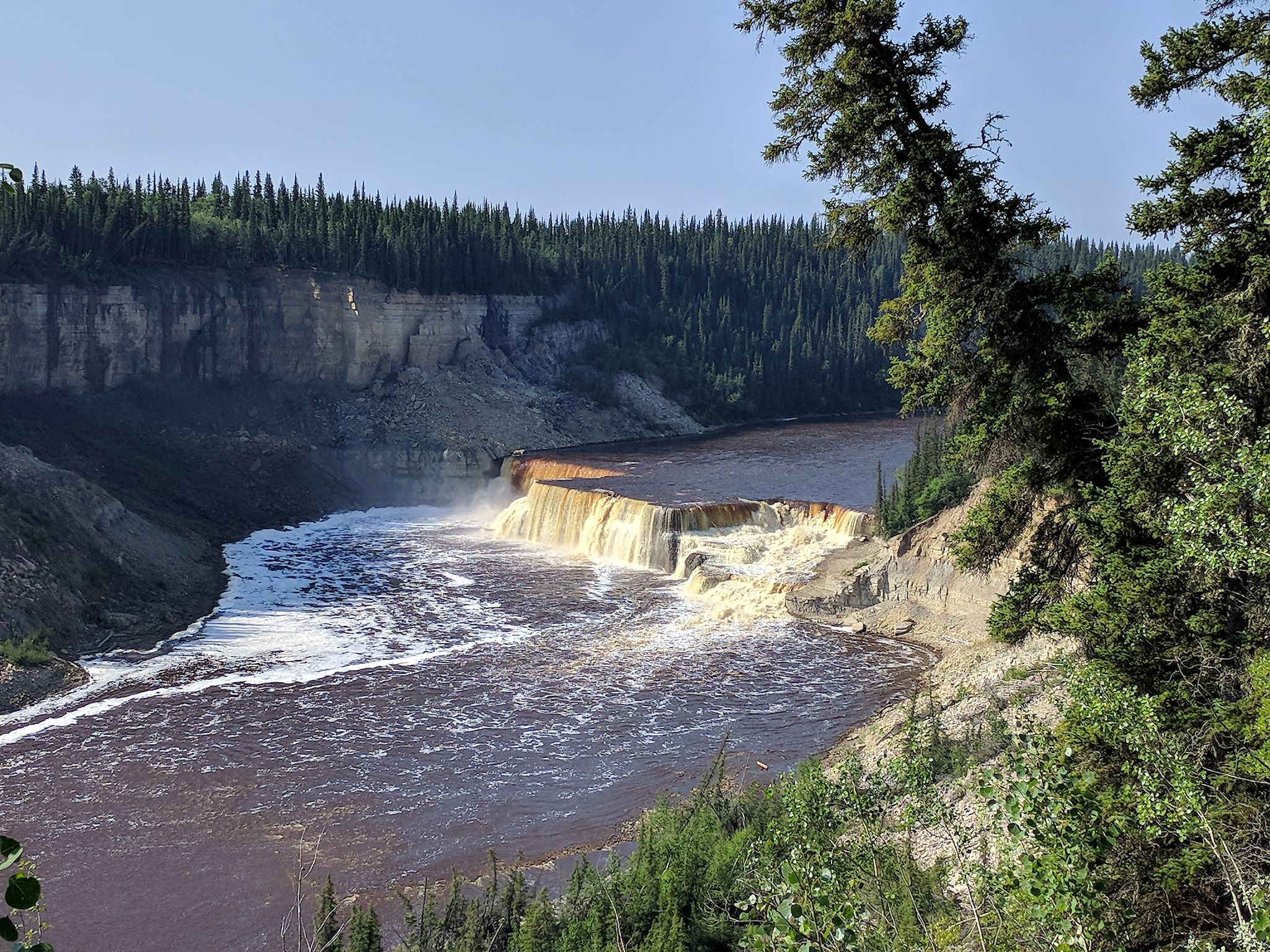
- Interactive map of Louise Falls
- Location: Northwest Territories; Canada
- Coordinates: 60°30′12″N 116°14′29″W
- Type: Vertical Block
- Total height: 15 metres (49 ft)
- Number of drops: 1
- Longest drop: 15 metres (49 ft)
- Average width: 183 metres (600 ft)
- Watercourse: Hay River
- Average flow rate: 282 m^{3}/s (10,000 cu ft/s)

Louise Falls is a waterfall on the Hay River in the Northwest Territories, Canada, located just downstream of higher Alexandra Falls. Both waterfalls are part of Twin Falls Gorge Territorial Park.

== See also ==
- List of waterfalls
- List of waterfalls by flow rate
