= Eaton Canyon (Quebec) =

Canyon in Quebec, Canada

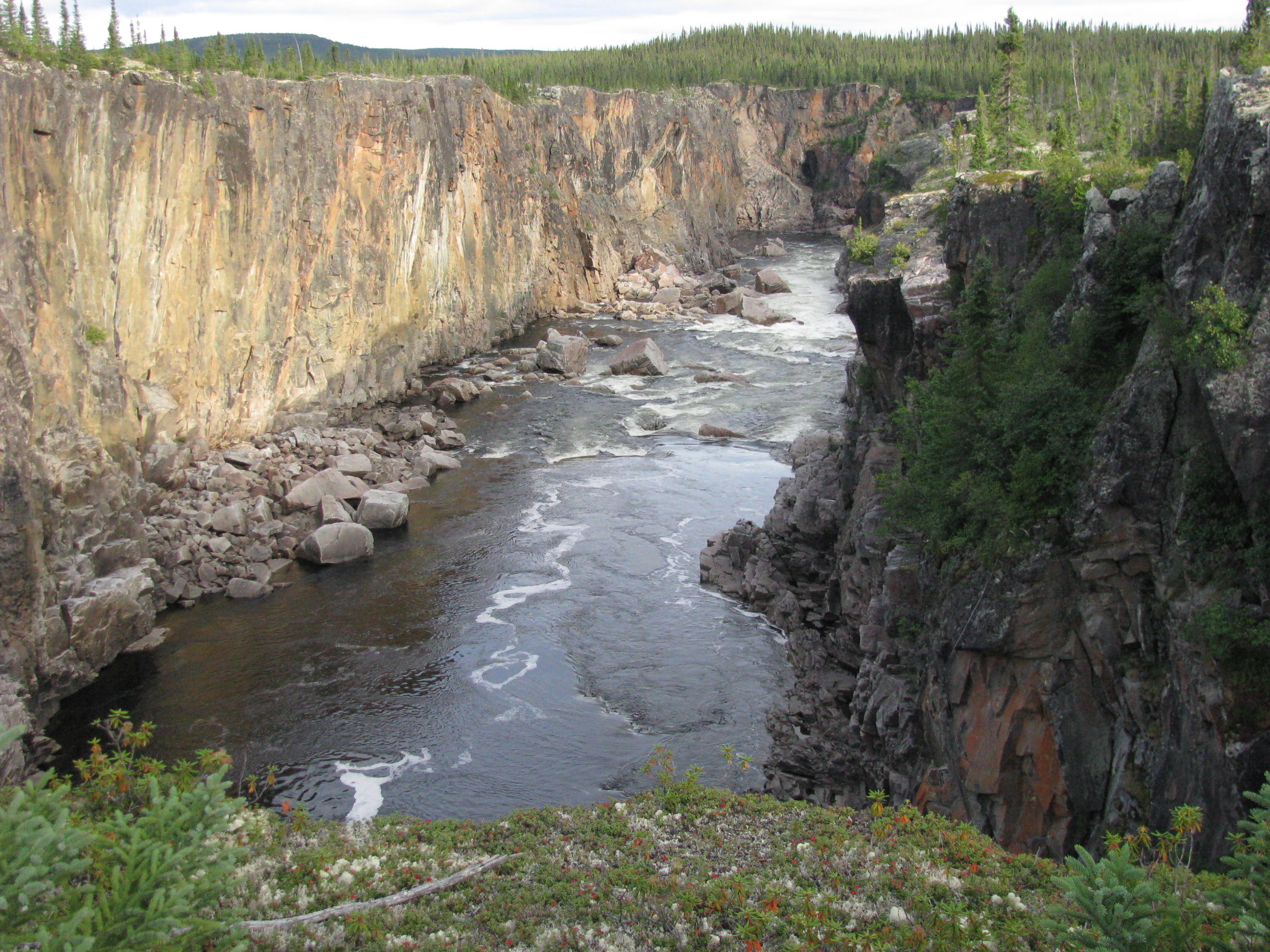
Eaton Canyon

Eaton Canyon (French: Canyon-Eaton) is a canyon on the Caniapiscau River between Rivière du Sable and Goodwood River, about 300 km (190 mi) south of Kuujjuaq and 120 km (75 mi) northwest of Schefferville in Quebec, Canada. It was named by Albert Peter Low after his assistant surveyor David Eaton. Administratively it is located in Rivière-Koksoak, Kativik, Quebec.
