= James Bruce Falls =

Waterfall in British Columbia, Canada

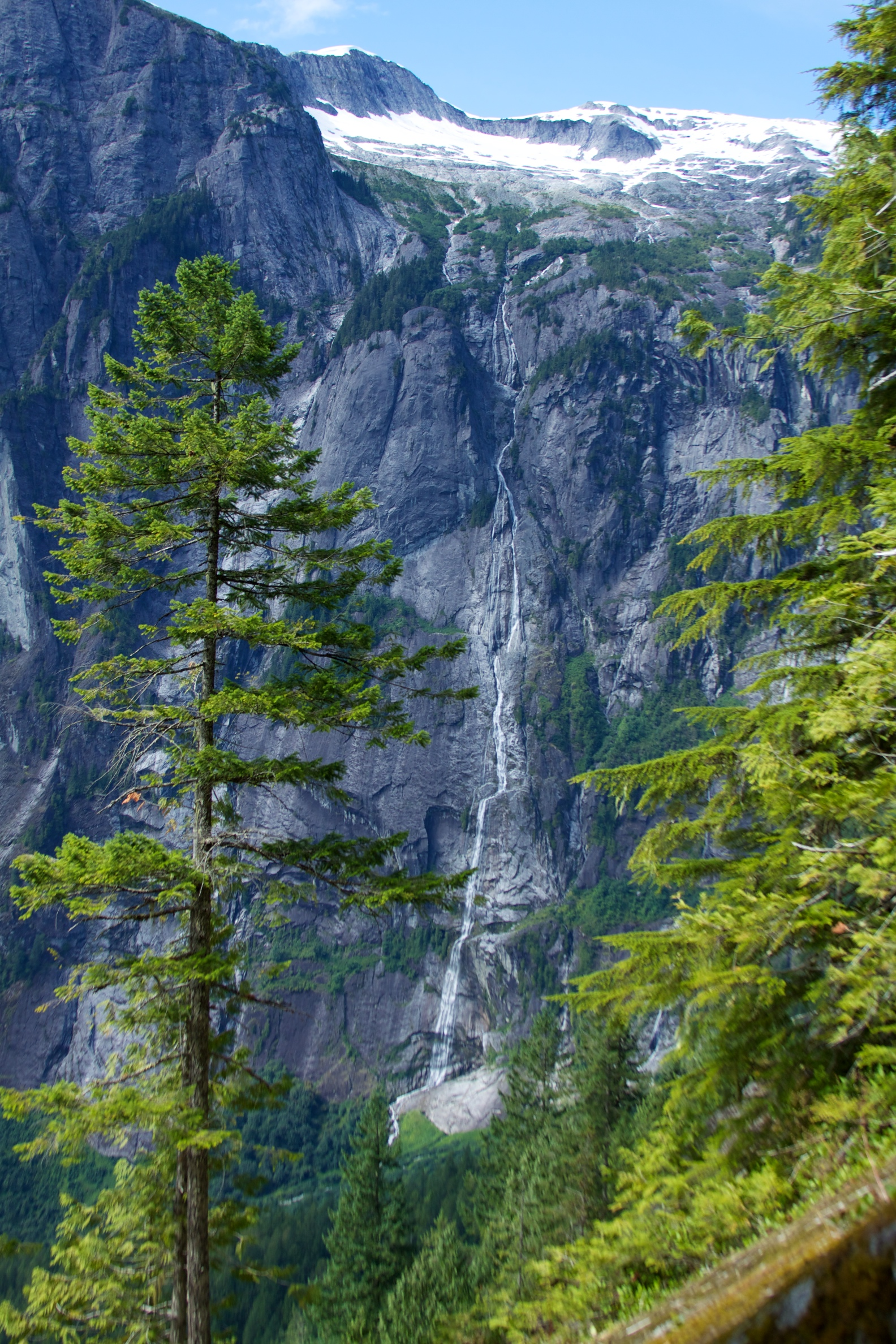
- James Bruce Falls (on the vertical face).
- Interactive map of James Bruce Falls
- Location: Princess Louisa Marine Provincial Park, British Columbia, Canada
- Coordinates: 50°13′08″N 123°46′57″W
- Type: Tiered Horsetail
- Total height: 840 metres (2,760 ft)
- Total width: 4.6 metres (15 ft)
- Watercourse: Unnamed
- World height ranking: 9th

James Bruce Falls (unofficial name) is a waterfall in British Columbia, Canada, the highest-measured waterfall of North America and ninth-tallest in the world.

Located in Princess Louisa Marine Provincial Park, it stems from a small snowfield and cascades 840 metres (2,760 ft) down to Princess Louisa Inlet. Two parallel streams, for which the falls are named, come from this snowfield, and do not have consistent flow throughout the year and during hot summers they usually dry up. The stream flows into Loquilts Creek, which empties into the inlet via the better known Chatterbox Falls.

== See also ==
- List of waterfalls
- List of waterfalls of Canada
- List of waterfalls by height
- List of waterfalls in British Columbia
