= Caniapiscau River =

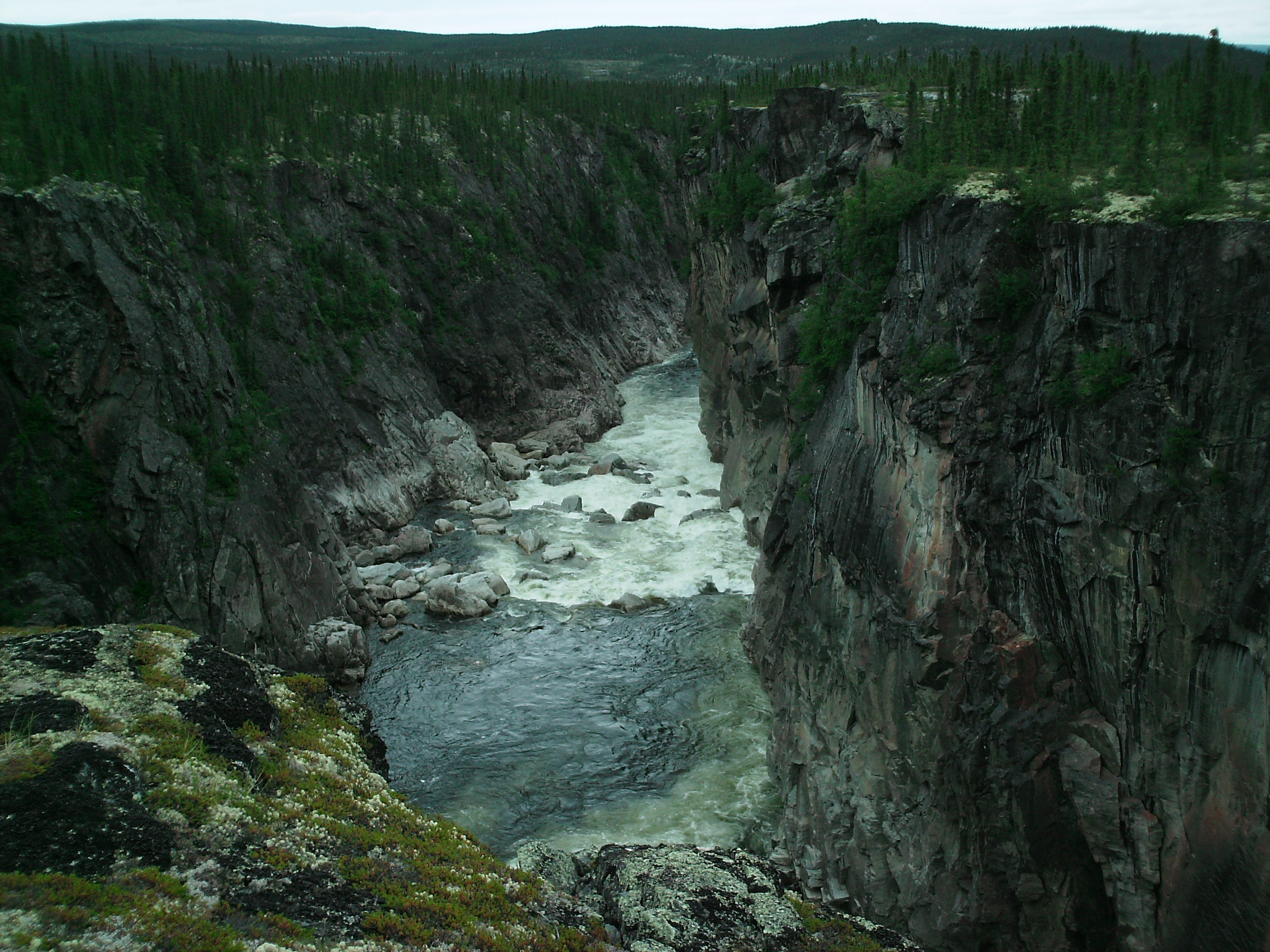
- Eaton Canyon

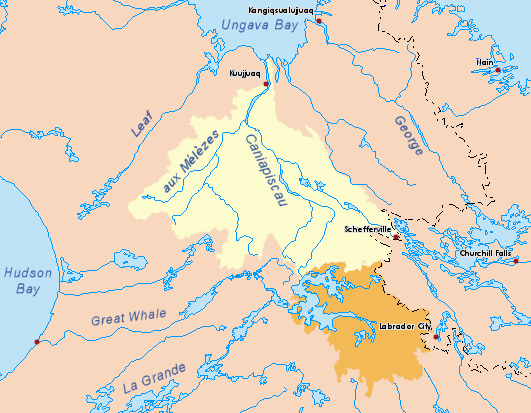
- Drainage basin of the Koksoak River in yellow. Diverted basin of the Caniapiscau River in orange

Location
- Country: Canada
- Province: Quebec
- Region: Nord-du-Québec

Physical characteristics
- Source: Lake Sevestre
  - coordinates: 52°32′23″N 68°01′15″W
  - elevation: 638 m (2,093 ft)
- Mouth: Koksoak River
  - location: About 80 km SW from Kuujjuaq
  - coordinates: 57°40′18″N 69°29′12″W
  - elevation: 20 m (66 ft)
- Length: 737 km (458 mi)

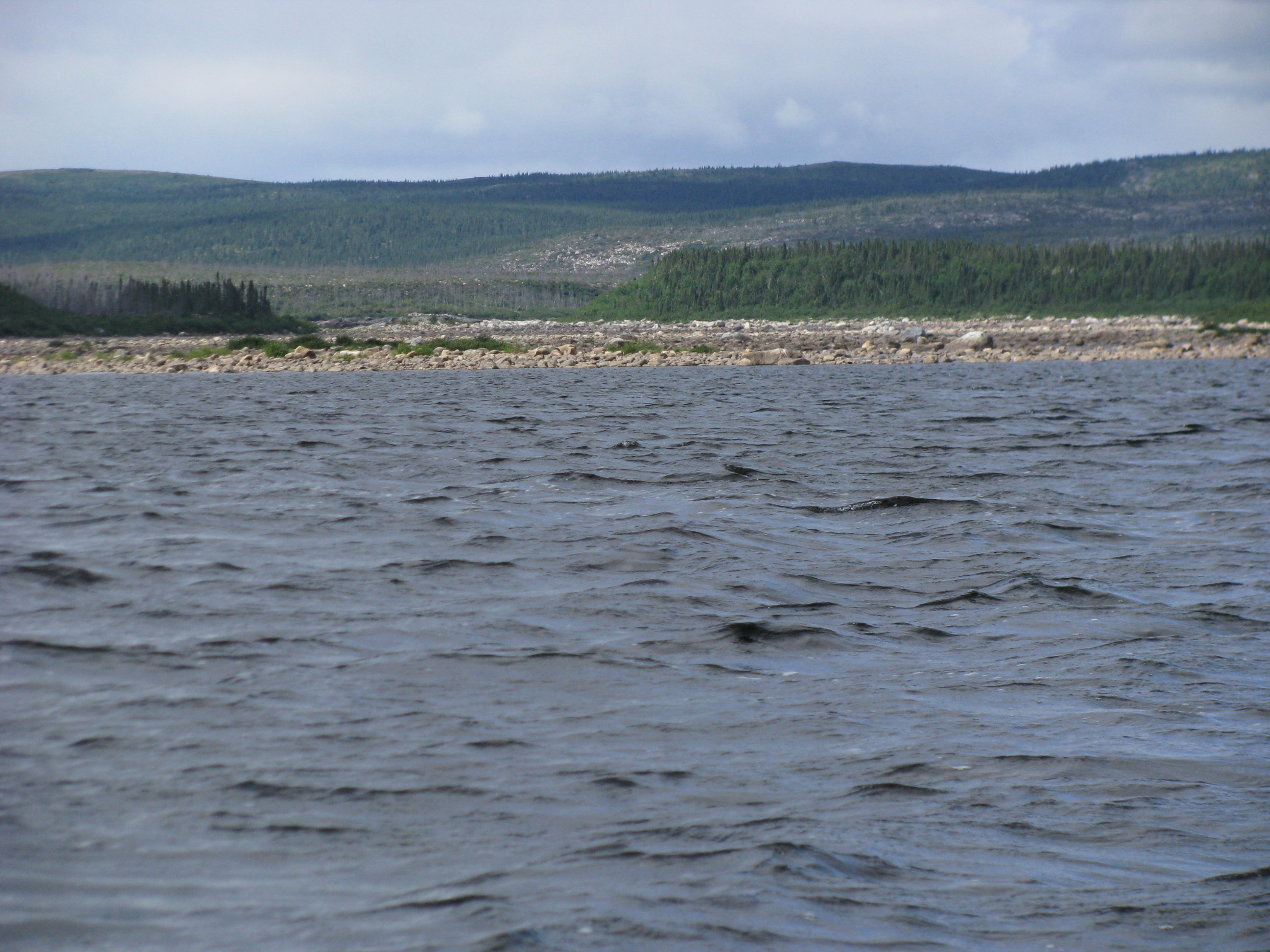
Dry Caniapiscau riverbed at Lower Gorge

The Caniapiscau River (French: rivière Caniapiscau; Naskapi: ᑲᓇᔭᐱᔅᑲᐤ, romanized: kaanaayaapiskaaw) is a tributary of the Koksoak River in Nunavik, Quebec, Canada. In Cree the name of the river means rocky point.

Starting from Lac Sevestre (53 km (33 mi) south-west from Fermont) on the Canadian Shield, the Caniapiscau River flows northward through a wide, timbered glacial valley until it makes a sharp turn at its confluence with the Rivière aux Mélèzes (Larch River). At this point (called Kanniq Confluence), the river becomes the Koksoak River. The total length of the Caniapiscau River is 737 kilometres (458 mi).

Since 1985, the headwaters of the Caniapiscau River have been diverted into the La Grande hydroelectric complex. The headwaters of the Caniapiscau River, representing about 45% of the total flow, now drain into the La Grande River of James Bay. The Caniapiscau Reservoir, which covers about 4,300 km^{2} (1,700 sq mi), or about nine times the size of the natural Lake Caniapiscau, fills a depression in the highest part of the Canadian Shield. The total catchment basin is about 36,800 km^{2} (14,200 sq mi).

Important variations in the water flow of the Caniapiscau River from 1981 to 1984, during the period when the Caniapiscau Reservoir was being filled, may have contributed to the death by drowning of 9,600 migratory woodland caribou in September 1984 at Chute du Calcaire (about 1.5% of George River herd).

The Caniapiscau River basin has no permanent inhabitants, although Cree from the James Bay region as well as southern hunters do travel to the area by bush plane and via the Trans-Taiga Road. From time to time, the river is visited by canoeists.

== Etymology ==
In 1820, James Clouston, an employee of the Hudson's Bay Company, went down the river to its mouth and named it Caniapuscaw River in his diary and map. In 1828, explorer William Hendry identified it as Canniappuscaw. In 1898, the geologist Albert Peter Low used Kaniapiskau, and by the middle of the 20th century, the current spelling came in use.

The Inuit call the river Adlait Kuunga or Allait Kuunga, meaning "Indian River". It was also known as Wauguash River.

== Falls and canyons ==
Caniapiscau River has several spectacular canyons and waterfalls:

- Chute de Facolli - 53°16′35″N 68°18′24″W
- Chute Chambeaux - 53°43′38″N 68°36′52″W
- Upper Gorge - 55°1′34″N 69°39′1″W
- Gorge d'en Bas (Lower Gorge) - 55°30′53″N 68°21′23″W
- Eaton Canyon - 55°33′23″N 68°12′15″W
- Chute au Granite - 55°50′38″N 68°25′18″W
- Chute aux Schistes - 56°44′39″N 69°1′5″W
- Chute de la Pyrite - 57°26′0″N 69°14′33″W
- Chute du Calcaire - 57°28′48″N 69°18′30″W
- Manitou Gorge - 57°33′2″N 69°26′38″W

== Tributaries ==
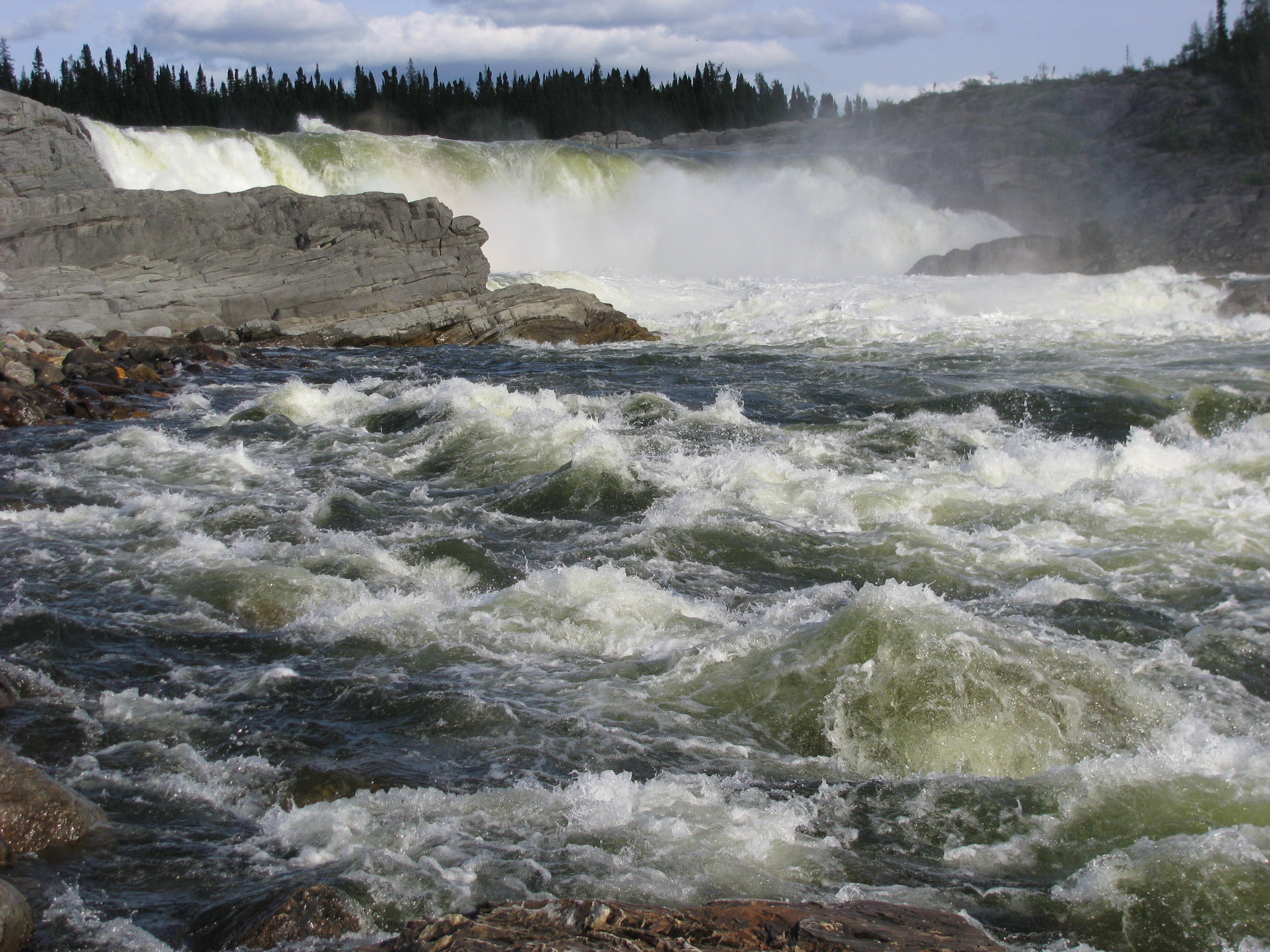
Limestone Falls

- Rivière Bras de Fer
- Rivière du Sable
- Goodwood River
- Rivière Sérigny
- Rivière Pons
- Rivière Beurling
- Rivière de la Mort
- Rivière Châteauguay
- Swampy Bay River
- Situraviup River
- Forbes River
