= Six Mile Lake (Ontario) =

Lake in Muskoka District Municipality, Ontario, Canada

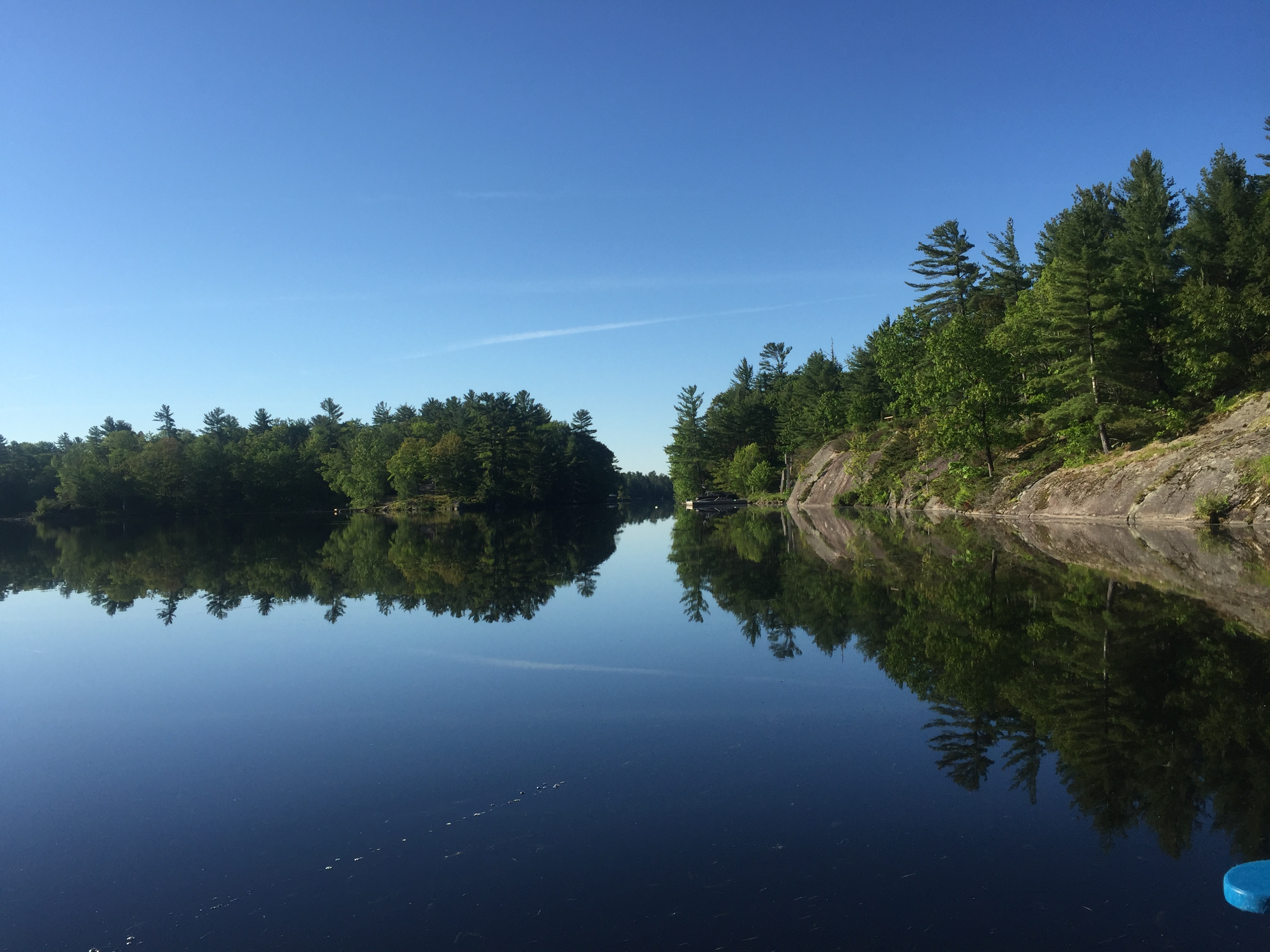

- Location within Ontario
- Location: Georgian Bay, Ontario
- Coordinates: 44.9°N 79.7°W
- Basin countries: Canada

Six Mile Lake is in the Township of Georgian Bay, Muskoka, Ontario and has an eponymous Provincial Park.

== See also ==
- List of lakes in Ontario
