= Nigel Creek =

Stream in the country of Canada

Coordinates: 52°09′56″N 117°02′17″W

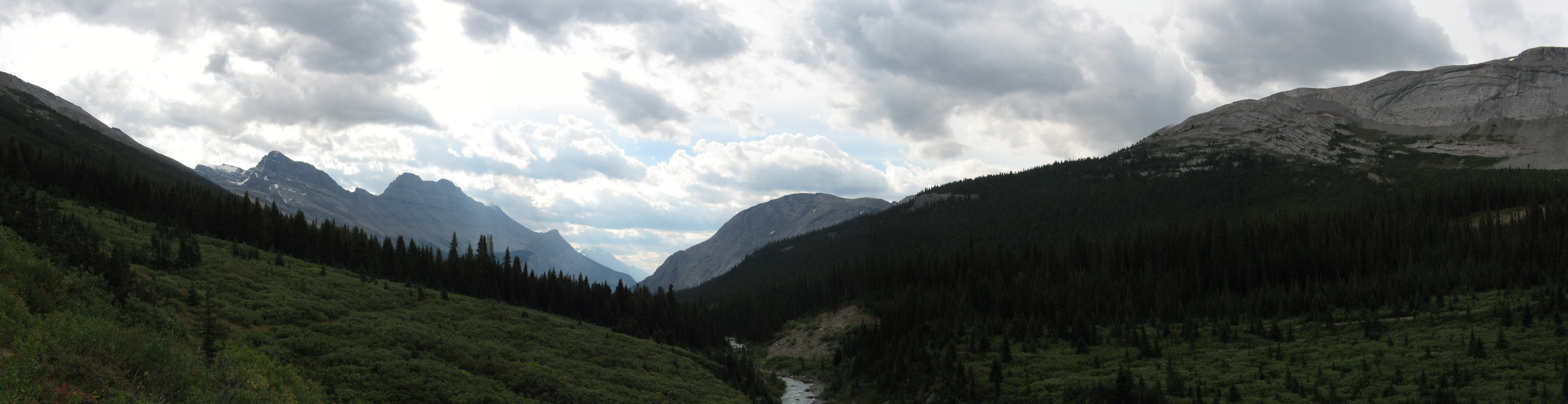
Nigel Creek flowing from Nigel Pass

Nigel Creek is a short stream located in the Canadian Rockies of Alberta, Canada. It forms in the glacial meltwaters north of Sunwapta Pass and takes on streams flowing from Nigel Pass.

The creek flows South-Southeast, and parallels the Icefields Parkway for part of its course. It joins the North Saskatchewan River near the Big Bend. It plummets over Bridal Veil Falls before entering the North Saskatchewan. Nigel Creek is named after Nigel Vavasoeur, a packer who accompanied early climbing expeditions in the region.

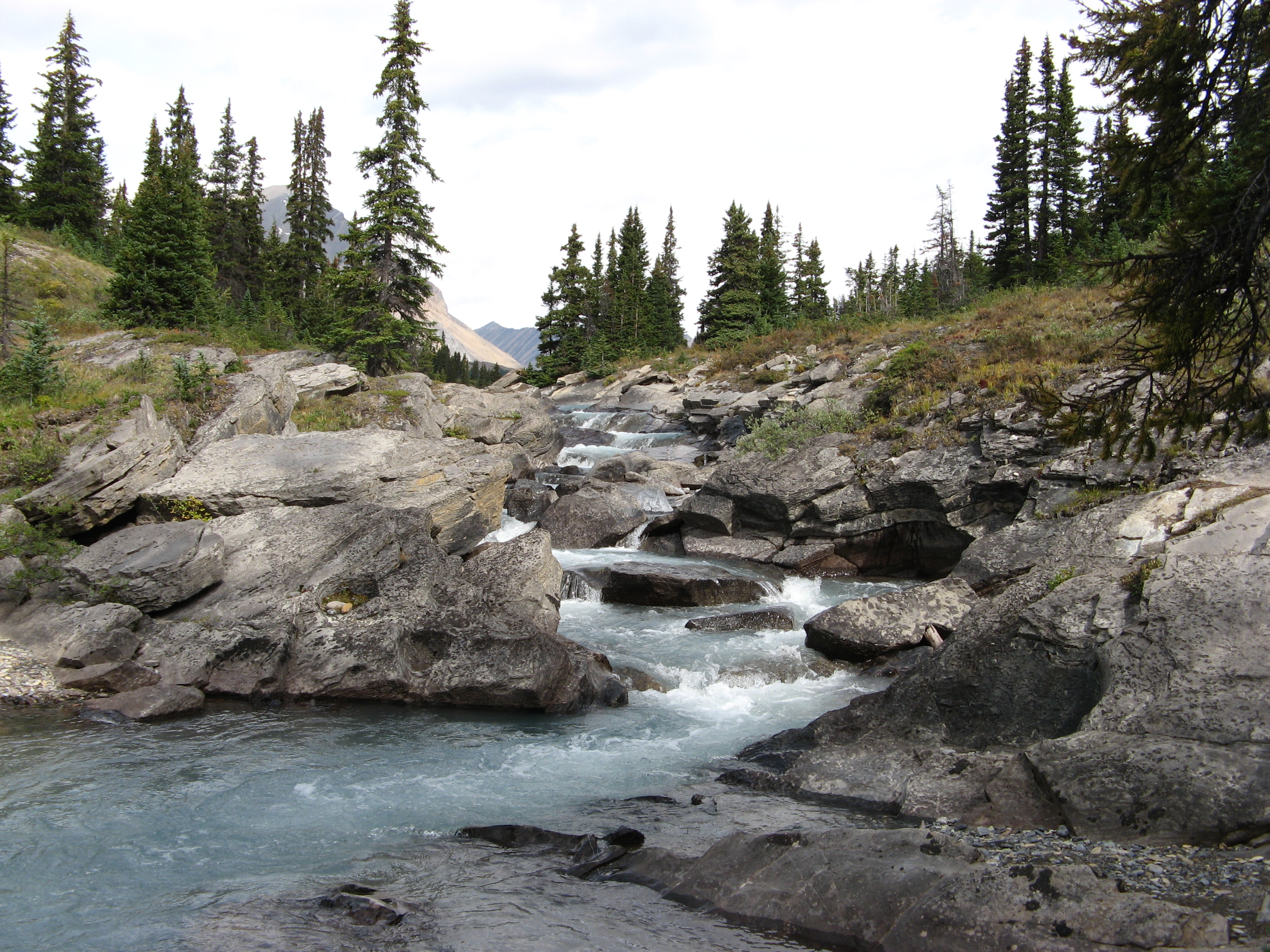
Nigel Creek seen from Nigel Pass

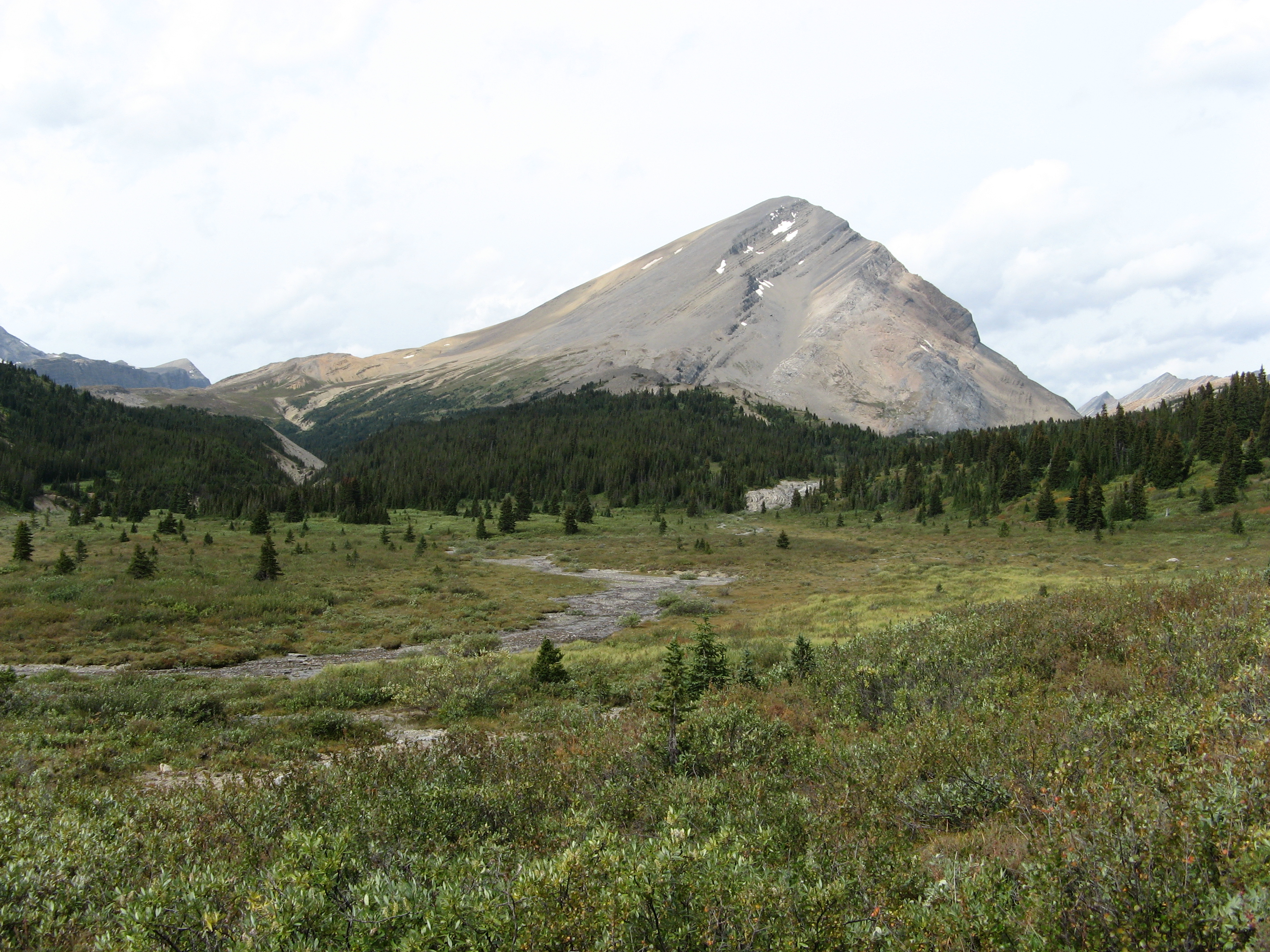

== See also ==
- List of Alberta rivers
