= Run (waterfalls) =

Horizontal distance a waterfall flows

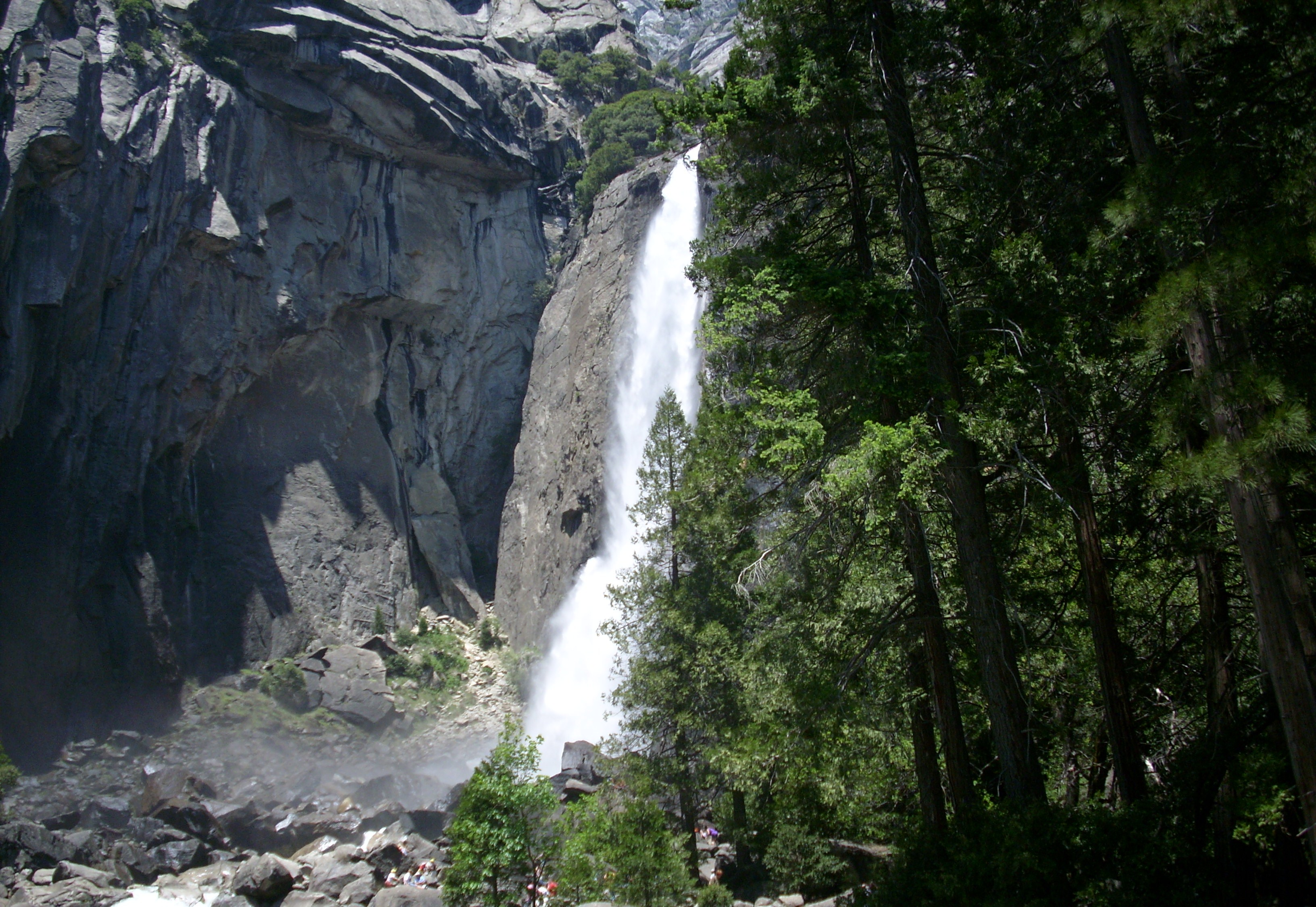
Lower Yosemite Falls is an example of a waterfall that has a short run, because its gradient is more vertical.

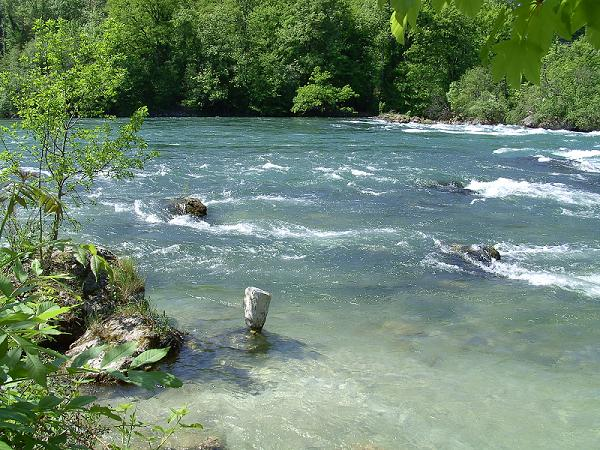
Rapids typically have a much longer run than vertical waterfalls.

In waterfalls, the run (also known as the runout) is the linear distance the stream flows from the brink of the waterfall to its base. Therefore, a steeper waterfall would have a shorter run, and a less inclined waterfall would have a longer run. As an example, rapids typically have longer runs, as their actual drop is usually much shorter than the distance they flow. Vertical waterfalls, such as Yosemite Falls, have short runs.
