= Fall line =

Meeting point of uplands and coastal plain

A fall line (or fall zone) is the area where an upland region and a coastal plain meet and is especially noticeable at the place rivers cross it, with resulting rapids or waterfalls. The uplands are relatively hard crystalline basement rock, and the coastal plain is softer sedimentary rock. A fall line often will recede upstream as a river cuts out the uphill dense material, forming "c"-shaped waterfalls and exposing bedrock shoals. Due to these features, riverboats typically cannot travel any further inland without portaging, unless locks are built. The rapid change of elevation of the water and resulting energy release make the fall line a good location for water mills, grist mills, and sawmills. Seeking a head of navigation with a ready supply of water power, people have long made settlements where rivers cross a fall line.

== Geography ==
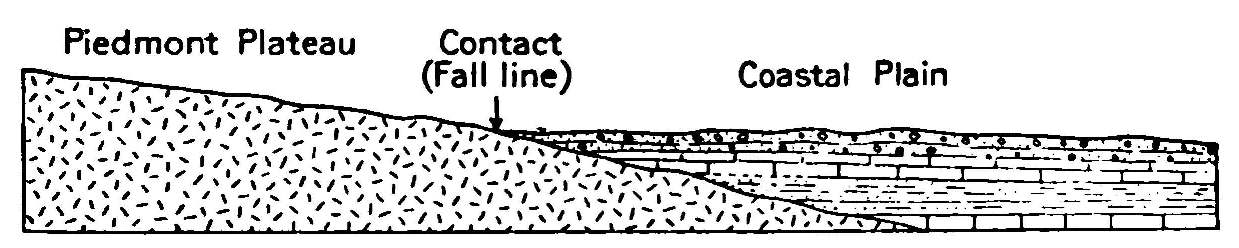
Diagram showing the Fall Line. USGS figure.

The slope of rivers crossing fall zones affected settlement patterns. For example, the fall line represents the inland limit of navigation of many rivers. Numerous cities along a fall line grew as a result of demand for transferring people and goods between land-based and water-based transportation at that place.

== Examples ==
=== Atlantic Seaboard Fall Line ===
The Atlantic Seaboard Fall Line is a 1,400-kilometre (900-mile) escarpment where the Piedmont and Atlantic Coastal Plain meet in the eastern United States. Much of the Atlantic Seaboard fall line passes through areas where no evidence of faulting is present.

The fall line marks the geologic boundary of hard metamorphosed terrain—the product of the Taconic orogeny—and the sandy, relatively flat outwash plain of the upper continental shelf, formed of unconsolidated Cretaceous and Tertiary sediments. Examples of the Fall Zone include the Potomac River's Little Falls and the rapids in Richmond, Virginia, where the James River falls across a series of rapids down to the tidal estuary of the James River.

=== Canada ===
The Laurentian Upland forms a long scarp line where it meets the Great Lakes–St. Lawrence Lowlands, just north of the St. Lawrence River and estuary. Along this line, numerous rivers have carved falls and canyons (listed east to west):

- Saint Anne Falls and Canyon Sainte-Anne (River Sainte-Anne-du-Nord)
- Chaudron à Gaudreault (Rivière aux Chiens)
- Unnamed falls (Rivière du Sault à la Puce)
- Canyon of the River Cazeau
- Montmorency Falls (River Montmorency)
- Kabir Kouba Fall (River Saint-Charles)
- Chute Ford (River Sainte-Anne)
- Sainte-Ursule Falls (River Maskinongé)
- Chute à Magnan (Rivière du Loup)
- Chutes Émery and Chute du Moulin Coutu (Rivière Bayonne)
- Les sept chutes (River de L'Assomption)
- Dorwin Falls (River Ouareau)
- Wilson Falls (Rivière du Nord)
- Long Sault, now flooded by the Carillon hydroelectric generating station (Ottawa River)
  - The Chaudière Falls run over the unrelated Eardley Escarpment of the Ottawa-Bonnechere Graben.

The River Jacques-Cartier and River Saint-Maurice lack such noticeable features because they cross the scarp through U-shaped valleys. The falls of the lower Saint-Maurice (as well as those of the River Beauport, in Quebec City) are due to the fluvial terraces of the St. Lawrence River rather than the Laurentian Scarp.

== See also ==
- Geologic map of Georgia (U.S. state)
- Spring line settlement - the analogous concept where access to fresh water is more important than navigation or power
