= Charlevoix Railway =

Railway in Quebec, Canada

Charlevoix Railway, Chemin de fer Charlevoix
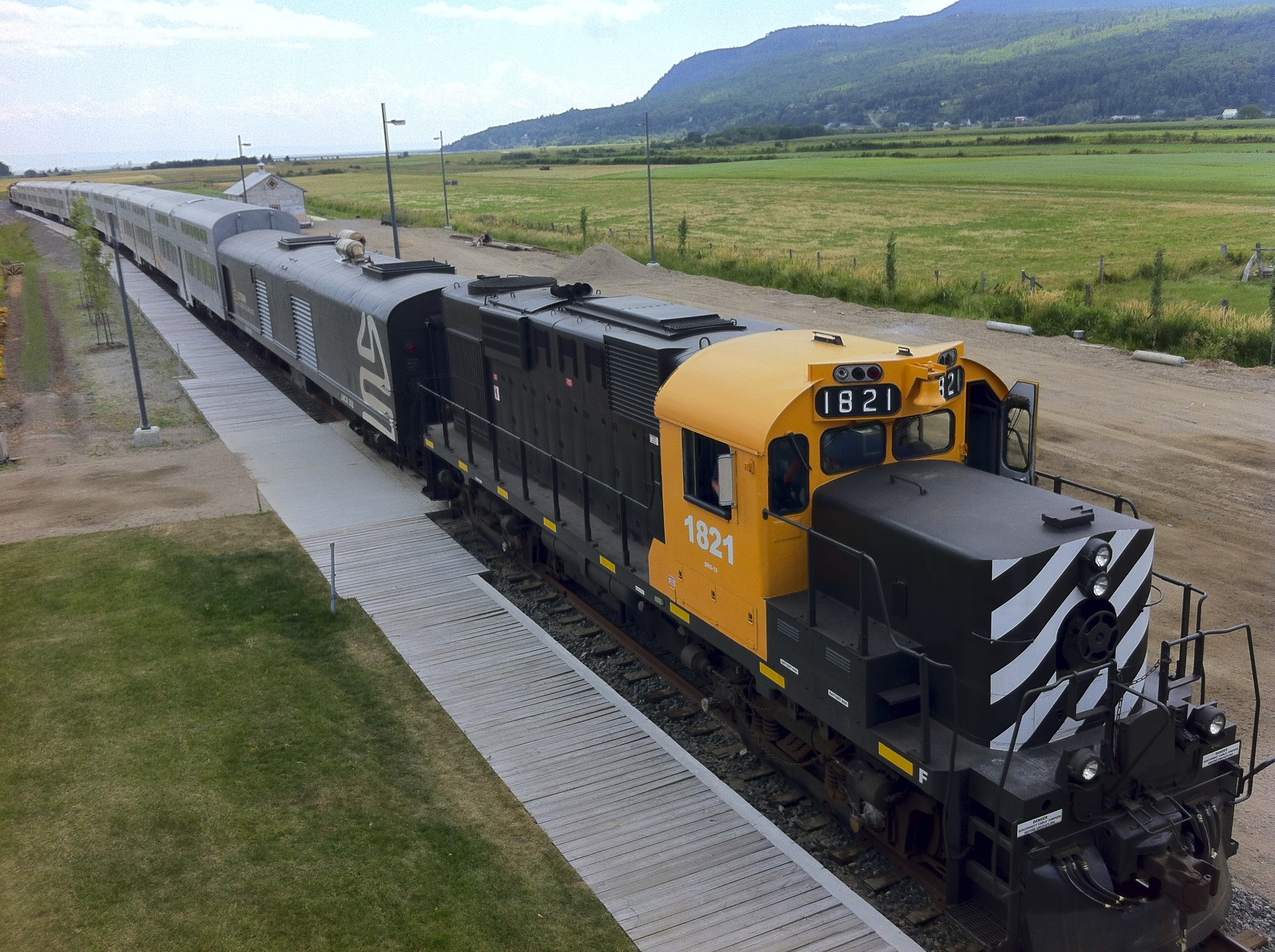
- The Le Massif Charlevoix train at Baie-Saint-Paul

Overview
- Headquarters: 5 rue Desbiens; Clermont, Quebec, G4A1B8
- Reporting mark: CFC
- Locale: Charlevoix and Capitale-Nationale regions of Quebec
- Dates of operation: 10 August 1889–present
- Predecessor: Quebec, Montmorency and Charlevoix Railway (1881–1904); Quebec Railway, Light and Power Company (1904–1951); Canadian National Railway (1951–1994)

Technical
- Track gauge: 4 ft 8 1/2 in (1,435 mm) standard gauge
- Electrification: From 1900 to 1959
- Length: 144 kilometres (89 mi)

Other
- Website: Train de Charlevoix

The Charlevoix Railway (French: Chemin de fer Charlevoix) (reporting mark CFC) is a short-line railway that operates in the Charlevoix region of Quebec, Canada. From 1994 to 2009 it was a subsidiary of the Quebec Railway Corporation, a short line operator. Since April 2009 it has been owned by Train touristique de Charlevoix Inc., a Groupe Le Massif Inc. (owners of Le Massif) subsidiary. With a length of 144–148 kilometres (89–92 mi) it connects the city of Clermont in the Charlevoix region to a freight yard of the Canadian National Railway (CN) located in the La Cité-Limoilou borough of the city of Quebec. The railway runs along both the St. Lawrence River and the Malbaie River and consists of a single non-electrified track.

The railway carried passengers at its start in the 19th century, for much of the early part of the 20th century, and as part of a dinner train operation in the 1980s and again in the 1990s. Passenger service on a tourist train between Quebec City and La Malbaie began in September 2011. As a freight railway the main commodities transported are: clay, timber, lumber, cement, woodchips, paper, and peroxide.

== History ==
The Quebec, Montmorency and Charlevoix Railway Company (QM&C) was incorporated by an act of the Legislature of Quebec in 1881. The railway was to be built along the Saint Lawrence River and was intended to provide service to as far east as Baie-Sainte-Catherine, which was in turn expected to be developed into a major seaport with ice free shipping even in winter.

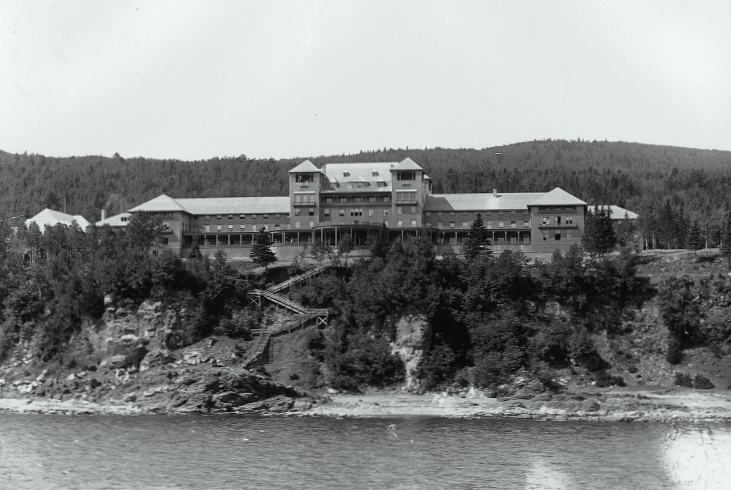
The first Manoir Richelieu in 1899. Note the absence of rails along the river at the time.

The first part of the line between Limoilou and Sainte-Anne-de-Beaupré, Quebec went into service on Saturday 10 August 1889. It was built at the time for the pilgrimage to the Basilica of Sainte-Anne-de-Beaupré, and the railway was nicknamed the "Railway of Good Saint Anne". Initial operations were with steam locomotive hauled trains. The line was electrified in 1904, when the company changed its name to Quebec Railway Light & Power (QRL&P). Between 1904 and 1959 electric trains provided an interurban type service for passengers between Quebec and Sainte-Anne-de-Beaupré.

The second part of the line, extending from Beaupré to Clermont in Charlevoix, was built between 1909 and 1919. Rodolphe Forget had built his large Manoir Richelieu at Pointe-au-Pic (now part of La Malbaie) in the 1890s. At first hotel guests would get to the hotel via Canada Steamship Lines steamships. Rodolphe Forget ran for the House of Commons in 1904 promising voters to extend the QM&C line, which was eventually done. This part of the line is very scenic because it is literally wedged between mountains and river. It required huge investments in time and money: there are two tunnels and 900 bridges and culverts, or an average of one every 165 metres (541 ft).

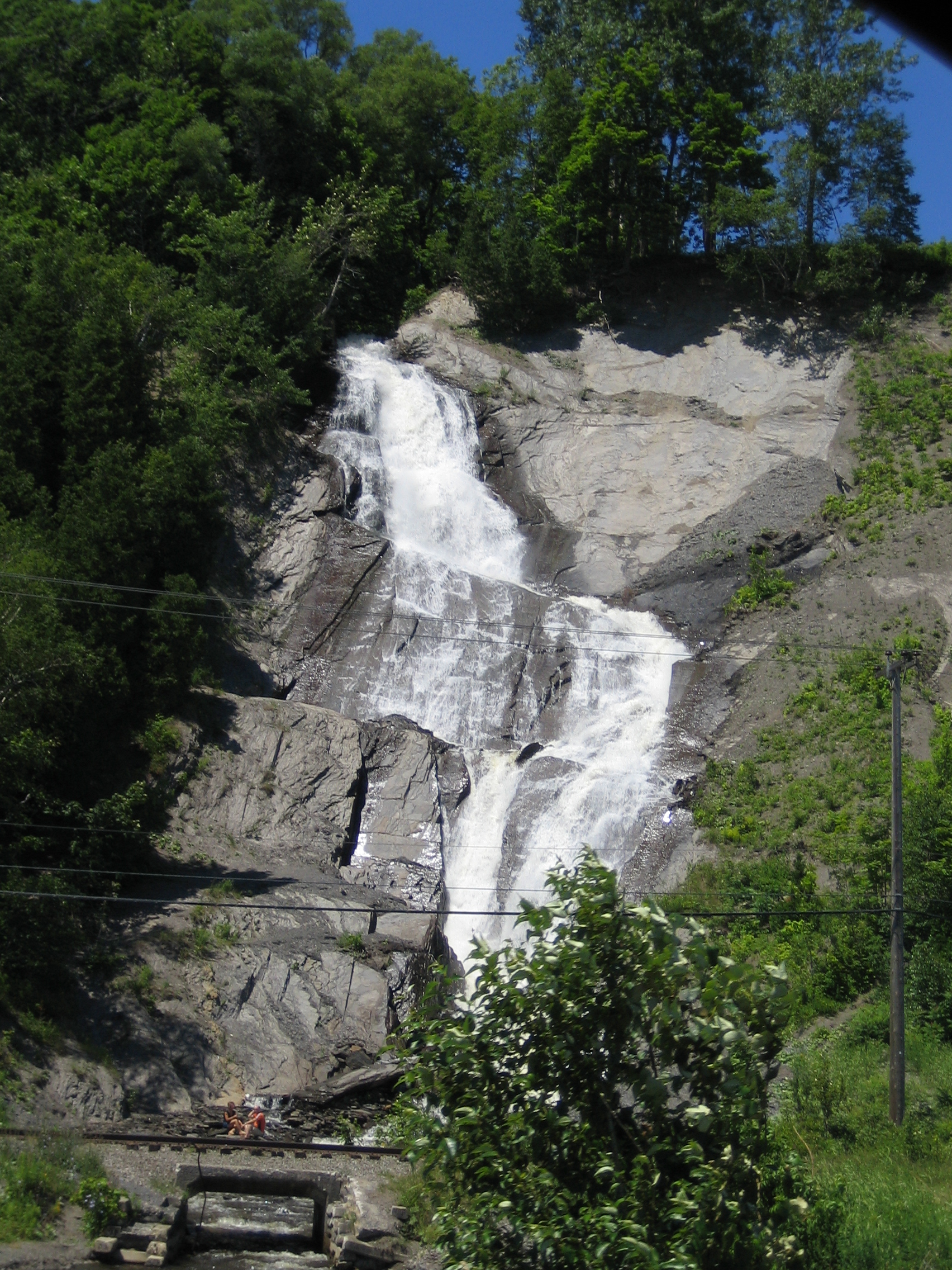
The railway traverses a small bridge in front of a waterfall near Montmorency, 16 July 2005

With the line extended Manoir Richelieu hotel customers could use the QRL&P trains instead of CSL vessels to get to the hotel. The hotel building burned down in the fall of 1928 but was rebuilt to designs by John Smith Archibald and reopened in June 1929. CSL vessels continued to call on the hotel until 1966.

In 1951 CN took over as owner of the railway. The line became known as the Murray Bay Subdivision of CN, Murray Bay being an English name for La Malbaie. In 1959 CN terminated passenger service and dismantled the overhead lines used for electrification between Limoilou and Saint-Joachim.

In 1984 the line saw the reintroduction of passenger service when a dinner train known as the Le Tortillard du Saint-Laurent started operating between Quebec and La Malbaie. The train ran through the 1985 season before closing. In 1994 CN sold the whole line to the Quebec Railway Corporation. The Tortillard du Saint-Laurent dinner train was restarted under another company and ran again in 1995 and 1996 before declaring bankruptcy. In 1996 the Charlevoix Railway Company created a major timber transshipment yard at Clermont, which is used by almost all timber processors of the Côte-Nord.

On 7 May 2007 Nancy Belley, who had spent more than 10 years managing the Chemin de fer Charlevoix subsidiary of the Quebec Rail Corporation, was hired by Le Massif to serve as the manager of their railway project. In April 2009 Le Massif de Charlevoix organization purchased the line between Quebec and La Malbaie from the Quebec Railway Corporation. Track rehabilitation for a new tourist line began in October 2009. Infrastructure Canada announced in November 2009 that the governments of Canada and Quebec will contribute CA$5 million toward the railway line upgrade. CN still uses the line to haul freight between Clermont and Quebec via trackage rights. The Port of Quebec City lists the Chemin de fer Charlevoix as a rail transport provider to the port's facilities.

Beginning in September 2011, a new tourist train service began operation along the Charlevoix Railway between Quebec City and La Malbaie.

== Stations served ==
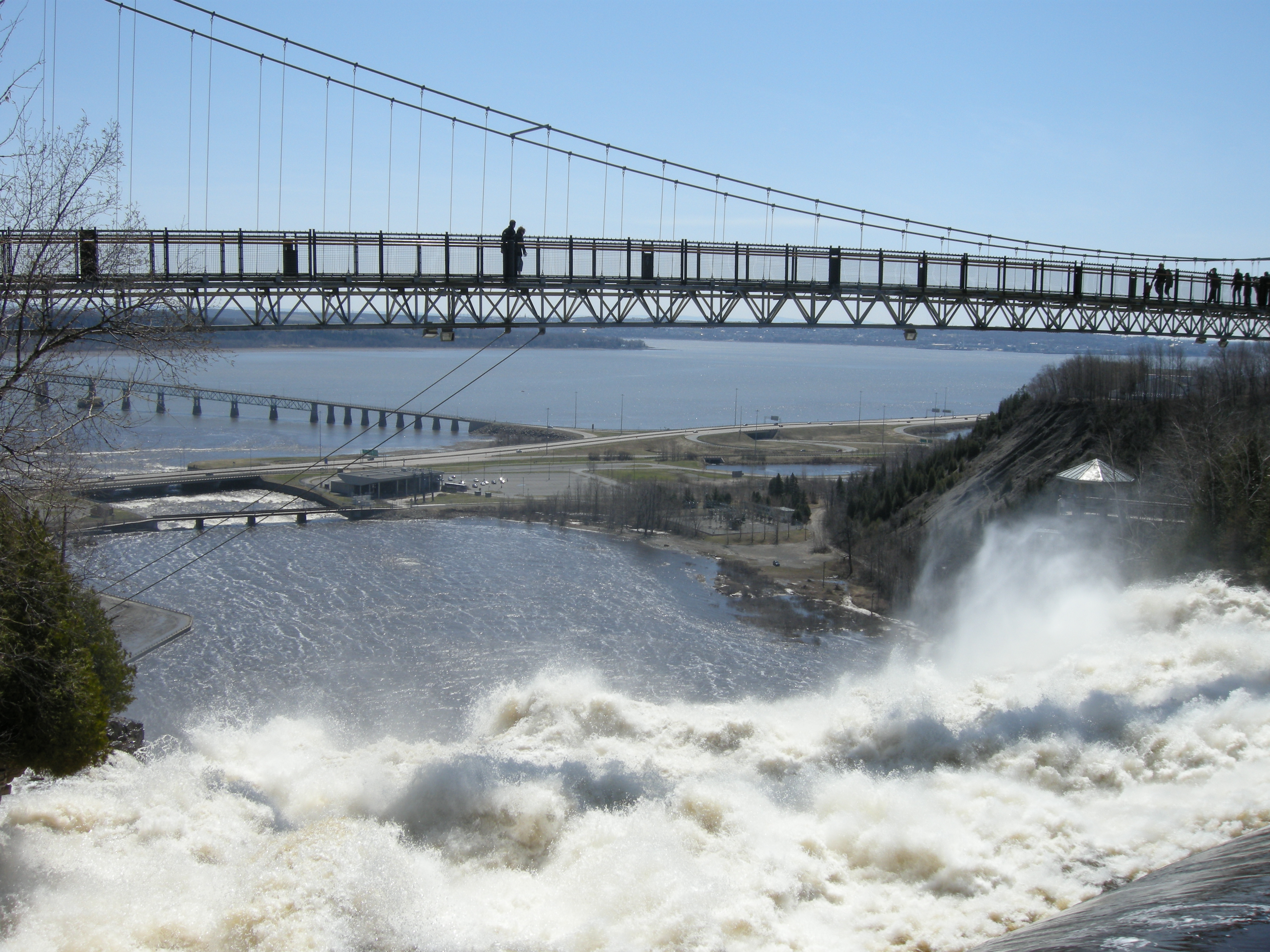
View overlooking the top of Montmorency Falls where the Montmorency River flows into the St. Lawrence River. The Charlevoix Railway bridge over the Montmorency River is visible at the further end of the plunge pool. Beyond it lies a bridge carrying Route 138 and beyond that is the Île d'Orléans Bridge over the St. Lawrence, 26 April 2009.

There are several stations served by the railway from Quebec running east and north to Clermont:

- Quebec City
- Limoilou
- Hedley (or Hedleyville) which has been part of La Cité-Limoilou since 1903
- Villeneuve
- Sainte-Anne-de-Beaupré
- Donohue (just east of Beaupré) the paper mill was sold to Abitibi-Consolidated in 2000, then merged into AbitibiBowater in 2007
- Saint-Joachim labelled "Les Caps" by CN
- Point D'Aulne (northeast of Petite-Rivière-Saint-François)
- Baie-Saint-Paul
- La Malbaie
- Wieland
- Clermont, Capitale-Nationale, Quebec line ends at a former Donohue paper mill along rue de la Donohue

== Quebec Railway Light & Power Network ==
This route map shows stations served by Q.R.L.& P.Co. from 1889 to 1959, including car stops and Upper Line to Kenthouse (Manoir Montmorency).

The original stations were:

- Hedleyville (Limoilou)
- Giffard (Beauport)
- Village Montmorency
- L'Ange-Gardien
- Château-Richer
- Sainte-Anne-de-Beaupré
- Beaupré
- Saint-Joachim

== See also ==
- Grand railway hotels of Canada
- Train de Charlevoix
- List of heritage railways in Canada
