= Train de Charlevoix =

Tourist train serving the Charlevoix region of Quebec, Canada

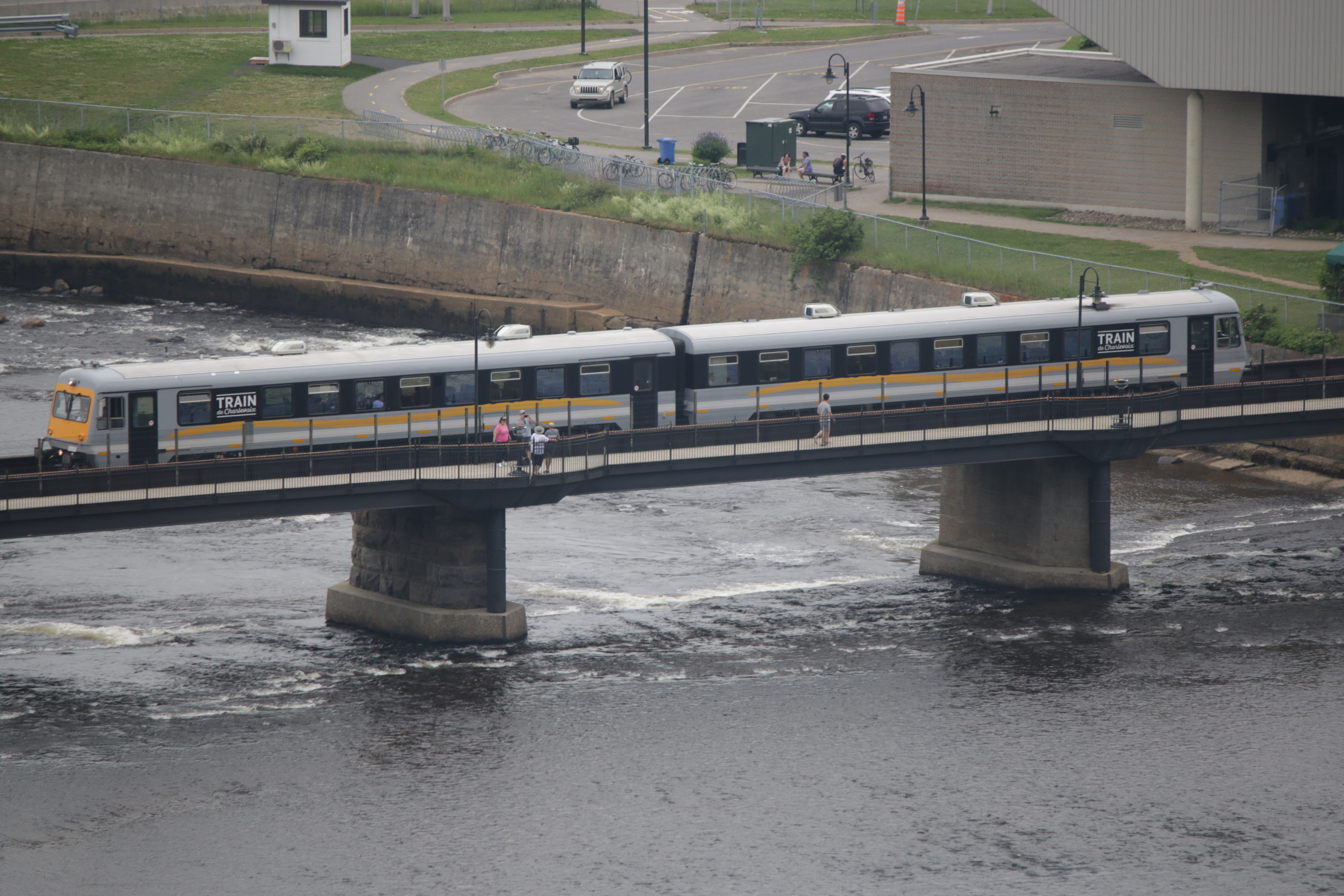
- The train seen crossing the river downstream of Montmorency Falls
- Locale: Charlevoix & Capitale-Nationale regions of Quebec
- Terminus: Montmorency Falls; La Malbaie

Commercial operations
- Built by: Quebec, Montmorency and Charlevoix Railway
- Original gauge: 4 ft 8 1/2 in (1,435 mm) standard gauge

Preserved operations
- Owned by: Le Massif de Charlevoix
- Operated by: Le Massif de Charlevoix
- Preserved gauge: 1,435 mm (4 ft 8 1/2 in) standard gauge

Preservation history
- 2008: Track renovation; Start of tourist operation
- 2024: Closed
- 2025: Line reopened

Website
- Official website

The Train de Charlevoix is a tourist rail service between Quebec City (Chutes Montmorency) and La Malbaie, Quebec, with an additional stop in Baie-Saint-Paul and in the winter at the Le Massif ski area, a distance of about 140 kilometres (87 mi). It is owned and operated by Le Massif de Charlevoix, which also owns the Le Massif ski area.

The service ceased operations in December 2024. In Summer 2025, Groupe Voyages Québec, will act as the exclusive distributor of all Charlevoix train packages and from June 13 to November 2, the tour operator will offer a departure per day at 8 a.m. from the Parc de la Chute-Montmorency, near Quebec City.

== History ==
=== Grand Trunk & Canadian National Railways ===
As early as 1928, regular year-round passenger service operated once a day as far as La Malbaie (then referred to as Murray Bay). A seasonal second train per day service operated from June to September from Quebec City. By 1931, the service was extended to Montreal. At this time, only freight would continue to Clermont. By 1944, the extra train operated during summer months was dropped from the schedule, resulting in a once-daily schedule year round. In February 1971, Canadian National extended service to Clermont.

=== Via Rail ===
In 1977, Via Rail took over operation of most Canadian National and Canadian Pacific passenger services. By this time, Gare du Palais was closed for renovations, and Ste-Foy became the origin of all trains on the route, with a stop at Limoilou near the core of Quebec City. VIA Rail began operating the service daily with Budd Rail Diesel Cars. VIA Rail cancelled the train by the end of 1977.

=== Current tourist railway ===
Work on starting the train began in September 2008, when renovation of Charlevoix Railway trackage began, partially funded by grants from the federal and provincial governments, and with a total cost of C$18.4 million. In April 2010, work began on rebuilding eight railcars at a cost of close to $5 million; the cars were originally built in 1955 and 1956 by the St Louis Car Company and were previously used in commuter rail service in Chicago. Once refitted, the eight cars had a total capacity of 550 people, and along with two MLW RS-18 locomotives comprise the rolling stock used for the train. The refurbished rolling stock is now in storage, with the current rolling stock being two married pairs of DB Class 628.1, with a third added in 2018 for increased service. In early 2019, it was announced that the train would begin operating during the winter months in partnership with a new Club Med location opening at the ski hill.

== See also ==
- Charlevoix Railway
- Dinner train
- List of heritage railways in Canada
