= Le Massif =

Ski resort in Québec, Canada

Le Massif de Charlevoix

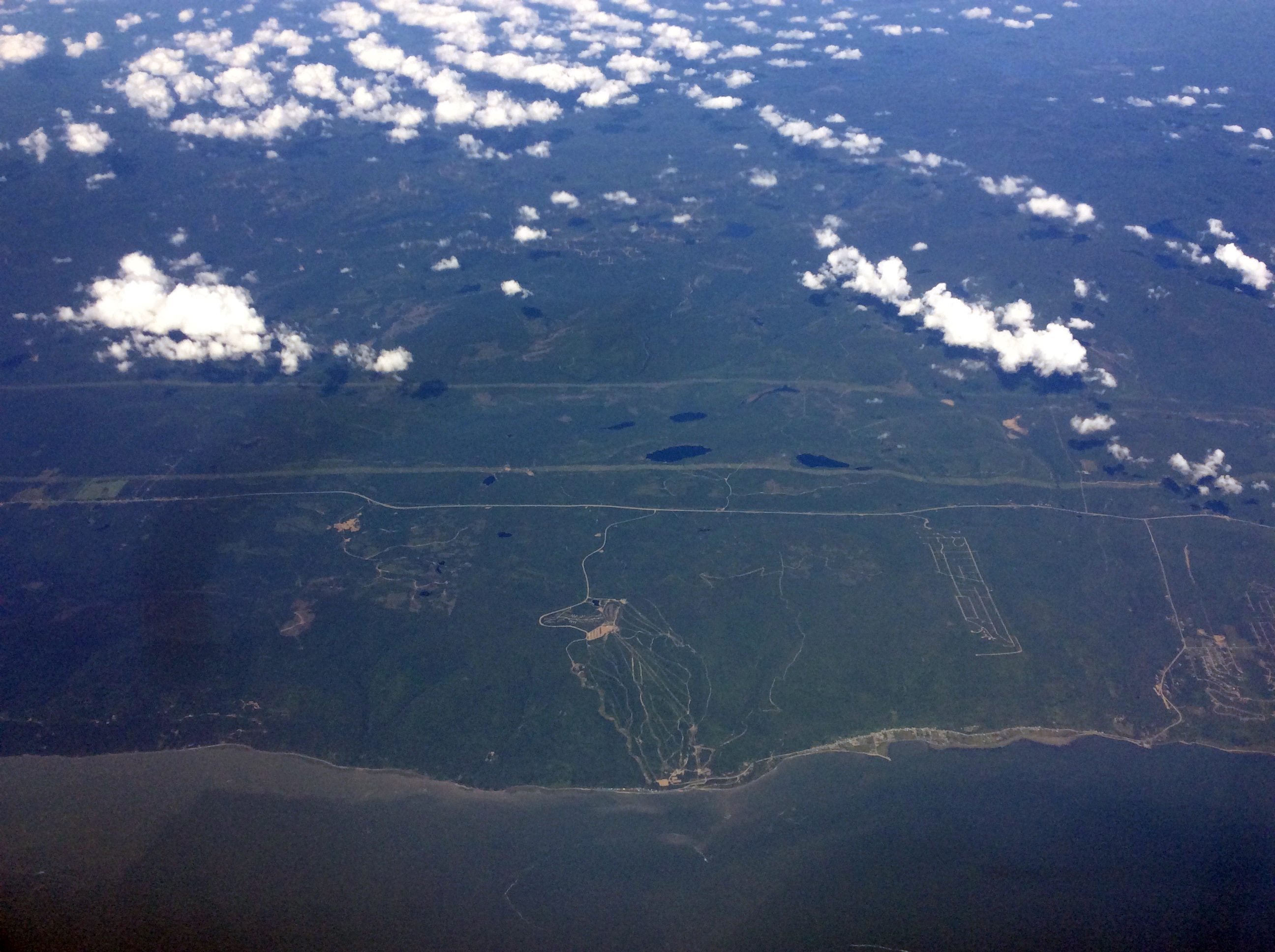
- Slopes overlooking the St. Lawrence River

- Location in Canada Location in Quebec
- Location: Petite-Rivière-Saint-François, Quebec, Canada
- Nearest city: Quebec City: 70 km (43 mi)
- Coordinates: 47.28°N 70.61°W
- Vertical: 770 m (2,526 ft)
- Top elevation: 806 m (2,644 ft)
- Base elevation: 36 m (118 ft)
- Skiable area: 406.3 acres (164.4 ha)
- Trails: 52 total: 15% Easy; 30% Intermediate; 20% Difficult; 35% Expert
- Longest run: 5.1 km (3.2 mi)
- Lift system: 6 total 1 high-speed gondola 3 detachable quads 1 platter-type 1 novice conveyor
- Lift capacity: 11,200 skiers/hr
- Terrain parks: 1
- Snowfall: 645 cm (250 in)
- Snowmaking: 70% - 174.6 acres (70 ha)
- Night skiing: No
- Website: lemassif.com

Le Massif de Charlevoix (French: [lə masif də ʃaʁləvwa], Quebec French: [lə masɪf də ʃaʁləvwɑ]), known as just Le Massif, is a ski area in Quebec, Canada, northeast of Quebec City and directly overlooking the St. Lawrence River.

== Description ==
The Le Massif de Charlevoix ski area is located in Petite-Rivière-Saint-François, Charlevoix, Quebec, 90 km northeast of Quebec City. Its vertical drop is 770 m (2,526 ft), the highest in Eastern Canada and east of the Canadian Rockies. It is one of the few ski areas that is accessible from both the base and summit.

Skiing season usually lasts from early December to late April. Le Massif de Charlevoix's has an above average annual snowfall compared to other ski areas in Eastern Canada with a five-year average of 645 cm (250 in). While the snowpack at the summit can exceed 240 cm (90 in) in a typical winter, the base is near sea level and can quickly begin to melt by April.

La Charlevoix, the steepest trail with a pitch of 64%, is home to the only alpine training center east of the Rockies for Canada's athletes.

The resort stretches from the top of the escarpment (actually a half-graben) to the bottom, where the Saint Lawrence River flows past.

Le Massif de Charlevoix is part of two multi-resorts ski pass networks: the Ikon Pass and Mountain Collective. It is also part of a mountain biking collective: the Loam Pass.

Le Massif also markets more than 100 accommodation units for available for rent, both at the summit and the base of the mountain.

== History ==
Skiing at Le Massif de Charlevoix started at the end of the 1970s, with snowmobiles towing groups of skiers from the main road at the top and a van serving as the lift. In the early 1980s, commercial operations started with la Société de développement du Massif. Starting in 1983–1984, school buses were used to drive skiers from the base to the top after each run. In the summer of 1992, two chairlifts were installed: a high-speed quad and a fixed-grip double.

The year of 2001 saw significant change for Le Massif de Charlevoix. A new road was built from Route 138 to the top of the mountain. The distance between Quebec City and Le Massif de Charlevoix summit was then reduced to 70 km (43 mi) instead of the 95 km (60 mi) previously needed to reach the base via the village of Petite-Rivière-Saint-François. At the same time, the Cap Maillard was raised by 35 m (115 ft) to create La Charlevoix, an International Ski Federation standard downhill trail mapped by alpine course designer (and champion) Bernhard Russi. It hosted the speed events of the 2006 Junior World Championships, with technical events at Mont-Sainte-Anne. However, La Charlevoix was deemed unsuitable for hosting an Olympic downhill men’s event, hurting Quebec City's chances at hosting a Winter Olympics. The Junior Worlds returned in 2013.

Daniel Gauthier, co-founder of Cirque du Soleil, bought Le Massif de Charlevoix in 2002. Gauthier is no longer a co-owner of Cirque du Soleil, and has used part of the proceeds of the sale of his participation in that venture to purchase Le Massif.

In 2005, Jean-Luc Brassard, the 1994 Olympic champion in freestyle mogul skiing, became a spokesman for Le Massif de Charlevoix.

In 2009, after a record snowfall of 915 cm (360 in), Le Massif de Charlevoix added 26 acres (11 ha) of backcountry skiing on Mount A Liguori.

From 2011 to 2024, a tourist train service from Quebec City stopped in the winter at Le Massif de Charlevoix.

The mountain is home to Canada's sole Club Med, which opened in 2021.

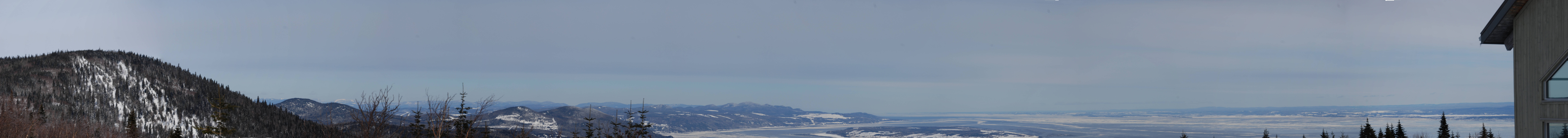
Large panorama taken from the top of Le Massif along the Saint-Lawrence River

== Development ==
Le Massif de Charlevoix is about to undertake a major development known as Territoire Le Massif. This will open up the third peak to skiing, but mostly transform the mountain and surrounding area into a four-seasons resort, while respecting environmental values.

The project has a budget of about C$180 million in new investments, in addition to the $50 million already spent, and comprises three parts:

- La Ferme (The Farm): Hotel, services and activities in Baie-Saint-Paul, on the site of a burned-out farm. Opening in June 2012, it was awarded first prize in the Hotel and Service Retail Category of the Retail and Leisure Interior awards in March 2013.
- La Base (The Base): Services, lodging and activities at the base of Le Massif de Charlevoix, west of the village of Petite-Rivière-Saint-François.
- Les Crêtes (The Ridges): Services, lodging and activities at the summit of Le Massif de Charlevoix.

== Climate ==
There is a weather station near the summit of Le Massif de Charlevoix, situated at an elevation of 723 m (2,372 ft). Charlevoix (MRC) has a humid continental climate (Köppen Dfb), closely bordering on a subarctic climate (Köppen Dfc).

Climate data for Charlevoix (MRC), Quebec, 1998–2020 normals, 1997–2023 extremes: 723 m (2,372 ft)
Month	Jan	Feb	Mar	Apr	May	Jun	Jul	Aug	Sep	Oct	Nov	Dec	Year
Record high °C (°F)	8 (47)	9 (48)	21 (70)	21 (69)	28 (83)	31 (87)	30 (86)	29 (84)	30 (86)	24 (76)	18 (64)	11 (51)	31 (87)
Mean maximum °C (°F)	2.5 (36.5)	2.3 (36.2)	7.2 (44.9)	14.8 (58.7)	23.8 (74.8)	26.2 (79.2)	26.4 (79.6)	25.6 (78.0)	23.7 (74.7)	17.6 (63.6)	10.7 (51.3)	5.1 (41.2)	27.7 (81.8)
Mean daily maximum °C (°F)	−9.1 (15.6)	−7.7 (18.2)	−2.8 (26.9)	3.8 (38.9)	12.4 (54.3)	17.7 (63.9)	20.3 (68.6)	19.5 (67.1)	15.4 (59.7)	7.2 (45.0)	0.3 (32.6)	−5.9 (21.3)	5.9 (42.7)
Daily mean °C (°F)	−14.3 (6.2)	−13.2 (8.2)	−8.3 (17.1)	−0.9 (30.3)	6.8 (44.2)	12.2 (53.9)	15.1 (59.1)	14.2 (57.5)	10.2 (50.4)	3.1 (37.6)	−3.4 (25.8)	−10.4 (13.3)	0.9 (33.6)
Mean daily minimum °C (°F)	−19.6 (−3.2)	−18.7 (−1.7)	−13.7 (7.4)	−5.7 (21.7)	1.2 (34.1)	6.6 (43.9)	9.8 (49.6)	8.9 (48.0)	5.0 (41.0)	−0.9 (30.3)	−7.2 (19.0)	−14.8 (5.4)	−4.1 (24.6)
Mean minimum °C (°F)	−30.9 (−23.7)	−30.4 (−22.8)	−26.7 (−16.0)	−14.7 (5.5)	−5.2 (22.7)	−0.3 (31.4)	3.9 (39.0)	2.2 (36.0)	−1.9 (28.6)	−8.1 (17.5)	−17.9 (−0.2)	−26.3 (−15.3)	−32.5 (−26.5)
Record low °C (°F)	−38 (−37)	−36 (−33)	−31 (−24)	−24 (−11)	−11 (13)	−3 (26)	2 (35)	−2 (29)	−6 (22)	−15 (5)	−24 (−12)	−32 (−26)	−38 (−37)
Average precipitation mm (inches)	99 (3.88)	103 (4.07)	115 (4.54)	169 (6.64)	105 (4.15)	151 (5.94)	131 (5.16)	133 (5.25)	124 (4.90)	165 (6.50)	132 (5.21)	131 (5.15)	1,558 (61.39)
Source: XMACIS2 (normals, extremes & precipitation)

== See also ==
- Charlevoix Railway
- Charlevoix tourist train
- Groupe Le Massif Inc.
- List of ski areas and resorts in Canada
- Mont-Sainte-Anne
- Stoneham Mountain Resort
