= Canyon Sainte-Anne =

Gorge in Quebec, Canada

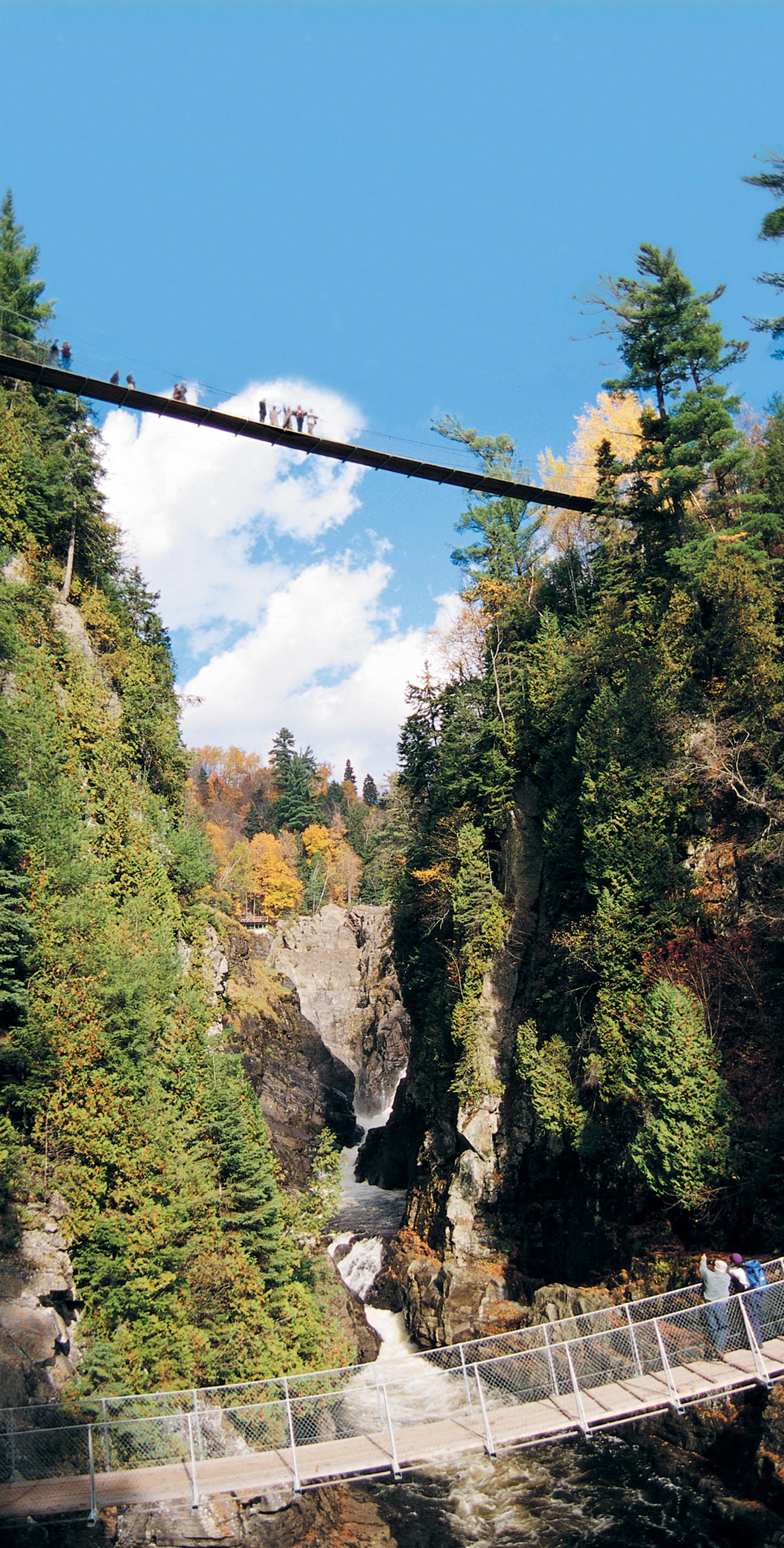
Two foot suspension bridges in Canyon Sainte-Anne

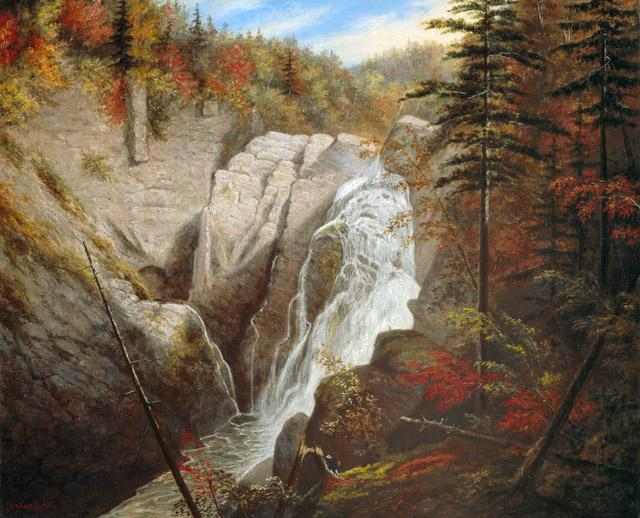
Chutes Sainte-Anne, by Cornelius Krieghoff, 1855

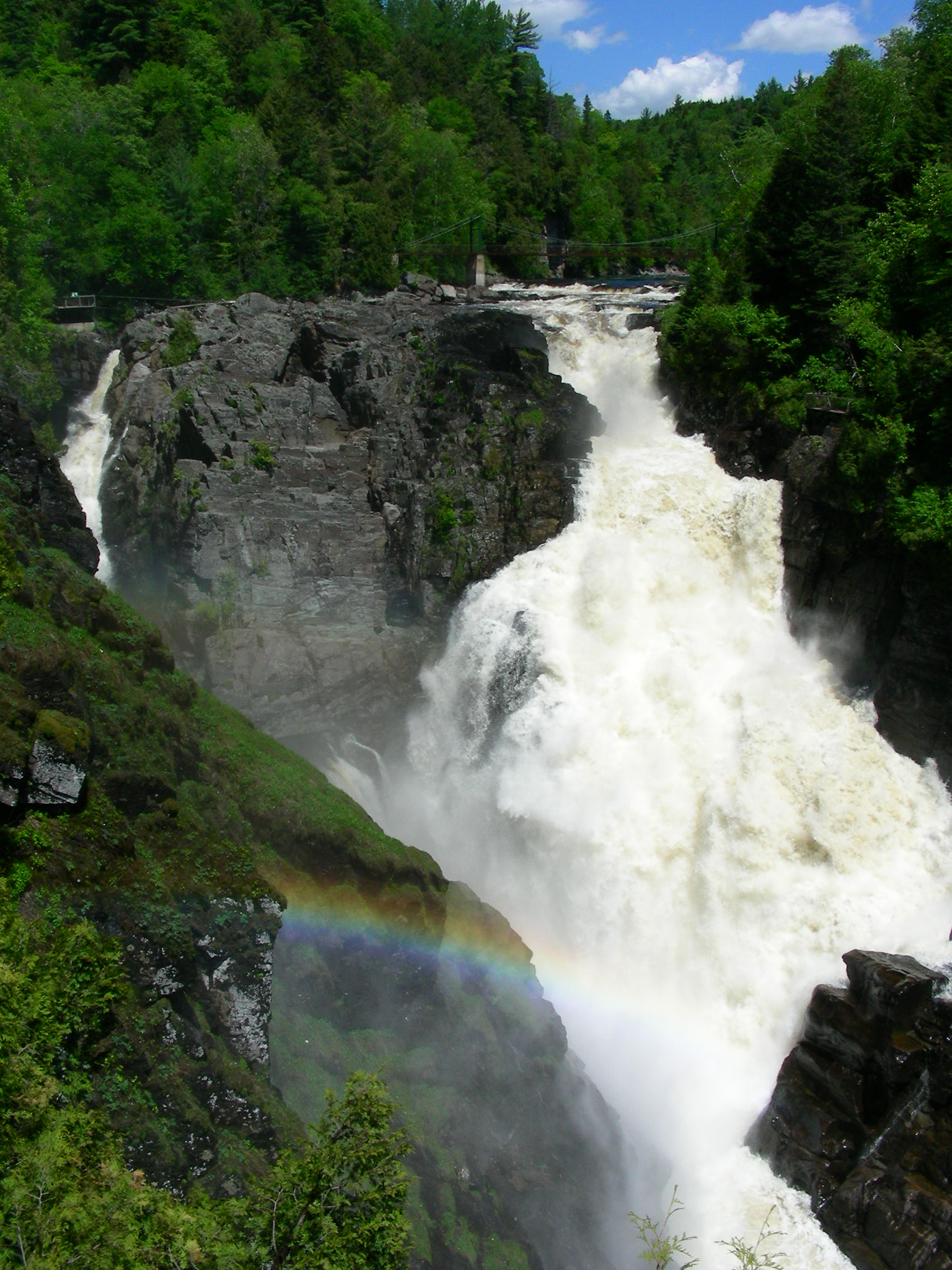
Sainte-Anne Falls in Canyon Sainte-Anne

Open from May to October, Canyon Sainte-Anne is a steep-sided gorge, carved by the Sainte-Anne-du-Nord River, 6 km east of Beaupré, Quebec, Canada. The river drops over a 74 m (243 ft) waterfall within the canyon.

== Site and Visitors ==
The Canyon receives over 100,000 visitors per year. Three suspension foot bridges cross the canyon, including one 60 m (197 ft) metres above the river. Many scenic overlooks allow families to discover giant potholes and other cascades. Rock-climbing, via ferrata (the first one installed in Canada), and rappelling the canyon walls are permitted with supervision.

Accessible to the public since 1973, the canyon was familiar to natives, painted by Kreighoff and described by American philosopher and environmentalist Henry David Thoreau. It was used during the filming of Battlefield Earth in 2000.

== Location ==
Canyon Sainte-Anne is located 25 to 30 minutes east of Quebec City, at the edge of the Beaupré Coast and Charlevoix regions. It lies on the border between the municipalities of Saint-Ferréol-les-Neiges and Saint-Joachim. The Sainte-Anne-de-Beaupré Basilica, the ski resort Mont Sainte-Anne, the Montmorency Falls and the Cap Tourmente National Wildlife Reserve are in the same area.

47°4′23.1″N 70°52′38.6″W

== Geology ==
The canyon is part of the Canadian Shield, a fundamental rock formation of northern parts of Manitoba, Ontario and Quebec, all around the Hudson Bay. It all started in the Precambrian Age (1,2 billion years ago) when hard rock formed the canyon's underlying rock. This metamorphic rock, called granitic gneiss, was formed at high pressure in the extremely hot depths of earth then rose to the surface through erosional uplift. It comprises much of Mont Ste-Anne. Later, some 450 million years ago, a sedimentary Palaeozoic sediment, a marine mud, was deposited in ancient seas on top of the gneiss, and consolidated into a rock called shale. The shale was metamorphosed into slate during the Acadian orogeny (a mountain building period 375 million years ago). Slate is a hard, resistant rock, able to withstand the erosive power of water.

Much later, two successive ice ages covered North America. The advance and recession of the last ice age helped sculpt the region into what we see now (the St. Lawrence Lowlands area with the St. Lawrence River, Île d'Orléans, and the Magdalene Islands, as well as all the rivers known today). The weight of the ice depressed the crust so that, when the ice retreated (melted), the Atlantic Ocean waters invaded to form the Champlain Sea (and deposit the most recent sediments of sand, gravel, and clay). The subsequent rebound of the crust and erosion produced the landscape we see today.

== History ==
Because of its advantageous route, the Sainte-Anne-du-Nord River was widely used by loggers at the start of the 20th century. During a camping trip to the area in the summer of 1965, a former logger explained to Jean-Marie McNicoll how to reach the Sainte-Anne River falls. As there was no road to the river, Jean-Marie had to make his way through the woods but was rewarded with the discovery. He returned to his brother Laurent telling him he had discovered a similar place.

Two years later, they leased the immediate shores of the river from Hydro-Québec and purchased the wooded lots between Route 138 and the leased riverbanks. Slowly but surely, work began to clear a road. All was in place to welcome the first visitors on July 14, 1973.

== Honours ==
- 2002: Canadian Winner 2002, "Attraction Canada Awards", category: "Natural Outdoor Site, less than 100 km^{2}".
- 2002: Quebec Tourism Awards, silver medallist, category: « Tourist attraction, 100 000 visitors and more ».
- 2001: Top 5, Elle Québec Magazine, listed as one of the five most interesting natural site, near of an urban agglomeration, July 2001.
- 2000: Henry David Thoreau: 150th anniversary of his passage, American philosopher and naturalist.
- 1999: Quebec Tourism Awards for the Great Quebec City area, category: « Responsible and durable tourism ».
- 1999: Shooting of exterior scenes of the movie "Battlefield earth" produced by John Travolta.
- 1988: Quebec Tourism Awards, for the Great Quebec City area, category: « Small touristic enterprise ".
- 1983: Canadian Winner, State minister for Small business and tourism, silver medallist, category « Exceptional contribution to touristic industry ».
- AAA/CAA Tourist guide: star Attraction in the Quebec City area. Canyon Sainte-Anne has joined a group of a dozen most impressive sites not to miss.

== In the same area ==
- Montmorency falls park
- Cap Tourmente National wildlife reserve
- Sainte-Anne-de-Beaupré Shrine and pilgrimage center
- Ski station and resort Mont Sainte-Anne

== See also ==
- List of waterfalls of Canada
- Sépaq
