= Saint Anne Falls =

Waterfall on the Ste-Anne-du-Nord River in Quebec, Canada

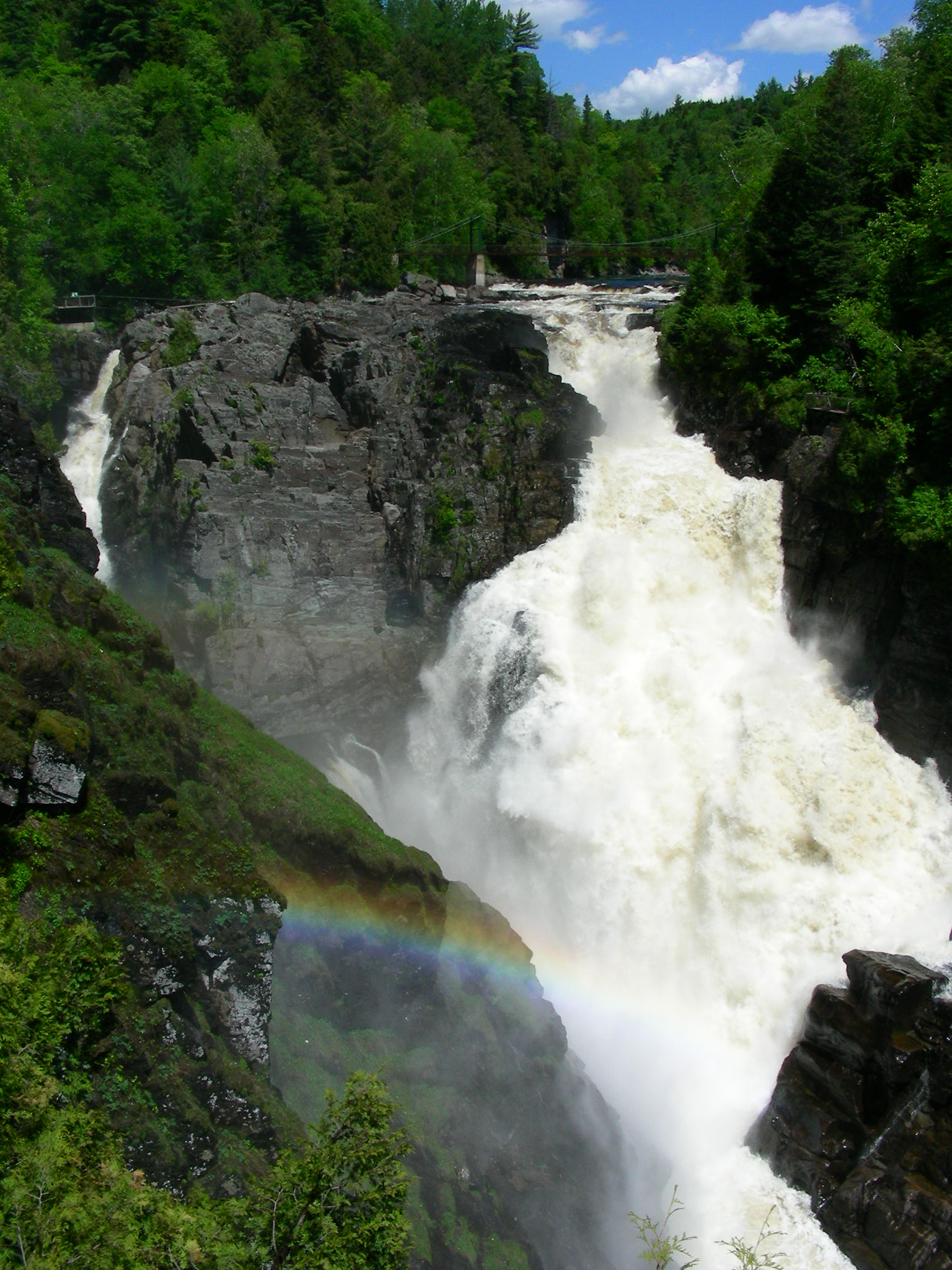
- Interactive map of Saint Anne Falls
- Location: Canyon Sainte-Anne, Saint-Ferréol-les-Neiges / Saint-Joachim, Quebec
- Coordinates: 47°04′23″N 70°52′39″W
- Type: Tiered
- Total height: 230 feet (70 m)
- Watercourse: Sainte-Anne-du-Nord River

Saint Anne Falls (French: Chute Sainte-Anne) is a waterfall going through Canyon Sainte-Anne, Quebec.

== See also ==
- List of waterfalls
- List of waterfalls of Canada
