= Montmorency Falls =

Waterfall on the Montmorency River in Québec, Canada

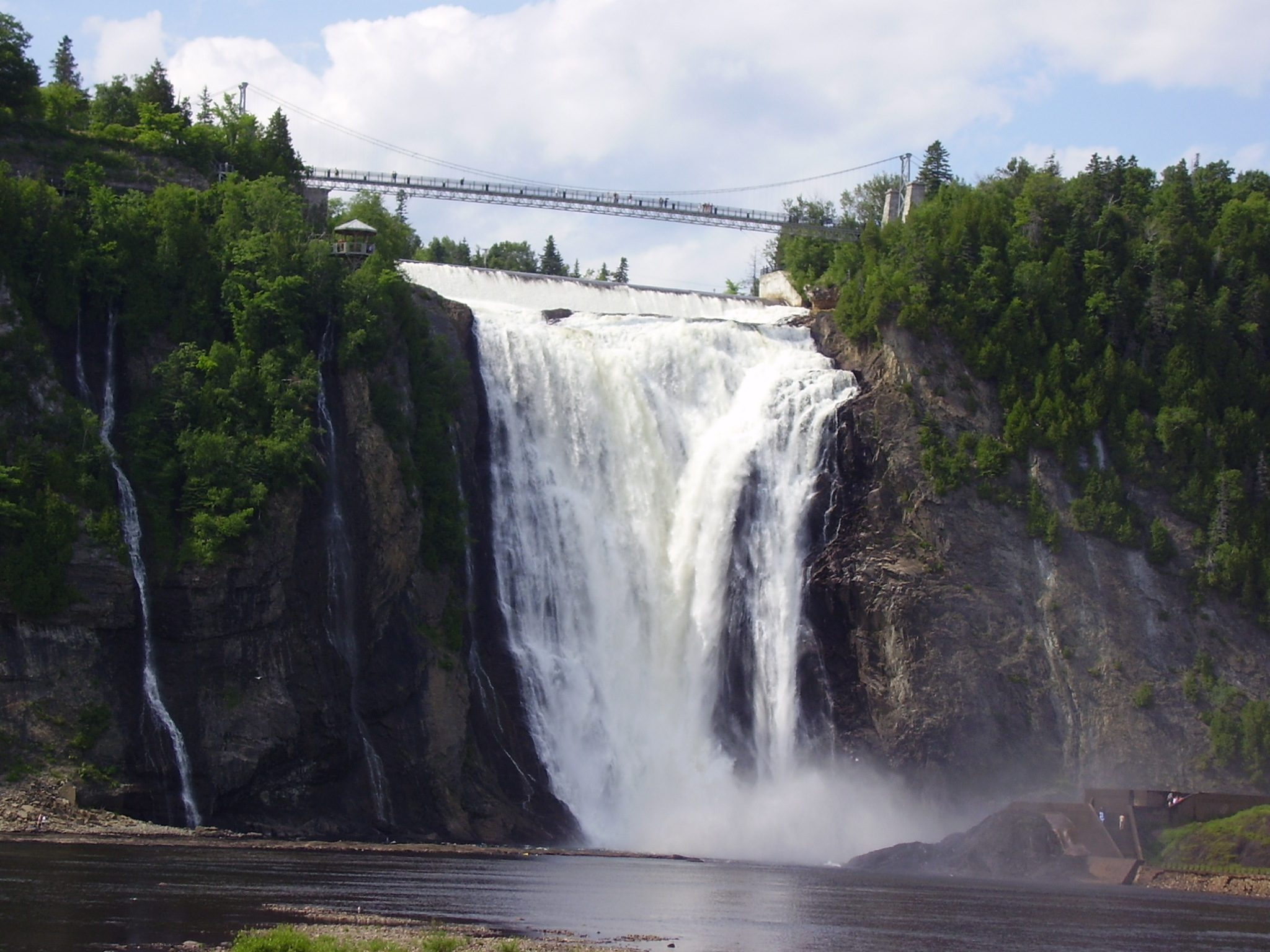
- Montmorency Falls in the summer.
- Interactive map of Montmorency Falls
- Location: Quebec City, Quebec, Canada
- Coordinates: 46°53′27″N 71°8′51″W
- Type: Cataract
- Total height: 83 m (272 ft)
- Number of drops: 2
- Watercourse: Montmorency River
- Average flow rate: 130 m^{3}/s (4,600 cu ft/s)

The Montmorency Falls (French: Chute Montmorency) is a large waterfall on the Montmorency River in Quebec, Canada.

== Location ==
The falls are located on the boundary between the borough of Beauport and Boischatel, about 12 km (7.5 mi) from the heart of old Quebec City. The area surrounding the falls is protected within the Montmorency Falls Park (French: Parc de la Chute-Montmorency). The falls are at the mouth of the Montmorency River where it drops over the cliff shore into the Saint Lawrence River, opposite the western end of the Île d'Orléans. The waterfalls are 83 m (272') tall, a full 30 m (99') higher than Niagara Falls.

== Access and tourism ==
Around 970,000 visitors a year visit Montmorency Falls. There are staircases that allow visitors to view the falls from several different perspectives. A suspension bridge over the crest of the falls provides access to both sides of the park. There is also a funitel that carries passengers between the base and the top of the falls. In the summer the park hosts an international fireworks competition with the falls as a backdrop.

During summer months, the falls give off a yellow glow due to high iron content in the waterbed.

The Ice Hotel was located at Montmorency Falls for its first year in 2001.

In July 2019, it was announced that the Montmorency Falls tourist site would be getting a $33-million makeover.

== In popular culture ==
The Falls were the site of a key scene between the lead actors in the 1947 film Whispering City, which was filmed on location.

In his poem "Sleep and Poetry" (1816), John Keats says that human life is "a poor Indian's sleep / While his boat hastens to the monstrous steep / Of Montmorency." Recreational sleighing on the frozen falls is recorded in Letitia Elizabeth Landon's poetical illustration, The Montmorency Waterfall and Cone, to an engraving of a painting by W. Purser, published in Fisher's Drawing Room Scrap Book, 1836.

The Falls appeared during the finale of The Amazing Race Canada 5 in 2017 and were the site of the episode's first task in which competitors scaled a cargo net suspended over the Falls.

== Gallery ==
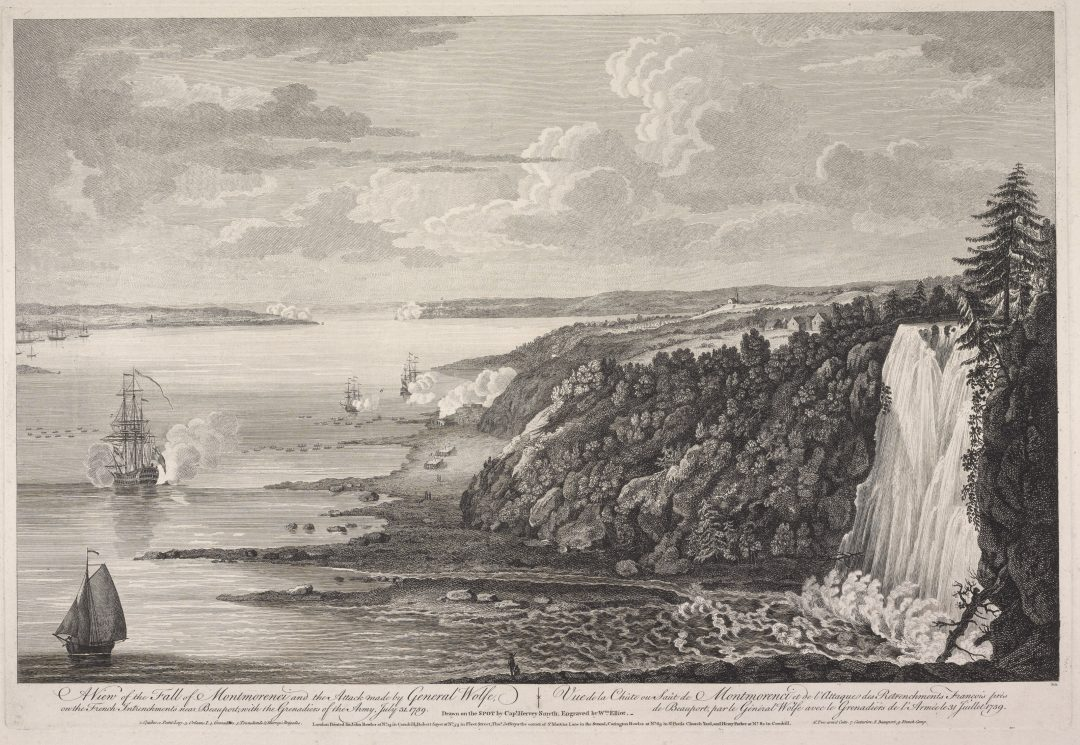
An early 1760s engraving of Montmorency Falls by William Elliott from a drawing made by Captain Hervey Smythe, Major General James Wolfe's aide-de-camp, on July 31, 1759, from the British Army's encampment, two months before the Battle of Quebec.

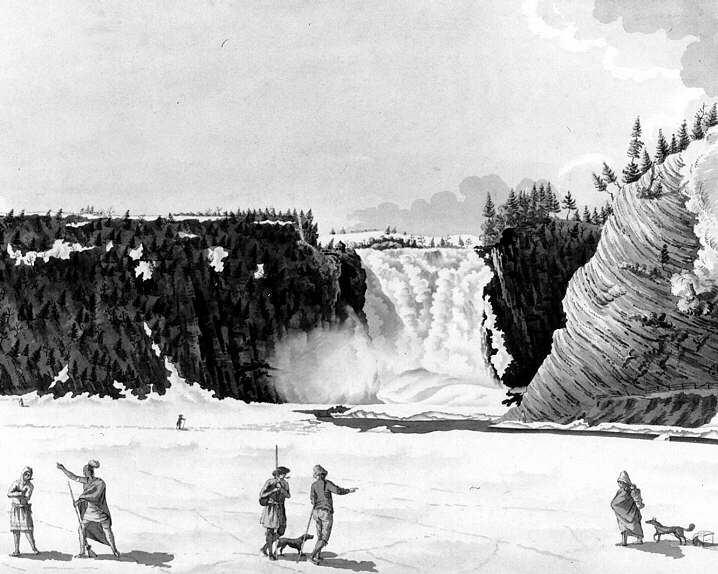
A 1781 etching of Montmorency Falls in May by the British surveyor James Peachey National Archives of Canada.

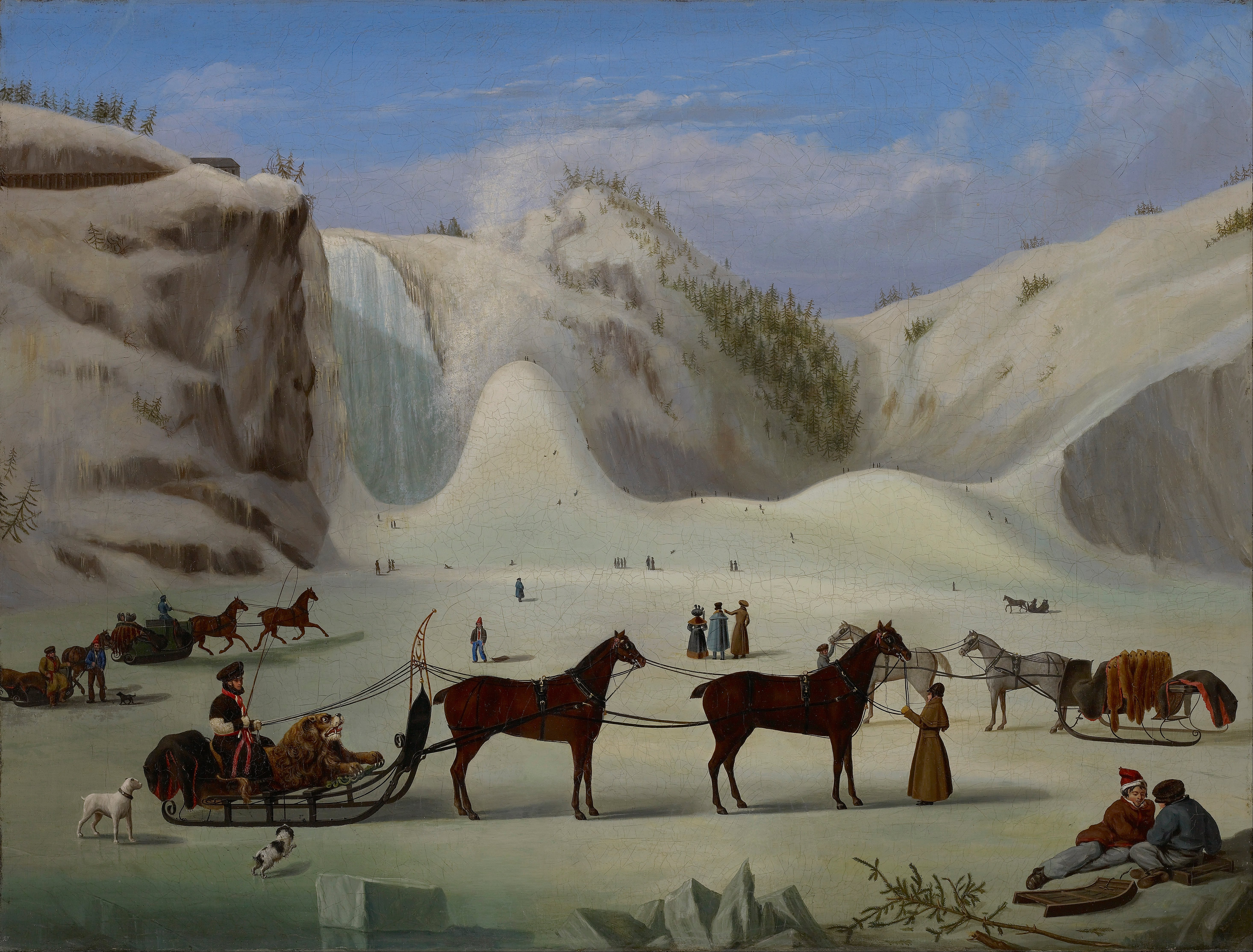
The Ice Cone, Montmorency Falls, Québec, an 1845 painting by the English artist Robert Clow Todd.

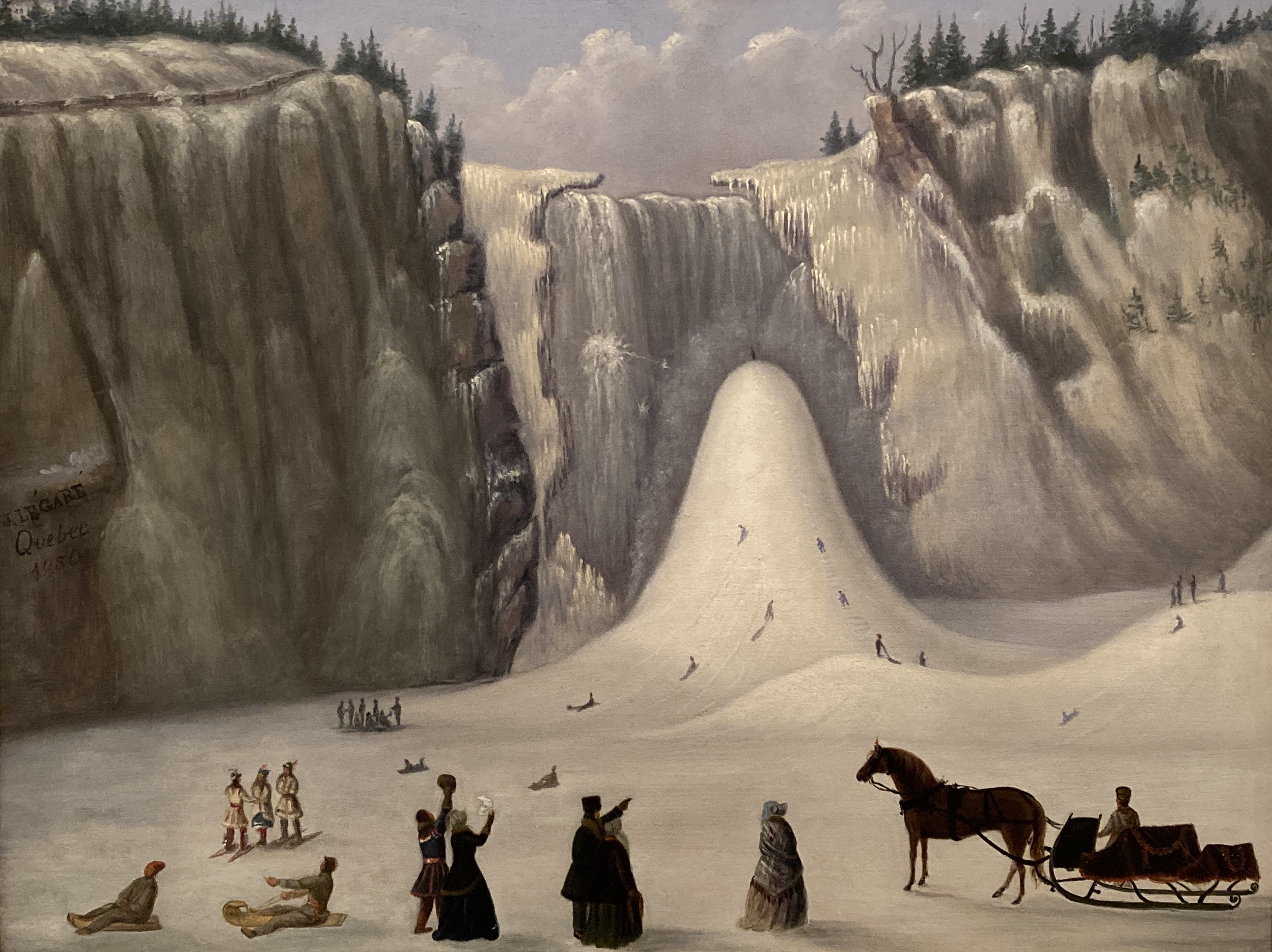
Montmorency Falls in Winter, an 1850 painting by the French-Canadian artist Joseph Légaré.

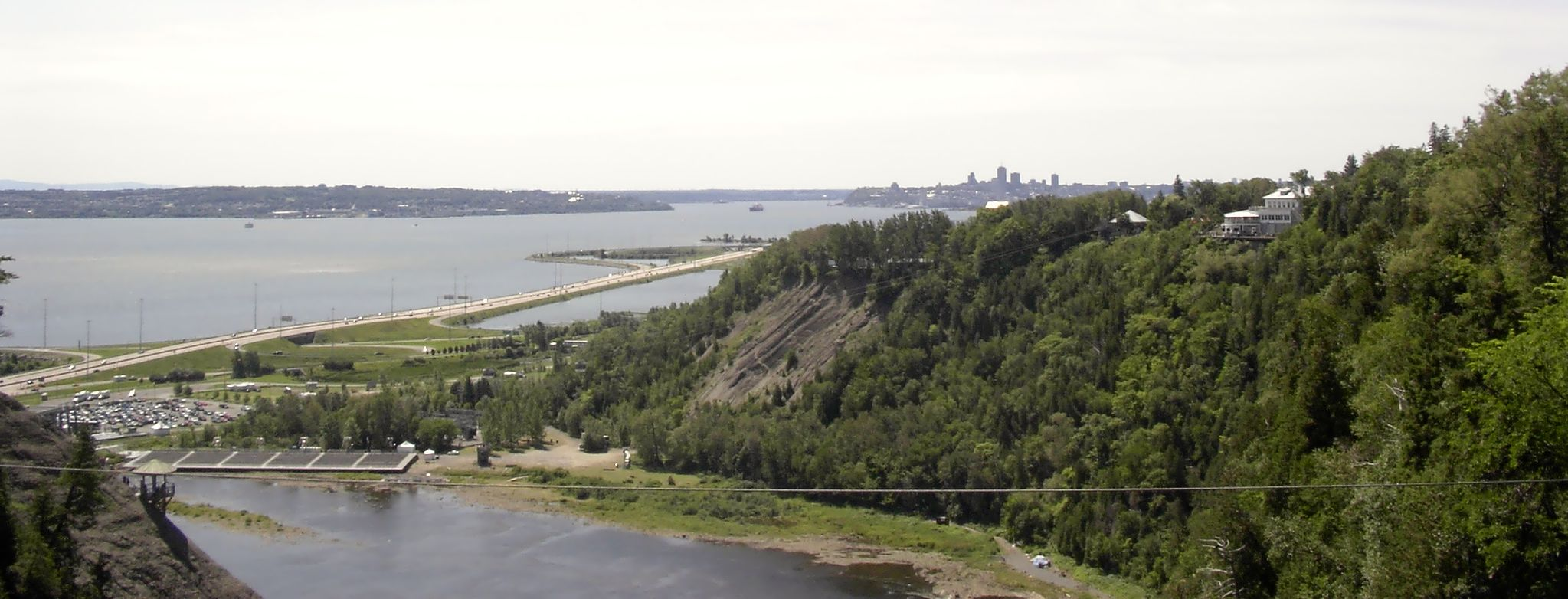
A look at the surrounding areas, opposite the falls. Quebec City can be viewed in the distance

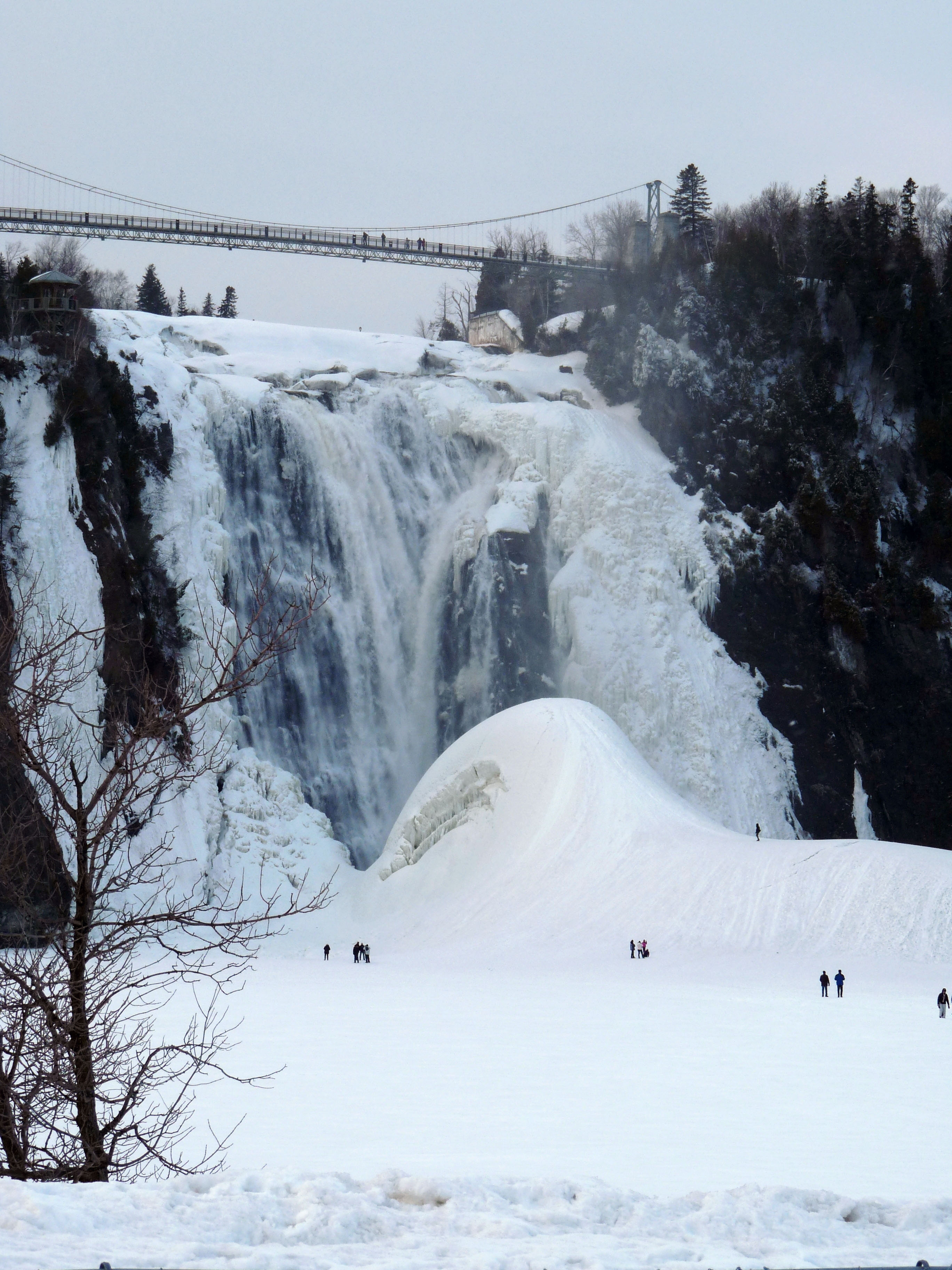
Photo of the Sugarloaf forming at the base of the falls in winter

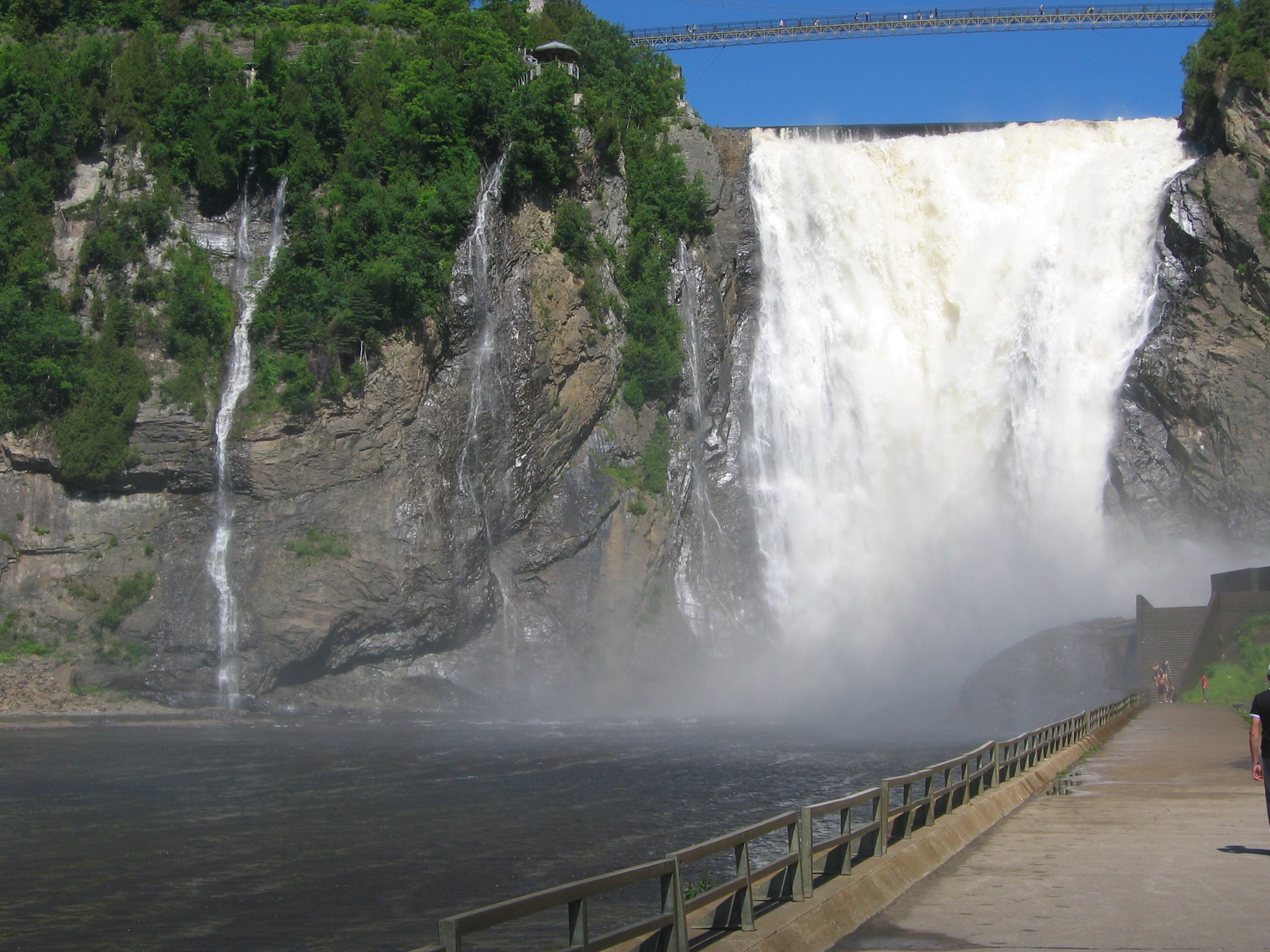
Falls

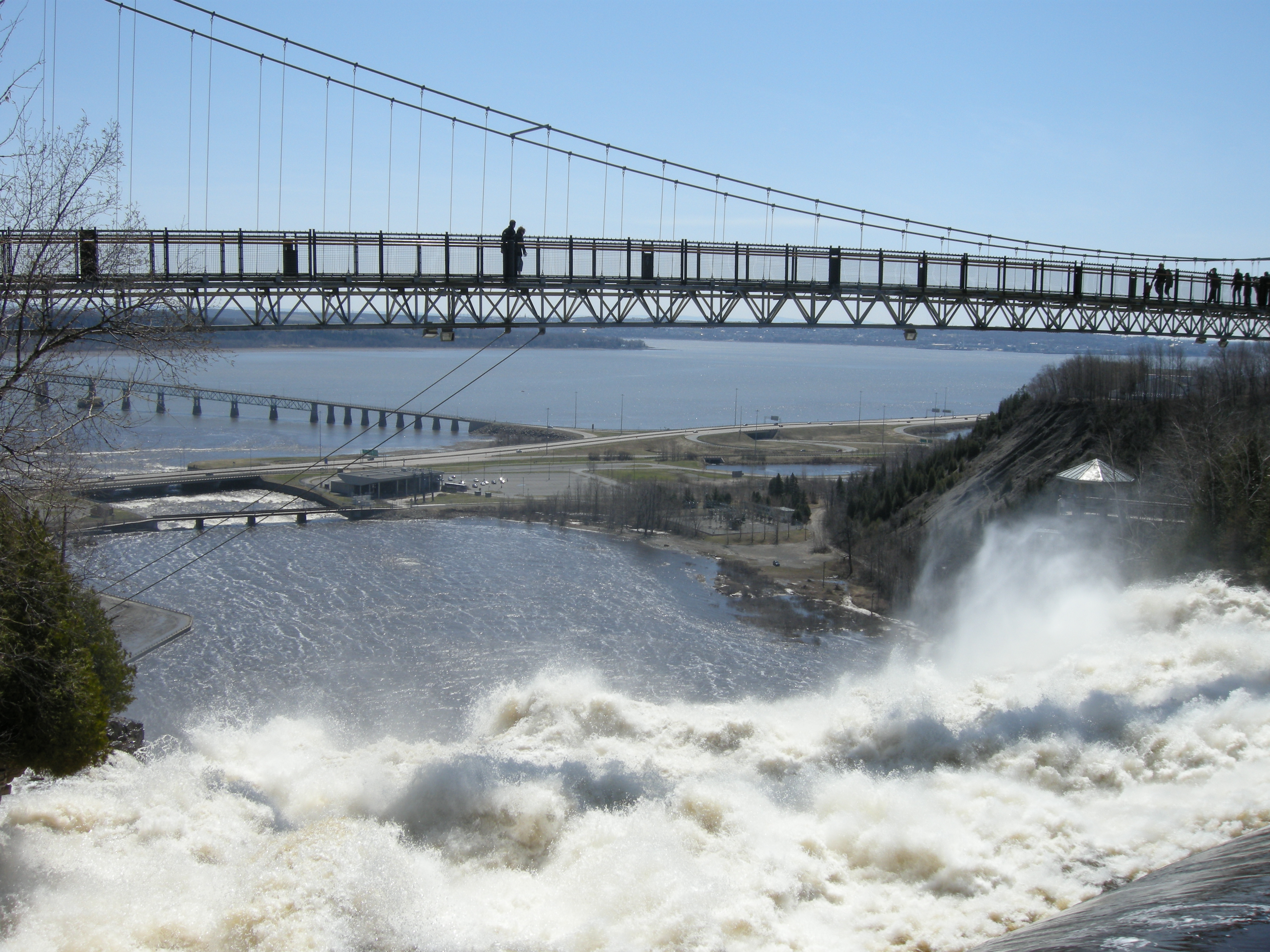
Suspension bridge

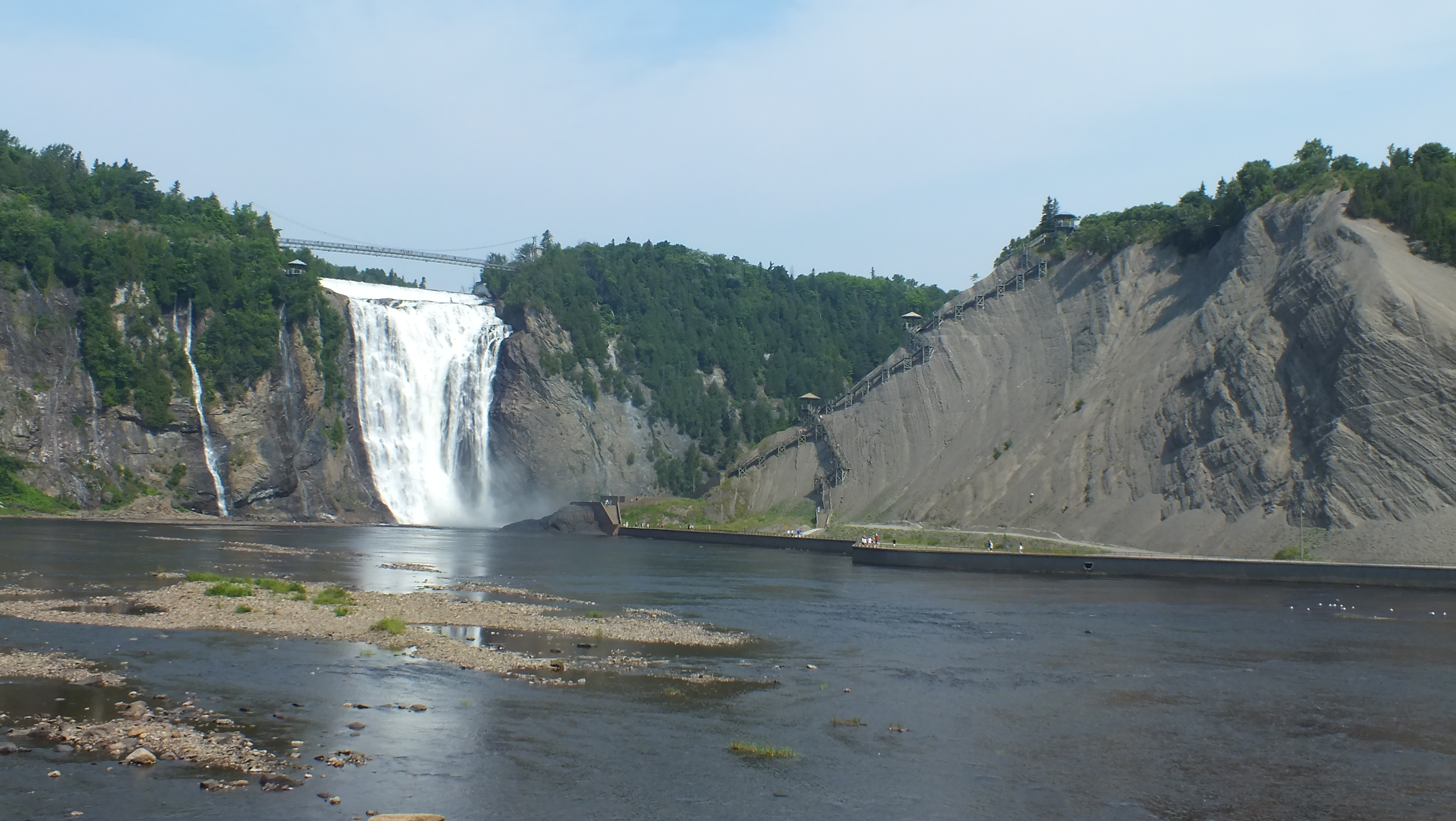
Distant view

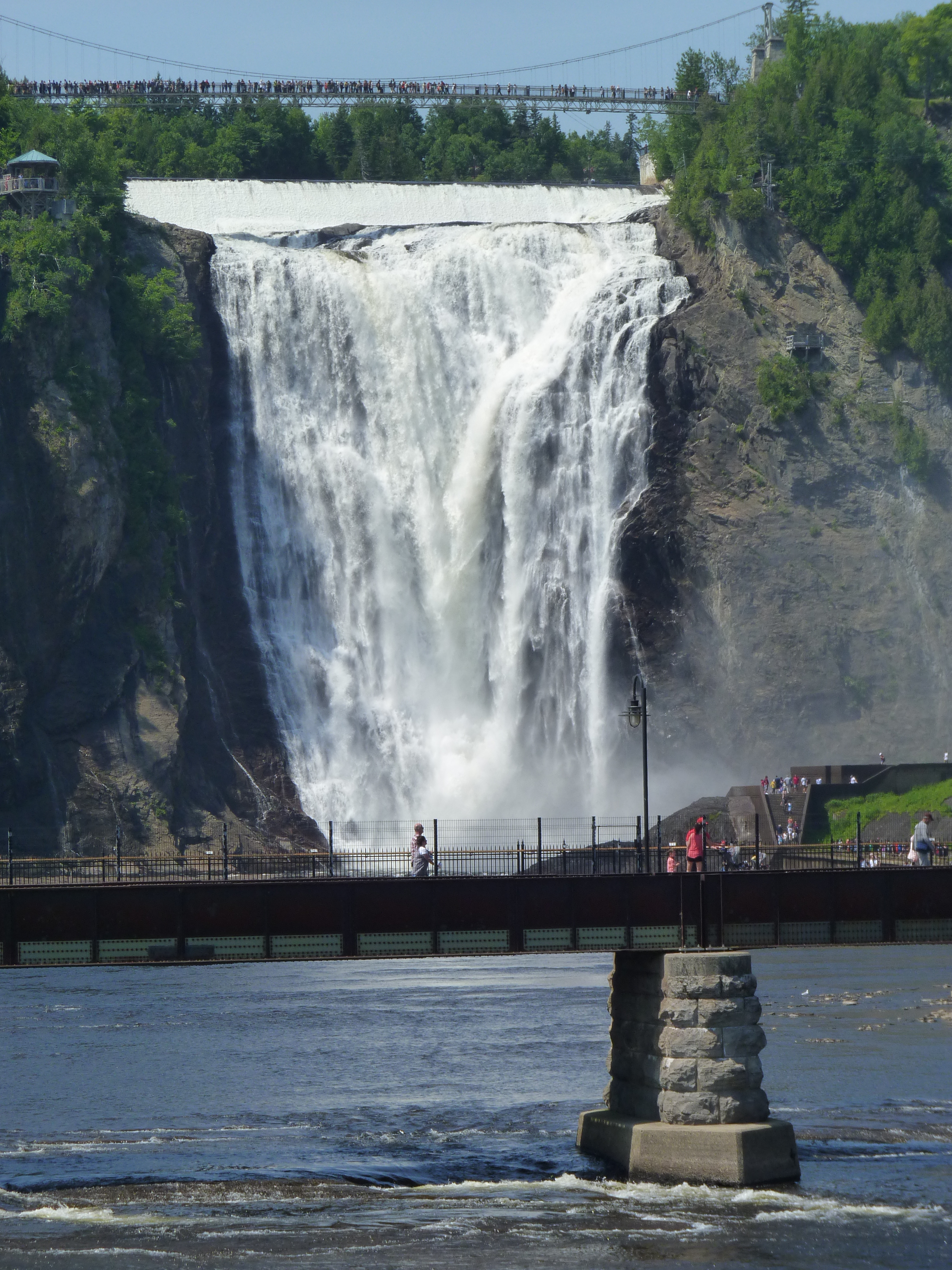
View of Montmorency Falls from the Trans Canada Trail

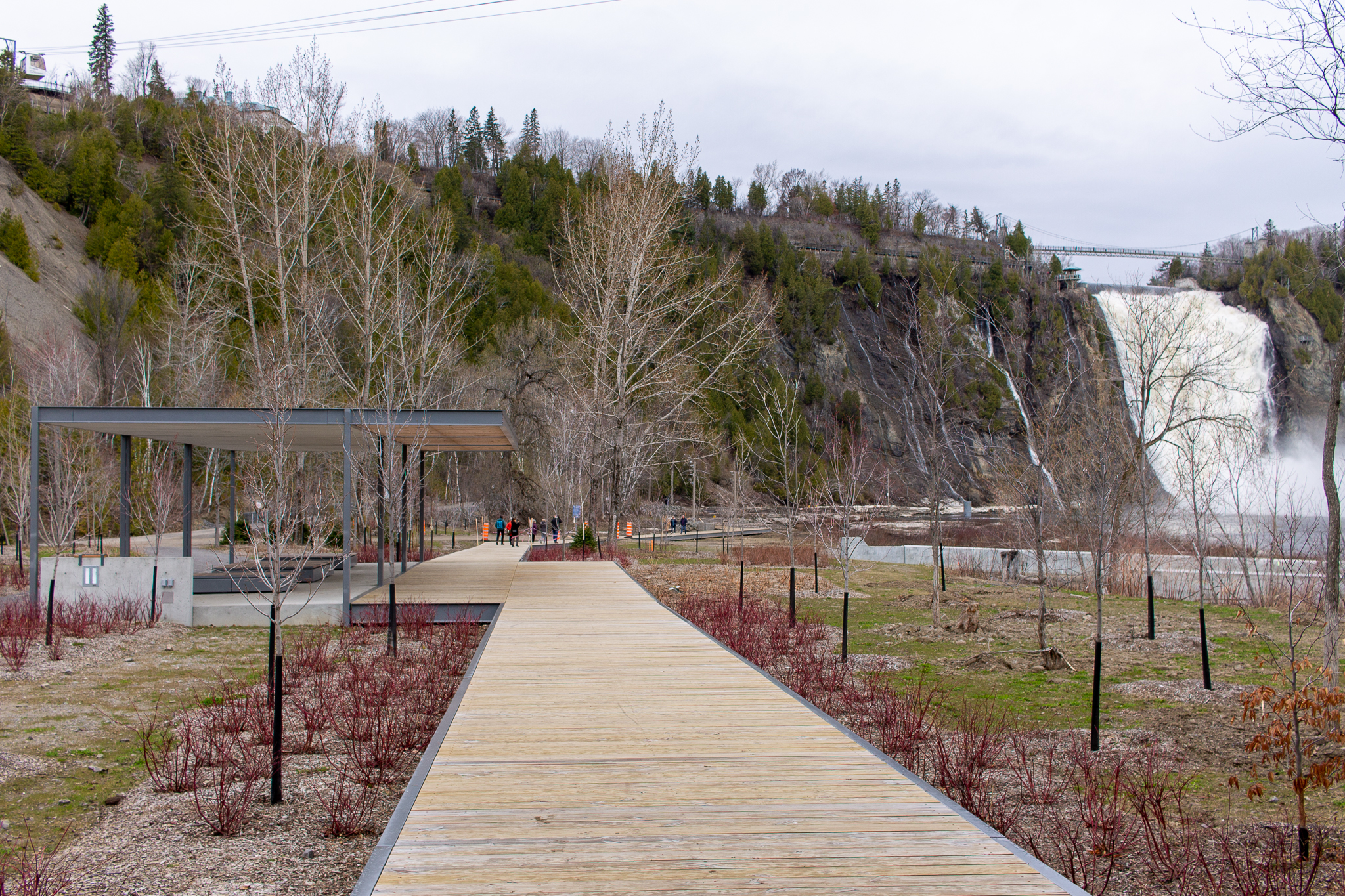
Wooden trail

== See also ==
- Canyon Sainte-Anne
- Charlevoix tourist train
- List of waterfalls
- List of waterfalls of Canada
- Sépaq
